= List of newspapers in Armenia =

This is the list of newspapers in Armenia.

== Daily newspapers ==
In Armenian:
Affiliated with ARF:

- Hraparak (Հրապարակ, "Square"), pro-Russian
- Yerkir (Երկիր, "[The] Country"), social democratic

Affiliated with RPA:

- 168 Zham (168 ժամ, 168 Hours)
- Iravunk (Իրավունք, "Right[s]")

Affiliated with Civil Contract:

- Haykakan Zhamanak (Հայկական Ժամանակ, "Armenian Times"), liberal

Affiliated with ADL:

- Azg (Ազգ, "The Nation"), national liberal, published since 1991

Other:

- Aravot (Առավոտ, "Morning"), published since 1994, liberal, independent
- Irates (Իրատես, "Realist")
- Past (Փաստ, Proof)
- Zhamanak (Ժամանակ, "Time")
- Zhoghovurd (Ժողովուրդ, "People")

Defunct:

- Hayots Ashkharh (Հայոց Աշխարհ, "Armenian World"), previously pro-government, published in 1997-2018
- Hayastani Hanrapetutyun (Հայաստանի Հանրապետություն, "The Armenian Republic"), government gazette, published in 1990-2023

In Russian:

- Golos Armenii (in Russian Голос Армении, "Voice of Armenia") published in Russian since 1934
- Novoe Vremya (in Russian Новое время) published in Russian

== Weekly newspapers ==
- Irates (twice per week)

== Monthly newspapers ==
Multilingual:

- Magen David, published by the Jewish Community of Armenia

== Online news agencies ==
Affiliated with ARF:

- 301.am
- Zartonk Media
- The Armenian Report

Affiliated with RPA:

- Tert.am
- Tribune.am
- Antifake.am

Affiliated with Civil Contract:

- Civic.am

Other:

- 1in.am
- A1 Plus
- Armenia
- Armenia Diaspora
- Armenia Hello
- ArmeniaNow
- Armenpress
- Aysor
- De Facto
- EIN News
- Eurasia Net
- Fmgnews.info
- Gamk
- Groong
- Hetq Online
- Hye Media
- Index Mundi
- Lragir
- Media
- News.am
- News Now
- Oratert
- PanARMENIAN.Net
- Panorama
- Topix

== See also ==
- Armenian newspapers for newspapers related to Armenia published outside Armenia
- Media of Armenia
