= Television in Armenia =

Television in Armenia was introduced in 1955, when Armenia was still known as the Armenian SSR.

== List of channels ==
This is a list of television channels that broadcast from Armenia in Armenian.

=== Public ===
Name	Owner	Established
Armenia 1	Public Television of Armenia	1954

=== Private ===
Name	Owner	Established
Armenia TV	Pan-Armenian Media Group	1999
Shant TV	Shant TVR	1994
H2	Prometevs	1999
Yerkir Media	Husaber	2004
ATV	Pan-Armenian Media Group	2009
FastSports	Fast Media	2021
FastSports 1	Fast Media	2021
FastSports 2	Fast Media	2021
Armenian Business News	Armenian Business News	2022
Azatutyun TV	Radio Free Europe/Radio Liberty	2016
Freenews	Freenews	2020
First Channel News	Public Television of Armenia	2020
SONGTV Armenia	ODAK Group	2007

== Regional ==
Name	Established	Region
Dar 21 / 21 TV	1998	Yerevan
Kentron	2003	Yerevan
5TV	2015	Yerevan
New Armenia TV	2019	Yerevan
Nur TV	2021	Yerevan
Bun TV	2013	Yerevan
Artsakh Public TV	1988	Stepanakert
Gala TV	2005	Gyumri
Shant Gyumri	1994	Gyumri
Tsayg	1991	Gyumri
Delta TV	2019	Gyumri
Shirak Public TV	1992	Gyumri
Fortuna TV	1993	Vanadzor
Lori TVR	1995	Vanadzor
Channel 9	2002	Vanadzor
Mig TV	2004	Vanadzor
Ararat	2022	Ararat
Ankyun+3	1999	Alaverdi
Geghama TV	2010	Sevan
STV1	1999	Sevan
Qyavar	1997	Gavar
Zangak	1996	Martuni
Tavush TV	2010	Noyemberyan
Qamut	1994	Noyemberyan
Telelex	1999	Artashat
ALT	1989	Armavir
Noy	1995	Armavir
Khustup TV	2004	Kapan
Zangezur TV	2018	Kapan
Syuniq TV	2003	Sisian
Kaputjigh	1996	Kajaran
Last TV	1998	Goris
Nig	1997	Aparan
Hrazdan TV	1991	Hrazdan
Lusalik	1999	Charentsavan
Kotayk TV	1997	Abovyan

== Discontinued ==
Name	Owner	Established	Closed
A1plus	Meltex	1991	2002
Armnews	Qaryak Media	2001	2022
ALM	ALM Holding	2002	2011
Nork	AMPTV	1973	1999
Nor Alik	AMPTV	2002	2008
Ararat	AMPTV	2008	2011
ART 13	Art 13	1995	2004
AR	Grand Holding	1996	2021
Hayreniq TV	Grand Holding	2001	2011
Hay TV	Hay TV	1999	2011
TV5	CS Media	2002	2011
Noyyan Tapan	Noyyan Tapan	1996	2001
Armenakob	Armenakob	2000	2009
Avetis	Avetis TV	1995	2007
Cinemax	Cinemax Armenia	2000	2004
Ejmiatzin TV	Ejmiatzin	1994	2000
Mayr Hayrenik	Mayr Hayrenik	1994	2001
Ayg	Ayg	1996	1999
M-TV 3+2	3+2	1996	1998
Business TV	Armenia TV	1995	1999
Biayni	Biayni	1996	2000
Lime	Mher Vardanyan	2011	2015
Yerevan TV	Varsham Garibyan	1999	2014
H3	Orinats Yerkir	2014	2019
Sosi TV	Sosi TV	1996	2018
Artsakh Public TV	Government of Artsakh	1988	2024
Shoghakat TV	Armenian Apostolic Church	1998	2026

== Internet TV ==
Logo	Name	Owner
	Armenia 1	Public Television Company of Armenia
	USArmenia TV	CS Media
	Toot TV	Anush Media Group
	ARTN	Shant TVR
	A21TV / Cultural Channel	Arthur Hakobyan
	SONGTV Armenia	ODAK Group
	A1plus	A1plus
	Yerkir Media	Armenian Revolutionary Federation
	Gala TV	Gala TV
	ARM Music TV	ARM Music TV
	CivilNet TV	Civilitas Foundation

== Most viewed channels ==
Position	Channel	Share of total viewing (%)
1	Armenia TV	66
2	Shant TV	50
3	Armenia 1	45
4	Kentron	12
5	ATV	11
6	5TV	9
7	First Channel News	6
8	H2	5
9	New Armenia TV	4

== See also ==
- Armenian soap operas
- List of programs broadcast by Armenia TV and Armenia Premium
- List of programs broadcast by Public Television Company of Armenia
- Media of Armenia
