= Armen Margaryan =

Armenian actor (born 1971)

Armen Margaryan Honored Artist of Armenia
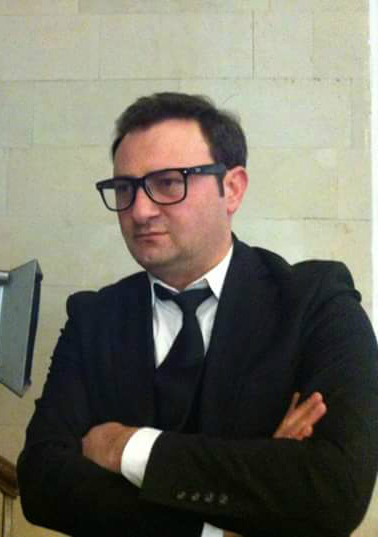
- Born: December 11, 1971 (age 53); Yerevan, Armenian SSR, Soviet Union
- Citizenship: Armenia
- Occupation: actor
- Years active: 1992–present

Armen Harutyuni Margaryan (Armenian: Արմեն Հարությունի Մարգարյան; born 11 December 1971, in Yerevan, Armenia) is an Armenian actor. He is an Honored Artist of Armenia since 2017.

== Early life ==
He was born on December 11, 1971, in Yerevan, Armenia. From 1979-1989 he studied at N 158 secondary school. In 1981 he studied at the theater-studio of Yerevan Children's Aesthetics Center (small theater). He was already playing and filming at the cinema, television and radio at a young age. From 1989 to 1993 he attended and graduated from Yerevan State Institute of Theater and Cinematography acting as a dramatic theater and film actor in the classroom of the USSR National Actor Kh. Abramyan.

== Career ==
=== Theater ===
In 1992 he received an invitation from Abrahamyan and went to work at the National Academic Theater after G. Sundukyan as an actor. From the first days of entering the theater, Armen Margaryan was quickly included in the playlist, appearing in the main artistic composition of the theater.

He performed in more than 30 plays in the theater.

- " Bourgeois nobleman" - Cliont
- " Cannibal’s daughter and Mysterious Master" - Master
- "My house is not your house" - Artyush
- " More expensive than Gold and Pearl " - The King of the Spirits
- "How difficult is it to die" - Azrail
- " The Prince and the poor" - Prince
- "Caligula" - manager
- "Love is under the hinges" - violinist
- "Ruzan" - Nerses
- "For Honor" - Suren
- "I am an apricot tree" - teacher, instructor
- "Stand up, the court is coming” - Gordon
- "The old lady's visit" - Priest
- "Our part of joy" - Vagharsh
- "The children of the Great Forest" - Dickon
- "Needless, unnecessary man" - Babken
- "Tram wish"
- " The neurosis of our parents" - Sheff
- "Old Gods" Moses monastic
- "Another victim" - Vano
- "Crime and Punishment" - Razumikh
- "Macbeth" - Banko
- "Caucasus Chalk Period " - fertilizer
- "Happy End" - William
- "40 Days of Musa Dagh Mountain" - Aram
- "John King" Pandolf
- "Richard the Third" - Gestin
- "Big Beggars" - Garbis (Editor) and more ....

He has made appearances in the concerts and festivals in the United States, England, and Lithuania, Russia, Belarus, Georgia and elsewhere receiving a high appreciation of critics and spectators. He played the role of "Ara Beautiful and Shamiram" Asur-Gabou (2009), "Do not Leave Me" Arthur (2012).

Since 2005 he has been a member of the Union of Theater Figures of Armenia.

=== Film and television ===
He has played more than 30 roles in film and television.

- "Squash"
- "Expert animals"
- "Great History in a Small Town"
- "Nothing Will Stay"
- "Killed dove"
- "The Crossfire Records" "Dialogues" "Garegin Nzhdeh"
- "Three friends"
- "Poker Am."
- "The owner-less"
- "Three lives"
- The "breath"
- "Trap"
- "Earthquake"
- "Life and fight 25 Years Later"
- "The Path of the Strangers"
- "Old Kings"
- "Change"
- "Father and Son"
- "Corruption"
- "Pomegranate seeds".

Since 2012 he has been working on "Armenian Public Television" (2007) and "Shoghakat" TV companies, he duplicated many roles, authored and hosted several TV shows, "Last visitor" ATV, "20th Century" Armenia TV.

He has been working in the Armenian Second TV Company since 2015. He is considered the "Eternity Voice" of the TV Company.

== Awards ==
- For the role of Suren in 2007 in the play ‘’For honor", he received the "Artist" theatrical prize from the R. A. Ministry of Culture.
- In 2012, he received the "Artavazd" award in the nomination of "The Best Male Actor of the Year".
- In 2015 For the contribution to the development of theater arts, creation and dissemination of artistic values, he was awarded with commemorative medal by Yerevan Municipality as "Honorary Figure of Culture of Yerevan".
- 2016 For honest work in the field of theater art, he was awarded the "Honor" of the Ministry of Culture of the RA.
- 2017 For his merits in theatrical arts he was awarded the Honorary title of Honored Artist of Armenia by the President of Armenia.
