= .հայ =

Internet internationalized country-code top level domain for Armenia

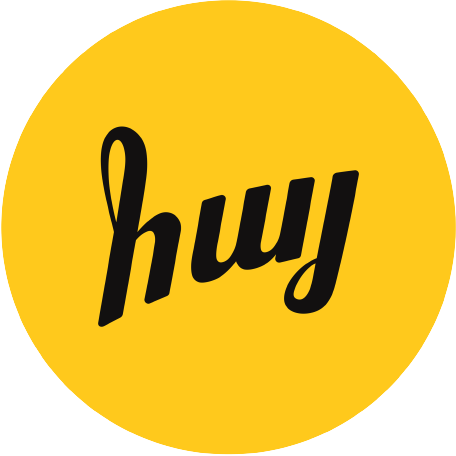
- Introduced: 2014
- TLD type: Country code top-level domain
- Status: Active
- Registry: AMNIC
- Sponsor: Internet Society of Armenia
- Intended use: Entities connected with Armenia, domain names preferably using the Armenian alphabet
- Actual use: Several thousand domains

.հայ (Armenian: Հայ, translit. hay, hye) is an internet country code top-level domain (ccTLD) for Armenia, designated for two-letter country code AM, intended for domain names in the Armenian language.

== Information ==
The Internet Corporation for Assigned Names and Numbers (ICANN) made a decision on 20 November 2014 to register the .հայ domain name. Support for .հայ Armenian language domain names is intended to promote the use of the Armenian keyboard globally, drive support for Armenian fonts on modern mobile devices, and generally promote use of the Armenian language online.

A report published by the Internet Assigned Numbers Authority (IANA) which works with the US government and ICANN stated that, "as the current operator of .AM ccTLD, the application has provided satisfactory details on the technical and operational infrastructure and expertise that will be used to operate the .հայ domain."

The domain's punycode encoding is .xn--y9a3aq.

== See also ==
- Internet in Armenia
- Mass media in Armenia
