= Hrachya Keshishyan =

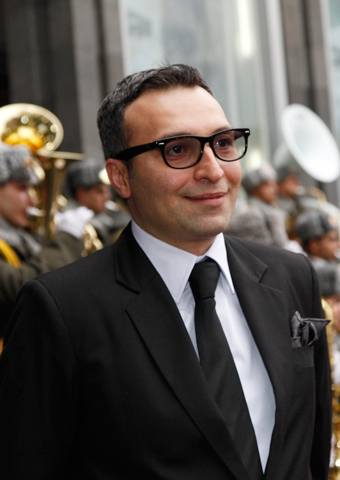
- Born: 15 August 1970 (age 55); Yerevan, Armenian SSR, Soviet Union
- Occupation(s): Film director, screenwriter, producer
- Years active: 1990–present

Hrachya Keshishyan (Armenian: Հրաչյա Քեշիշյան; born 15 August 1970) is an Armenian film director and producer, winner of numerous international awards.

== Biography ==
Keshishyan was born on 15 August 1970 in Yerevan, the capital of Armenia.

From 1990–1993 he worked as a director for Armenian State TV and Radio Committee.

From 1993–1998 he was the head of TV Programs Unit of Information and Propaganda Department at Ministry of Defence.

From 1996–2000 he was the Art 13 TV general producer, then in 1999–2010 general producer of Armenia 1 and Nor Alik.

From 1999–2011 Keshishyan produced and directed many TV programs and shows at Armenian Public TV and Nor Alik, such as "Late Night", "Rubicon", "The First Wave Cafe", "The First Program", "National Music Channel", "News on National Music Channel", "Musical Post", "Fashion", "Open project", "Foreign games", "Mechanics of Happiness", "Resolution", "Europolis", "Top 10", "Hot 10", "Two Stars", "Benefis", "Saturday Evering", and "Song of Songs".

In 1999 he was the general producer of Armenian National TV.

In 2001 he was the general producer of Armenian Public TV.

From 2003–2011 he produced Armenian National Music Awards and from 2006–2008 was the producer for the contestants from Armenia at the Eurovision Song Contest.

In 2004 he was the head of the general producer of Nor Alik.

In 2011 he was the head of the ATV Television Company.

In 2010 he was the chief advisor to the President of Public Council of TV and Radio of Armenia.

In 2012 he was the CEO and general producer of Armenia TV.

In 2015 he was the CEO and general producer of Armnews TV.

== Film director ==
Film	Year
The Mechanics of Happiness	2021
The Deer Season	2017
The project Golden Eye	2014
The House of the Heart	2014
Thank You, Dad	2013
Garegin Nzhdeh	2013
The Cross Thief's Memoir	2010
Three Friends	2009
The Killed Pigeon	2009
Taxi Eli Lava	2009
Nothing Will Stay	2007
Do not be sad (musical short film)	1998
The Sketches (documentary film – 10 episodes)	1996
INSURGENTS (documentary film)	1995
All Rivers Flow (documentary film)	1994

== Producer ==
Film	Year
The project Golden Eye	2014
The House of the Heart	2014
Garegin Nzhdeh	2013
The Cross Thief's Memoir	2010
Three Friends	2009
The Killed Pigeon	2009
Nothing Will Stay	2007
Don't Be Afraid	2006

== Screenwriter ==
- Nothing Will Stay (2007)

== Awards ==
Hrachya Keshishian is a winner of numerous local and international awards for his films and music videos.

Award	Year
Pomegranate Film Festival	2014
The Window to Europe	2014
Armenian Music Awards	1999, 2007
AMWA	2005
Armenian National Music Awards	2005, 2007

In 2011 Hrachya Keshishyan was awarded the Movses Khorenatsi Medal. Honored Culture Figure of the Republic of Armenia, 2018.
