= Ministry of Transport and Communication (Armenia) =

Government ministry of Armenia

The Ministry of Transport and Communication of Armenia (Armenian: Հայաստանի Տրանսպորտի և Կապի Նախարարություն, Hayastani Hanrapetowt’yan Transporti ew Kapi Naxararowt’yown) was a government ministry in Armenia. The head office was located in Yerevan. It was abolished in 2019. The last minister was Hakob Arshakyan.

== Departments ==
Departments within the ministry include the Transport Department, Department of Communication, Department of Post, Department of Information, the Railway Department, the Road Construction Department, the Financial-Economic and Accounting Department, the Legal Department, and the Foreign Relations and Programmes Department.

The Ministry also oversees the Armenian Space Agency and the Yerevan Metro.

== See also ==
- Mass media in Armenia
- Roads in Armenia
- Road signs in Armenia
- Telecommunications in Armenia
- Transport in Armenia
