= Edik =

Edik is a masculine given name. Notable people with the name include:

- Edik Baghdasaryan, Armenian journalist
- Edik Korchagin (born 1979), Russian footballer
- Edik Sajaia (born 1981), Georgian footballer
