= David Spanier =

David Graham Spanier (30 April 1932 – 18 April 2000) was a British journalist.

== Biography ==
Born in Hampstead, London, into a liberal Jewish family, Spanier was educated at Charterhouse School and Trinity College, Cambridge. After completing national service in the British Army, he began his journalism career at the Yorkshire Post before joining The Times in 1957.

At The Times, Spanier held various positions, including Commonwealth correspondent and Europe economics specialist. In 1971, he was named European Journalist of the Year by the Association of European Journalists. In 1974, he became the newspaper's diplomatic correspondent, notably declining the individual briefing typically provided by the Foreign Office.

Following Rupert Murdoch's acquisition of The Times, Spanier left the publication in early 1982. He then worked as a diplomatic correspondent for LBC Radio and Independent Radio News. Spanier also contributed to chess journalism for the newspaper Today and later for the Daily Telegraph. His written works include Total Poker (1977), Easy Money (1987), and The Little Book of Poker (1998), which compiled his poker columns.

Spanier was married to fashion journalist Suzy Menkes in 1969, and they had three sons and a daughter who died in infancy.
