= Armenian soap operas =

The first Armenian soap operas (Armenian: Հայկական սերիալներ Haykakan serialner) appeared in the mid-2000s. Most are produced by the three main TV channels Armenia TV, Shant TV and the Public Television of Armenia. Although they are highly popular, Armenian soap operas have been criticized by many intellectuals.

== List ==
Name	Years	Channel	Ref
Vorogayt (Որոգայթ, "Trap")	2008–2009	Shant TV	
Djvar aprust (Դժվար ապրուստ, "Hard life")		Armenia TV	
Anna Աննա	2009–2010	H1	
Generali akhjike (Գեներալի աղջիկը, "General's daughter")		H1	
Tigrani molorake (Տիգրանի մոլորակը, "Tigran's planet")		H1	
Vorbere (Որբերը, "Orphans")		H1	
Harazat tshnami (Հարազատ թշնամի, "Own Enemy")		Armenia TV	
Hreshtakneri dprots (Հրեշտակների դպրոց, "School of Angels")		H1	

== Popularity ==
Serials occupy 30% of the airtime in Armenia. The high ratings of Armenian serials have been described as "abnormal." According to various statistics 40% to 50% of the Armenian population watches serials. TV expert Tigran Safaryan claims it shows the low level of media management in the country.

== Criticism ==
Armenian soap operas have been widely criticized by artists, intellectuals, psychologists and ethnographers. ArmeniaNow wrote in 2012 that "the criticism of serials in Armenia has, itself, become a show." The serials have reportedly been widely criticized for "advocating aggression, domestic violence, misfortunes and hard living" which allegedly has "a dysfunctional influence on audiences, which makes half of Armenia’s population"; critics are said to be particularly concerned about the serials' possible psychological impact on young people. Producers confront critics saying they give "people what the people want" and simply "reflect the real life", "trying to expose major problems of the society." During the 2013 presidential election campaign, Armenian President Serzh Sargsyan supported the idea of TV serials while addressing a crowd in Yerevan's Arabkir district. She stated that the shows create jobs for actors, who can't live working only at theaters.

=== Opinions ===
Historian and researcher Samvel Karapetyan stated in 2009 that he feels ashamed for Armenian serials and rhetorically asked, "Did we evolve from monkeys?" In June 2013, Karapetyan released a video on his YouTube channel strongly criticizing serials and labeling them as "anti-national".

Psychologist Karine Nalchajyan stated that TV serials negatively affect people and preach immoral and often criminal behavior. She claimed that serials are a threat to Armenia's national security.

Comedian Mkrtich Arzumanyan, better known by his stage name Mko, said that serial producers were "chasing for ratings" without taking into consideration their influence on people. He said that he gets the impression he lives in Chechnya after watching some of the criminal and warlike scenes from serials.

Playwright Karine Khodikyan suggested that Armenian serials are just part of the whole "cultural degradation" in the country. Actor Rafael Kotanjyan stated that serials "pose a growing threat to the development of tourism in Armenia." He says that many of his friends living outside of Armenia are now wary of sending their children to Armenia alone.

IT security expert Vahram Mirakyan conducted research on the influence on soap operas and authored "Formation of Aggressive Social Positions in Mass Media". Mirakyan claims that the "aggressive content [of Armenian soap operas] has a dysfunctional influence upon the audience." According to Mirakyan, the soap operas are "antisocial". At the same time, he says that they have great influence on the public as "the factor of influence and the target have common culture, language and social reality." According to his study, episodes with aggression and depression are more frequent than episodes with neutral content. Mirakyan claims that Armenian soap operas bring "change in language-thinking, when especially schoolchildren start speaking in a special criminal sub-cultural dialect."
