= List of programs broadcast by Public Television Company of Armenia =

This is a list of television programs which are currently, formerly, or are soon to be broadcast on Public Television Company of Armenia.

== Current programming of Armenia 1 ==
=== News and information ===
- Agenda
- The First on Economics
- Parliamentary Week
- Agenda: Interview
- At the Square
- 360°
- Off the Agenda
- Journalism by Profession
- First Pavilion

=== Dramas ===
- Open Your Eyes
- For Love
- Against the Flow

=== Game shows ===
- Love Formula
- Bonus
- Hay-Q
- Hayastan Jan
- Armenian Knight

=== Reality/other ===
- Lets cook together
- Nice Evening
- National Music Channel
- Musical Post
- National Music Awards
- National Music Awards Diary
- Emmy - First CD Presentation Solo Concert
- Hot 10
- Top 10
- Top 50
- Top 2007
- Top 2008
- Top 2009
- Top 2010
- Top 2011
- Top 2012
- Two Stars
- Two Stars Diary
- 32 Teeth Club
- Open Project
- Foreign games
- Rubicon
- Rubicon +
- Made in USSR
- Golden Clarinet
- Resolution
- Europolis
- Late Night
- Saturday Evering with Ashot Ghazaryan
- Health
- Sanatorium
- The First Program
- The First Wave Cafe
- Fairy-Tale Calling
- Once Upon A Time
- Faces
- Quality Mark
- Mechanics of Happiness
- Found Dream
- Canticle of Canticles
- For Love
- Open Lesson
- Cities of the World
- Quotation Marks
- On the Roads of Armenia
- The Devotees
- Armed Forces
- Life on Border
- Tandem

== Former programming ==
- Benefis
- Name that Tune
- With the Whole Family
- Towards Artsakh

== See also ==
- Television in Armenia
