= Tert =

Tert may refer to:

- tert-, a chemical descriptor prefix used to designate tertiary atoms in molecules
- Telomerase reverse transcriptase
- Tert.am, an Armenian news website
- Tertangala, a magazine from the University of Wollongong now known as The Tert
