= Hrazdan TV =

Hrazdan TV Company Հրազդան հեռուստաընկերություն
- Type: Free-to-air, television and online
- Country: Armenia
- Headquarters: Hrazdan
- Owner: Private
- Launch date: 1991

Hrazdan TV Company (Armenian: Հրազդան հեռուստաընկերություն) is a private TV company in Hrazdan, Armenia, founded by the family of Harutyunyan within the framework of "Sirak" Limited Liability Company. The family also publishes a private newspaper and runs a radio company known as Hrazdan Radio. The channel has been broadcasting since 1 September 1991, covering the Kotayk Province and some parts of the Gegharkunik Province.

The number of Hrazdan TV viewers is around 220,000.

The TV broadcasts some political programmes that concentrate on issues such as corruption, press freedom and society concerning problems in Armenia. It also produces entertaining shows and projects about Armenian folk music to keep the Armenian heritage of traditions alive.

== See also ==
- Television in Armenia
