= Golos Armenii =

Russian-language newspaper in Armenia

- Cover of June 5, 2014, issue of Golos Armenii
- Editor-in-chief: Flora Nashkharian
- Founded: 1934
- Language: Russian language
- Headquarters: Yerevan
- Circulation: 3,500 (as of early 2000s)
- OCLC number: 22522583
- Website: golosarmenii.am

Golos Armenii (Russian: Голос Армении, "Voice of Armenia"), previously known as Kommunist («Коммунист», "[The] Communist"), is a Russian language newspaper published in Yerevan, Armenia.

== Soviet period ==
The newspaper was founded in 1934. During the Soviet period it was a daily organ of the Central Committee of the Communist Party of Armenia and the Yerevan City Committee of the Communist Party. In the 1940s and 1950s, Veniamin Andreevich Syrtsev served as editor of the newspaper. As of 1972, it had a circulation of 45,000.

== Independent Armenia ==
Kommunist became Golos Armenii in August 1990. As of 1991, it was still an organ of the Communist Party, and was issued six times a week. B. M. Mkrtchyan served as the editor during this period. In the post-Soviet period, it became a thrice-weekly newspaper. Flora Nashkharian took over as editor-in-chief in 1992. Nashkharian worked at Kommunist since 1976, serving as its first deputy editor in the latter years.

As of the mid-1990s, Golos Armenii had a circulation of about 5,000, twelve journalists employed and around twenty other staff members. It was strongly opposed to the presidency of Levon Ter-Petrossyan. The newspaper was closed down by the government on May 11, 1995, in the midst of a dispute over rent of its editorial office. The closure was seen as a move to silence an opposition voice in the media. Shamiram Aghabekian served as deputy editor of Golos Armenii for a period, before becoming the editor-in-chief of Respublika Armenia (the Russian version of the government gazette Hayastani Hanrapetutyun) in 1998. In 1999, Golos Armenii claimed a circulation of 5,230. It was sold for around 100 Armenian dram per copy. The newspaper was printed in A2 format, with four pages. As of the early 2000s, it was estimated to have a circulation of 3,500. It was perceived as close to the government of Robert Kocharyan.

== See also ==
- Media of Armenia
