= Artsakh Public TV =

Artsakh Public Radio and TV Company or Artsakh TV
- Type: Television network, radio network
- Country: Republic of Artsakh
- Availability: Artsakh
- Headquarters: Stepanakert, Artsakh
- Owner: Government of Artsakh
- Launch date: 1 June 1988
- Dissolved: 25 September 2023

Artsakh Public Radio and TV Company (Armenian: Արցախի հանրային հեռուստաընկերություն) or Artsakh TV (Armenian: Արցախի հեռուստատեսություն) was a television channel that broadcast in Nagorno-Karabakh from 1 June 1988 until 2023.

== History ==
Television in the Nagorno Karabakh Autonomous Region was established within the scope of foundation programs of local television companies in the former Soviet Union Autonomous republics and regions. The implementation of the program was delayed because of the policy carried out by Azerbaijan against the ethnic Armenian population of the region. The dream of the Artsakh nation to have television alongside regional radio with a biography of about six decades came true in 1988. In 2003, with passing the law "On Television and Radio" Artsakh TV gained public status.

The TV channel offers news, covering major national and international events as well as focusing on domestic issues, public, political, cultural, religious, sports, youth, children's and juvenile, as well as entertainment programs. Norek Gasparyan was Chairman of the Artsakh Public TV and Radio company's Board. The number of potential television audience was around 130,000.

Until 2013, it was the only local television station. The regional monopoly was broken when an independent company, National Radio and Television, started radio broadcasts in 2012, hoping to start television in 2013. At the time, Artsakh Public TV broadcast for four hours a day. On 6 January 2019, the channel was broadcasting on Intelsat 33e in high definition.

On 1 March 2019, the terrestrial broadcast of the channel in Artsakh doubled its airtime from four hours to eight. Its radio counterpart increased from a five-hour schedule to a 24-hour service.

The last chairman of the company's board was Norek Gasparyan.

On September 25, 2023, following the fighting in Nagorno-Karabakh and the exodus of the Armenian population from the region, the Artsakh Television and Radio Company ceased its broadcasts; in the process, 35 years of archived material were largely lost. In July 2024, several former employees of the company announced the creation of the NGO "10th Province" in Armenia, whose objective is to produce voluntary reports aimed at a refugee audience and disseminate them through the social media of the former television and radio company.

Artsakh Public Television officially relaunched its online broadcasts on July 1, 2024, operating from Armenia following the exodus of the Armenian population and the dissolution of the Republic of Artsakh (NKR) in September 2023. The project relies on a small team and focuses on preserving cultural identity and social ties.

== See also ==
- Public Television of Armenia
