= CS Media =

Armenian media company

Coordinates: 40°12′43.25″N 44°29′16″E

CS Media, also known as Armenia Media Holding, is a major media company, located in Yerevan, the capital of Armenia. Armenian-American businessman and philanthropist Gerard Cafesjian is a major shareholder in the business. It was founded on 4 September 2004.

== Network ==
CS Media includes a number of Armenian leading media companies in what it calls the "CS Media City" on approximately 40,000 square meters which include television and radio studios, various offices, a concert hall, cinema, publishing house, and restaurant.

CS Media has the following outlets:

- Armenia TV, with broadcasting network throughout Armenia, Republic of Artsakh and via satellite worldwide with transmissions covering Europe, the Middle East, Russia and the United States.
- ArmNews, a 24-hours news TV-Channel covering local and international news, and beaming at times EuroNews International programs.
- First Channel, presenting CNN TV-Channel in Armenia
- Radio 107, a 24-hour FM radio station
- CS Records, recording studio functioning in Armenia. It provides a complete volume of music production and recording.
- A-UP Company, the satellite broadcaster of CS Media companies.
- CS Publishing House publishing a daily newspaper, magazine and a TV-Guide. It has expanded internationally buying and publishing the Armenian Reporter in two print editions in the United States through offices in Paramus, New Jersey, Burbank, California, Washington, D.C., and in Yerevan. It intends to expand further the publishing of new print-press.

== See also ==
- Mass media in Armenia
