= Cultural Channel (Armenia) =

Armenian cultural TV channel

Cultural Channel Մշակութային Ալիք
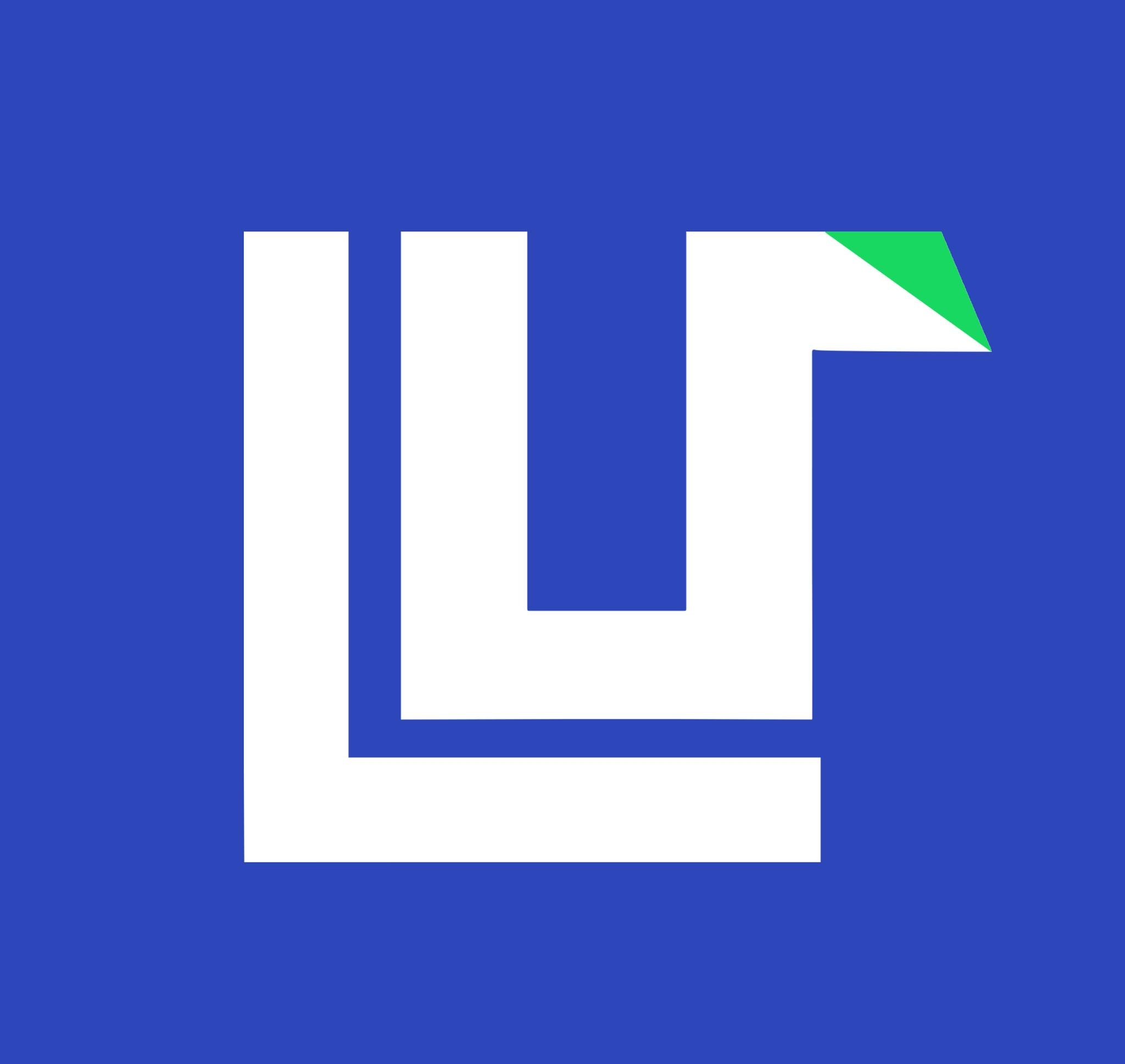
- Country: Armenia
- Headquarters: Yerevan

Programming
- Picture format: 16:9 576i

Ownership
- Owner: Arthur Hakobyan

History
- Launched: 2014
- Former names: A21TV Armenia, ART21 TV

Links
- Website: www.armculturalchannel.com

Cultural Channel (Armenian: Մշակութային Ալիք, romanized: Mshakut'ayin Alik') is a cultural television company in Armenia.

== History ==
The channel was founded by Arthur Hakobyan as A21TV on 29 March 2014 in Yerevan. A21TV was renamed to Cultural Channel on 23 January 2017.

In 2011, it became the sole cultural TV channel, a status it has retained to date. In 2014, the channel initiated collaborations with Deven, Disney, Domino, Nvero+, and other companies.

On 22 June 2014, "ART21 TV" launched a new website. Currently, their audience reaches viewers in Armenia and Russia. The channel is available on cable networks.

The TV channel, established to address the void in cultural and educational programming, has been actively producing numerous cultural programs, documentaries, and charity projects. In February 2015, the TV channel started regular IPTV broadcasts across Armenia and in the United States. In 2016, Cultural Channel organized the first cultural television competition-festival, "Cultural Channel Awards Ceremony", during which prizes were awarded to young people who won in the categories of fine arts, cinematography, and clothing modeling.

In 2017, commemorating its foundation, the TV channel received a letter of appreciation from the Ministry of Culture, acknowledging its substantial contribution to the promotion of Armenian cultural values.

== See also ==
- Television in Armenia
