= Yerkir Media =

Armenian television channel

- Country: Armenia
- Broadcast area: Armenia
- Headquarters: Yerevan

Programming
- Language: Armenian

Ownership
- Owner: Armenian Revolutionary Federation

History
- Launched: May 28, 2004
- Replaced: ART 13

Links
- Website: yerkirmedia.am

Availability

Terrestrial
- DTT: Channel 7

Yerkir Media (Armenian: Երկիր Մեդիա, literally "World Media") is an Armenian television station that began operating in 2004. It is the first television station affiliated with a political party: the Armenian Revolutionary Federation.

== See also ==
- Television in Armenia
- Yerkir
