= Hetq =

Online newspaper

Hetq Investigative Journalists of Armenia NGO
- Type: Online news site
- Format: Web
- Owner: Investigative Journalists NGO
- Editor: Edik Baghdasaryan
- Staff writers: 12
- Founded: August 21, 2001
- Political alignment: Non-partisan
- Headquarters: 1/3, Buzand street, 8th floor Yerevan, Armenia
- Website: hetq.am

Hetq (Armenian: Հետք, lit. 'Trace') is an online newspaper published in Yerevan by the Investigative Journalists NGO. It first appeared in 2001 in the Armenian language, and since 2002 it has been publishing in English as well.

The Investigative Journalists of Armenia NGO is a non-government organization founded on 29 July 2000, and juridically was registered on Armenia on August 21, 2001, with the primary goal of assisting the development of investigative journalism in Armenia and to strengthen and develop freedom of speech and democratic principles. Legal registration in Armenia territory as an organization, Hetq done on March 15, 2004.

== History ==
Since 2001 the organization has produced investigative films and articles on environmental, social, educational, cultural, judicial, energy, banking system, and other issues within the scope of different projects. These investigations have revealed various abuses by state and local government as well as the violation of human rights.

Since 2001, the organization has published the Hetq Online internet newspaper: The English version of Hetq Online has been published since September 2002, thus garnering authority and credibility amongst foreign readers for the organization.

The investigative articles of Hetq Online are republished by leading Armenian daily newspapers. Hetq Online is the first publication in Armenia to adopt a code of ethics and every journalist working with the online newspaper is obliged to follow the principles of the code.

== Membership ==
Investigative journalism NGO is a member of the following organizations:

- Since 2003: Global Investigative Journalism Network
- Since 2005: Association of European Journalists
- Since 2007: Organized Crime and Corruption Reporting Project (OCCRP)

== See also ==
- Media in Armenia
