= News.am =

Armenian news agency

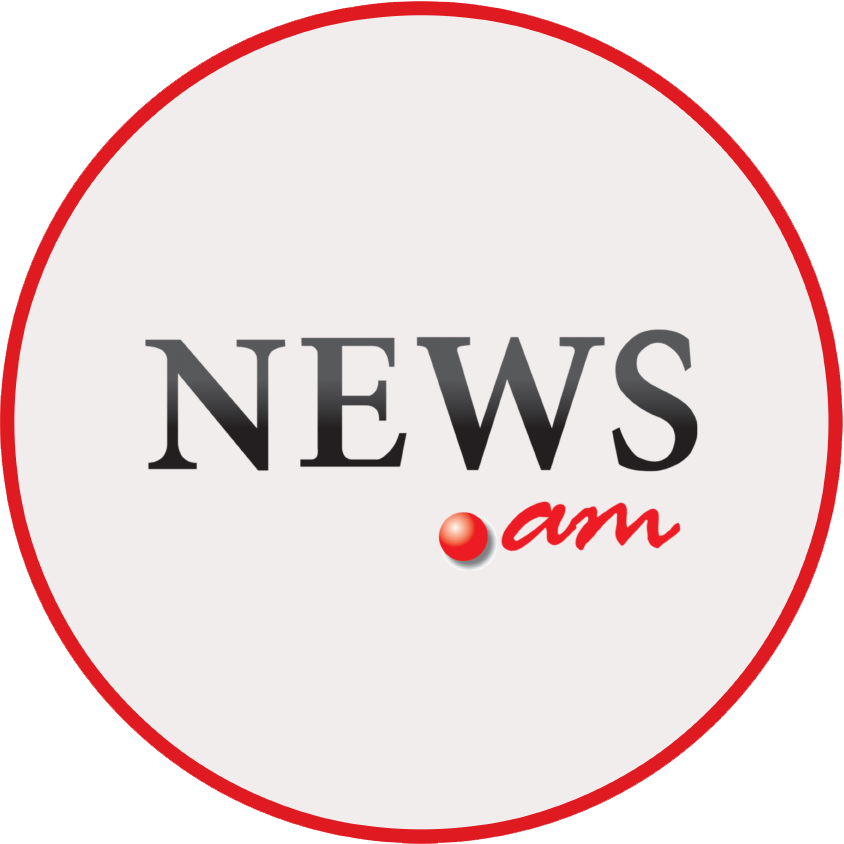
- Industry: News agency
- Founded: 2009
- Headquarters: Yerevan, Armenia
- Website: news.am

News.am is an Armenian news agency based in Yerevan. The main topics of the agency are the social, political and economic developments in Armenia and Nagorno-Karabakh, as well as Diaspora communities around the world. It also focuses on the topical events, problems, and trends in the South Caucasus region. The agency provides news content in multiple languages, including English, Armenian, Russian, and Turkish. It also features media monitoring of press and electronic outlets from countries such as Armenia, Georgia, Turkey, Russia, Iran, and Azerbaijan, as well as major international publications. In addition to news reporting, News.am publishes interviews, analytical pieces, commentary, reports, and photographs. The platform also disseminates topical bulletins and facilitates events such as press conferences, round tables, and seminars.

== See also ==
- Media of Armenia
