= Telecommunications in Armenia =

Telecommunications in Armenia
Landlines (2008):	2.1 million
Mobile lines (2009):	4.5 million
ccTLD:	.am.հայ
Calling code:	+374

Telecommunications in Armenia involves the availability and use of electronic devices and services, such as the telephone, television, radio or computer, for the purpose of communication. The various telecommunications systems found and used in Armenia includes radio, television, fixed and mobile telephones, and the internet.

== Mobile ==
As of 2017, Armenia has 3.5 million mobile subscribers in total, and a 120% penetration rate.

Rank	Operator	Technology	Subscribers (in millions)	Ownership
1	Viva Armenia	GSM-900/1800 MHz (GPRS, EDGE); UMTS-900/2100 MHz (Band: B1/B8) (UMTS, HSDPA); LTE, LTE-A, VoLTE, VoWiFi; LTE-1800/2600 MHz (Band: B3/B7) (LTE), 5G	2.2 (Q1 2022)	Fedilco Group
2	Team	GSM-900/1800 MHz (GPRS, EDGE); UMTS-900/2100 MHz (Band: B1/B8) (UMTS, HSDPA); LTE-A (900 MHz, 1800 MHz)	1.0 (November 2017)	Telecom Armenia OJSC
3	Ucom	GSM-900/1800 MHz (GPRS, EDGE); UMTS-900/2100 MHz (Band: B1/B8) UMTS, HSDPA; LTE-800/1800/2600 MHz (Band: B3/B7/B20) (LTE-A), VoLTE, 5G	0.933 (December 2017)	Ucom

There are three mobile phone operators currently in Armenia: Viva, Team and Ucom. All three offer both 2G and 3G as well as 4G services. All three networks are widely modern and reliable with shops located in major towns and cities where one can purchase a sim card or get assistance if needed. Most unlocked mobile phones are able to be used on roaming, however, network charges apply. Ucom and Viva are often recommended to tourists due to the variety of tariffs available and the help available in a variety of languages.

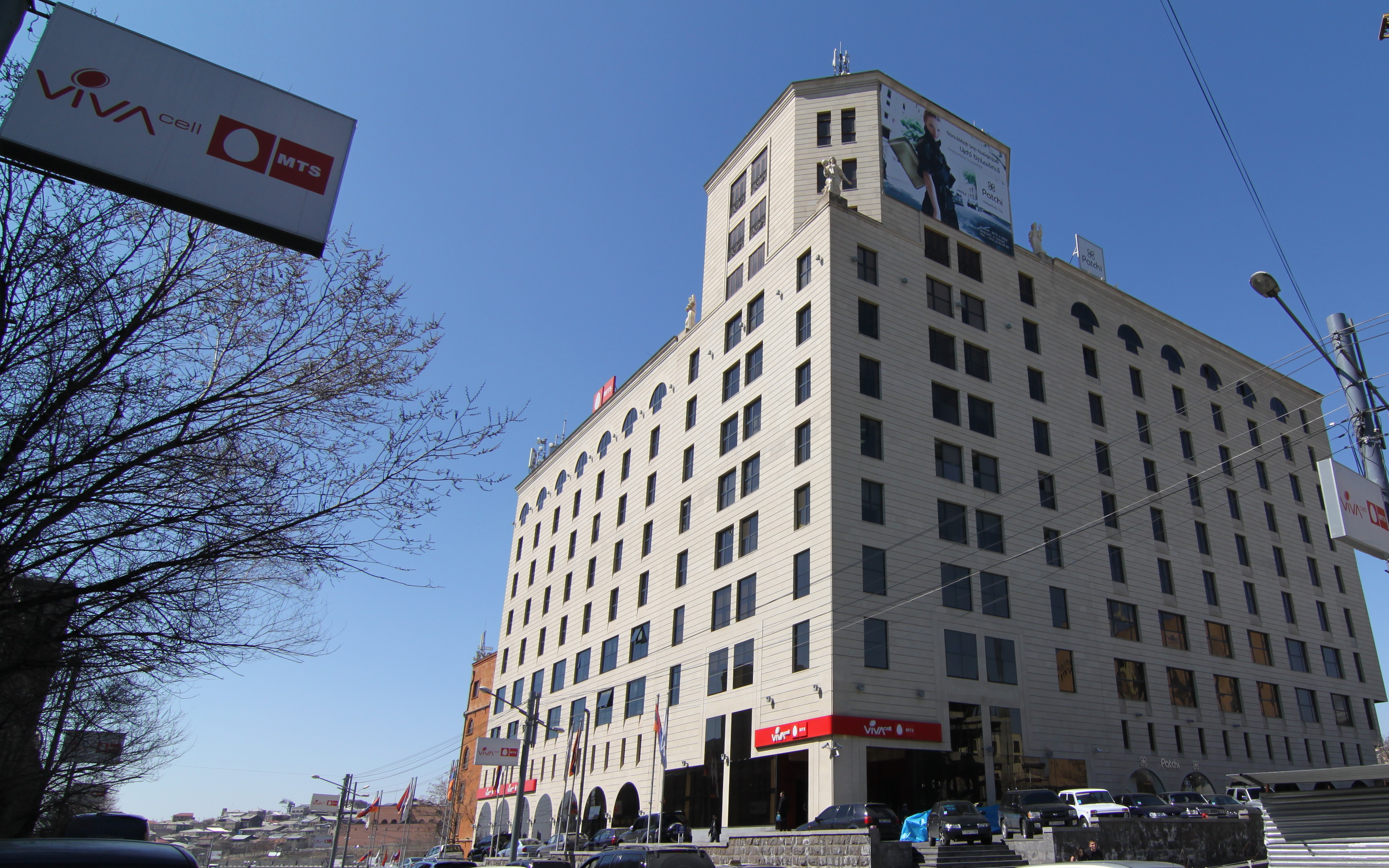
Headquarters of Viva Armenia, Armenia's leading mobile services provider

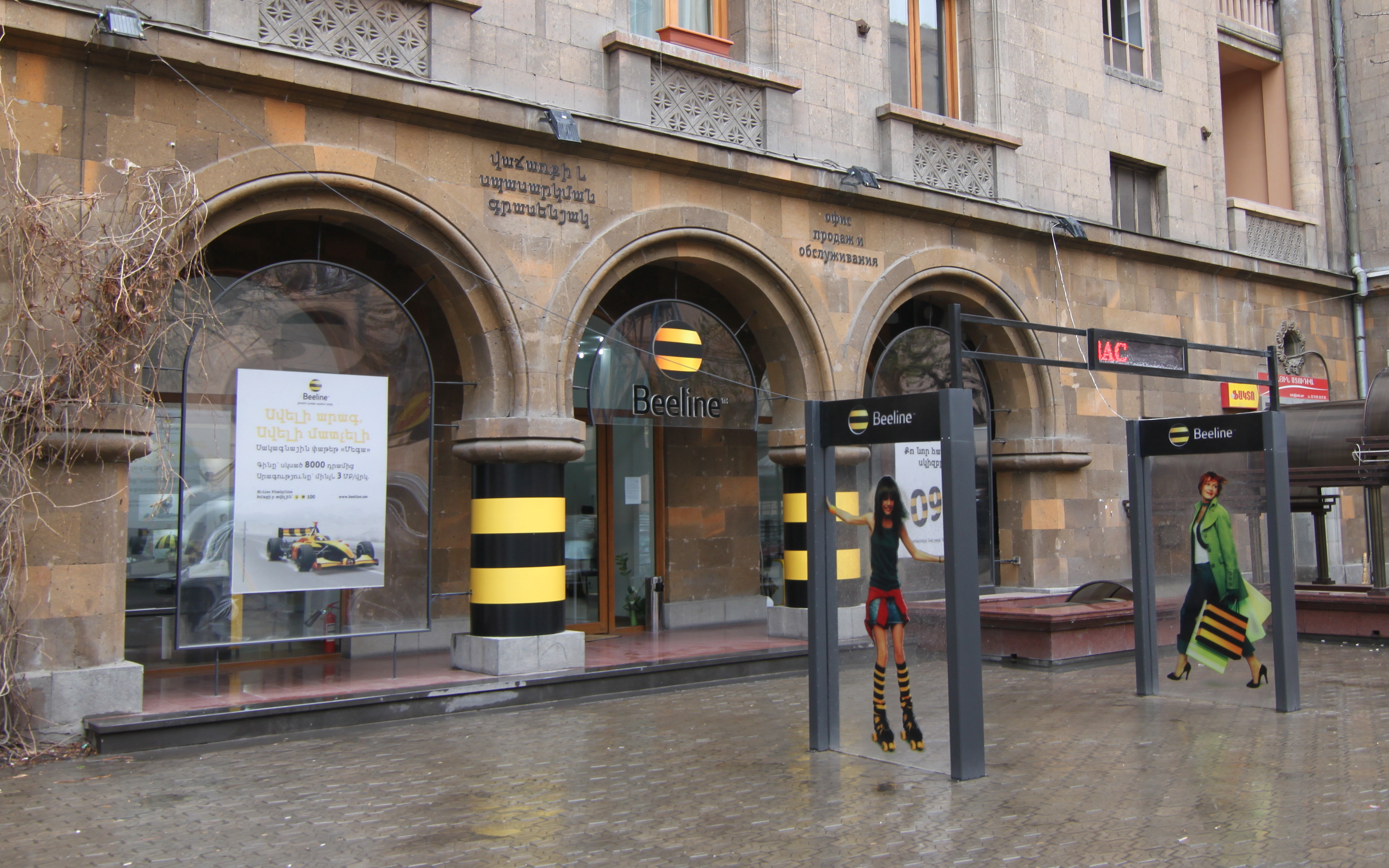
A Beeline service store on Amiryan Street in downtown Yerevan

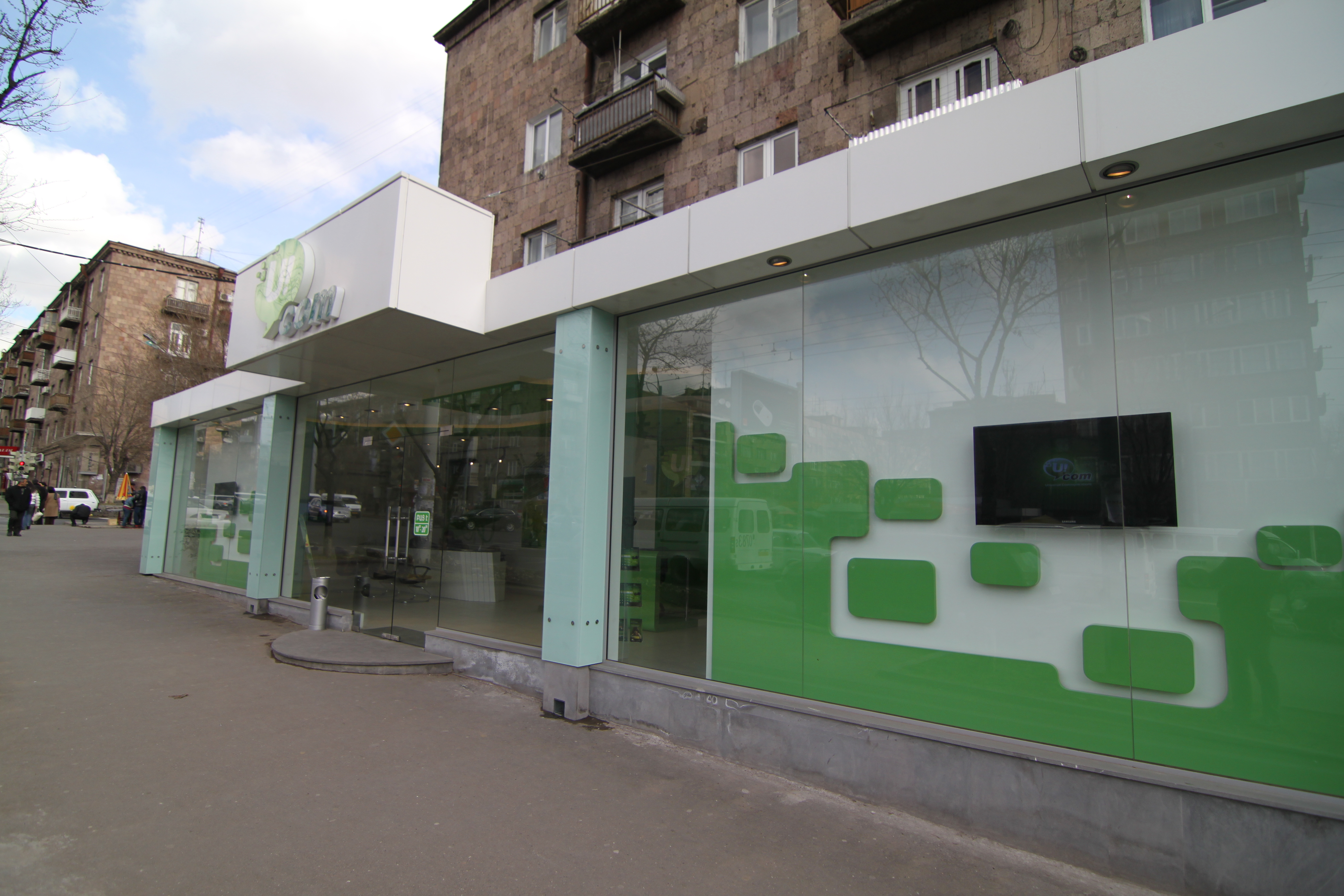
A Ucom service store in Yerevan's Arabkir district

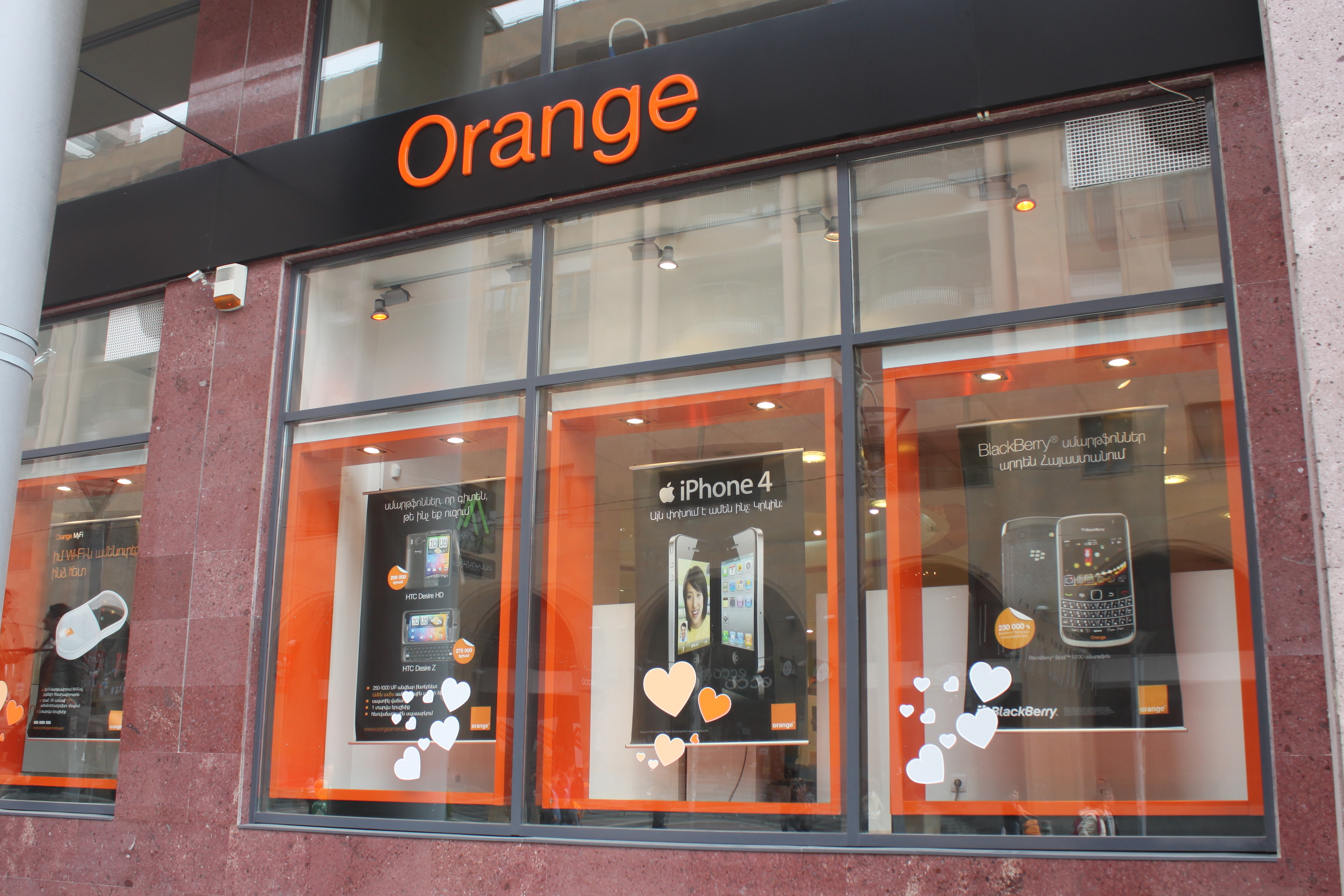
A window display at Orange's flagship Northern Avenue branch advertises various smartphones and a 3G Internet WiFi router. In November 2009, Orange became Armenia's third mobile telecommunications provider, offering a very competitively priced 3G Internet plan. After Ucom bought Orange's shares in 2015, Orange service stores were changed into Ucom stores.

As of 2012, approximately 90% of all main lines are digitized. The remaining 10% is in modernization process.

=== International system ===
Yerevan is connected to the Trans-Asia-Europe fiber-optic cable via Georgia. Additional international service is available by microwave radio relay and landline connections to other countries of the Commonwealth of Independent States, the Moscow international switch and by satellite. The main backbones of Armenian networks are made by E3 or STM-1 lines via microwave units across whole country with many passive retranslations.

== Wire telephone services ==
Traditionally, Armenia has well-developed landline telephone services. According to official statistic data of the International Telecommunication Union, as of 2017 there were 505,190 fixed telephone service subscribers in Armenia (residents and businesses) or 17.24 subscribers per 100 inhabitants. The number of fixed telephone users have significantly declined as compared with the previous 10 years from 20.41 in 2006. The main reason for the decline is mobile-fixed substitution.

== Radio ==
As of 2008, Armenia has 9 AM stations, 17 FM stations, and one shortwave station. Additionally, there are approximately 850,000 radios in existence. The primary network provider is TRBNA.

== Television ==
Armenia has 48 private television stations alongside 2 public networks with major Russian channels widely available throughout the country. In 2008, TRBNA upgraded the main circuit to a digital distribution system based on DVB-IP and MPEG2 standards. According to the Television Association Committee of Armenia, TV penetration rate is 80% according to 2011 data.

== Internet ==
As of 2009, there were approximately 1,400,000 Internet users and approximately 65,279 Internet hosts in Armenia. The country code (Top level domain) for Armenia is .am, which has been used for AM radio stations and for domain hacks.

The national communications company Armentel's (now Telecom Armenia OJSC) only fiber optic connection to the Internet enters Armenia through Georgia (via Marneuli) and then connects to the rest of the Internet via an undersea fiber-optic cable in the Black Sea. Armenia is connected to the Trans-Asia-Europe fiber-optic cable system via Georgia, which runs along the railroad from Poti to Tbilisi to the Armenian border near Marneuli. At Poti, the TAE cable connects to the undersea Georgia-Russia system KAFOS which then connects to the Black Sea Fiber Optic Cable System. The BSFOCS is co-owned by Armentel. GNC-Alfa is the largest independent internet and data provider in Armenia with 1,500 km fibre-optic cable infrastructure, and covering 70% of Armenia.

=== Dial-up ===
Dial-up was the main type of connectivity in Armenia for several years. The United Nations Development Programme (UNDP) supported dial-up internet, starting with an office in Armenia in 1997, and developing a network called "Freenet" that reached 6000 users by the year 2000, with 1000 websites and each user having 3 Mb of email storage space and 3 Mb of website storage. By 2004, usage grew to 21,000 users and 3000 websites, with increased storage. A local "Yerevan Internet Exchange" was established, initial based on radio connections and by 2004 mostly on DSL connections. The UNDP viewed the role of the internet as promoting democracy, with online forums discussing human rights, the environment, political parties and the Armenian constitution. In 2008, dial-up connections expanded when Telecom Armenia OJSC (Beeline TM) started operation of an ADSL network and together with VivaCell-MTS (now Viva Armenia) and Orange Armenia also introduced portable USB-modems, which are operated mainly in 3G networks and are still very popular in rural areas especially in small mountainous villages where landline connectivity is not available.

=== Broadband ===
According to official statistics from the International Telecommunication Union, the number of broadband subscribers in Armenia in 2017 was 315,319 users or 10.76 users per 100 persons.

==== ADSL ====
A major part of DSL connectivity is offered by Telecom Armenia OJSC (Beeline TM). Some other ISPs (Arminco, WEB, Bionet and others) also offer DSL connectivities mainly using leased infrastructure of Telecom Armenia OJSC.

==== WiMAX ====
Rapid development of WiMAX was recorded in 2008–2010. Two WiMAX providers, namely Icon Communications and Cornet Ltd. operating in the 3.6–3.8 GHz band using IEEE 802.16e reached 2000 users each, but shortly disappeared from the market due to strong competition with ADSL and FTTB operators. Cornet was closed and Icon Communications was acquired by Telecom Armenia OJSC (Beeline TM).

==== FTTB ====
Fibre to the building broadband connectivity is offered by at least four major operators, namely Viva Armenia, Ucom, Telecom Armenia OJSC (operated under Beeline TM) and GNC-Alfa (operated under Rostelecom TM). All three companies offer triple play services including internet, IPTV and telephone services.

=== Internet censorship ===
Listed as engaged in substantial filtering in the political area and selective filtering in the social, conflict/security, and internet tools areas by the OpenNet Initiative (ONI) in November 2010.

Access to the internet in Armenia is largely unfettered, although evidence of second and third-generation filtering is mounting. Armenia's political climate is volatile and largely unpredictable. In times of political unrest, the government has not hesitated to put in place restrictions on the internet as a means to curtail public protest and discontent. According to Article 11 of the Law of the Republic of Armenia on Police, law enforcement has the right to block content to prevent criminal activity.

Armenia's internet access is delivered by Russian providers, occasionally resulting in censorship by Russian ISPs. In 2012 Russian authorities blocked kavkazcenter.com, resulting in it being blocked in Armenia. In 2014 five other websites were blocked due to filtering by the Russian telecommunications regulator Roskomnadzor. ISPs claimed the blocks were due to technical error and were removed.

=== 2011 Armenian internet outage ===
The 2011 Armenian internet outage occurred in April 2011 when an elderly woman from Georgia accidentally cut through an underground cable giving internet access to Armenia.

== International cooperation ==
Armenia is a member of the European Telecommunications Satellite Organization, the International Telecommunications Satellite Organization, the International Telecommunication Union, and the International Amateur Radio Union.

Armenia has also ratified the Budapest Convention on Cybercrime and the Constitution and Convention of the International Telecommunication Union.

In 2019, Armenia joined the "EU's Cybersecurity East Project" by the European Union Agency for Cybersecurity. The project aims at improving cybersecurity and fostering cooperation with the EU.

== See also ==
- ArmCosmos
- Media of Armenia
- Ministry of Transport and Communication (Armenia)
