= Arminco =

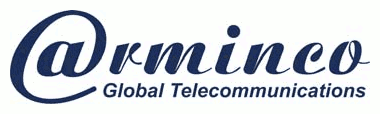
- Industry: Internet service provider
- Founded: 1992
- Headquarters: Yerevan, Armenia
- Area served: Armenia
- Website: www.arminco.com

Arminco (Armenian Internet Company) is an Armenian telecommunications company founded in Yerevan in 1992 which became the first commercial Internet Service Provider (ISP) in May 1994. Under General Director Andranik Alexanian, the company had established Armenia's first Internet protocol suite and email services in Armenia. Following the 1997 grant of a 15-year national telecommunications monopoly to ArmenTel, ARMINCO face multiple service disruptions which were caused by ArmenTel as the exclusive right owner to provide telecommunication services to other company in Armenia.

== History ==
ARMINCO (Armenian Internet Company Ltd.) is a semi-private small business located in Yerevan. It was founded in 1992 by Institute for Automated Systems from Soviet Union, State Long-Distance Phone Switch of Armenia and the National Service for Seismic Protection of Armenia. Its first activity was becoming a regional packet-switching node of the Institute for Automated Systems Network (IASNet). IASNET was the first packet-switching network in Soviet Union. It used X.25 as the base. Then, in March 1994, ARMINCO built Internet protocol suite which connected with SOVAM-Teleport in Moscow and became the first internet service provider in Armenia in May 1994. At that time, it serves 300 users in Armenia with 25 employee which led by Andranik Alexanian as general director.At the same year, the company also started providing email services in 1994.

== Conflict with Armentel ==
In 1997, Armentel become the exclusive right owner to provide telecommunications services and broadband video transmission services including cable television in Armenia for 15 years.This situation led to Arminco to lease their service to Armentel. Then, in September 1998, the company got internet disconnections, and this situation had happened multiple times, which is under responsibility of Armentel as the exclusive right owner of the service. Arminco had appealed to use another provider for their service to government of Armenia, but it was rejected by Artak Vardanian, Minister of Communications because of the exclusive right which was owned by Armentel. Then in 13 August 2002, Armentel cut off connection of Arminco by accusing them of running illegal practices.The disconnection affected 4,000 users who were deprived of their Internet access.

== See also ==
- Internet in Armenia
