= Mass media in Armenia =

Overview of the mass media in Armenia

The mass media in Armenia refers to mass media outlets based in Armenia. Television, magazines, and newspapers are all operated by both state-owned and for-profit corporations which depend on advertising, subscription, and other sales-related revenues. Press freedom improved after the 2018 Velvet Revolution, and by 2025 Armenia had risen to 34th place in the World Press Freedom Index.

The Constitution of Armenia guarantees freedom of speech, yet media freedom remains limited by a polarised media environment, political pressure on journalists, and frequent defamation lawsuits. In the 2026 Press Freedom Index compiled by Reporters Without Borders (RSF), Armenia ranked 50th out of 180 countries, down from 34th in 2025, while remaining the highest-ranked country in the South Caucasus. RSF recorded a decline in all five of its indicators and moved Armenia into its "problematic" category. In Freedom House's Freedom in the World 2026 report, Armenia was rated "Partly Free" with a score of 54 out of 100, unchanged from the previous year.

== Legislative framework ==
Article 27 of the Constitution of Armenia guarantees freedom of speech and freedom of the press. The Constitution also guarantees the freedom of the mass media and obliges the state to guarantee the existence and activities of an independent public radio and television service. Article 47 of the Constitution prohibits incitement to national, racial and religious hatred and the propaganda of violence. The Constitution also establishes the right to seek, receive, convey and disseminate information and provide foreigners with the same rights to information as citizens. In practice, these laws have often been applied unevenly.

Criminal liability for defamation was eliminated in 2010, but the civil code established high monetary penalties, up to 2,000 times the minimum salary. A draft amendment that would make online media liable for defamatory comments was put forward in 2014; it was postponed sine die after domestic and international criticisms.

Until 2020, broadcasting was governed by the Law on Television and Radio of 2000. It guaranteed the freedom to select, produce and broadcast programmes and prohibited censorship (Article 4). It also established the Public TV and Radio Company as a state enterprise with special status (Article 28), managed by a Public TV Council of five members appointed by the President, and created the National Commission on Television and Radio (NCTR) to license and monitor private broadcasters (Article 37).

The 2010 amendments to the Law on Television and Radio were negatively assessed by the OSCE RFoM, as failing to promote media pluralism in the digital age, despite amendments. The shortcomings include "a limit to the number of broadcast channels; a lack of clear rules for the licensing of satellite, mobile telephone and online broadcasting; the placement of all forms of broadcasting under a regime of licensing or permission by the Regulator; the granting of authority to the courts to terminate broadcast licences based on provisions in the law that contain undue limitations on freedom of the media; and a lack of procedures and terms for the establishment of private digital channels."

A Freedom of information law was passed in 2003, but its implementation stalled. Amendments in 2014 aimed to put it into effect, without success: while courts were responsive, government departments declined access requests, and many Soviet-era files remained classified. In the first quarter of 2026, the Committee to Protect Freedom of Expression (CPFE) reported that state bodies routinely used the law's 30-day response period instead of the standard five-day deadline, delaying coverage of public-interest issues. Other relevant laws for the media sector include the Law on Advertising and the Law on Freedom of Information. The latter established the right to access public information and detailed the lawful limitations to such right (state, official, bank or trade secrets; privacy rights; pre-investigation data).

There is no law exempting journalists from testimony or protecting their sources in Armenia.

In June 2014, a Yerevan court ruled against Hraparak and iLur.am, and in favour of Armenia's Special Investigation Service, establishing that publishing information on an ongoing investigation without prior authorization is a criminal offense. The ruling was widely criticised.

=== Legislation since 2020 ===
On 16 July 2020 the National Assembly adopted the Law on Audiovisual Media, which entered into force in August 2020 and replaced the 2000 Law on Television and Radio. Modelled on the EU Audiovisual Media Services Directive, it regulates the governance, financing and remit of the public broadcaster and the powers of the audiovisual regulator, the Commission on Television and Radio (CTR). International organisations and experts raised concerns about its compliance with European standards, and further amendments followed from 2022. On 16 April 2026 parliament adopted further amendments clarifying the rules on prohibited audiovisual content, the related sanctions, and the responsibilities of the regulator, including for content distributed by network operators.

On 24 March 2021 the National Assembly tripled the maximum civil penalties for insult and defamation, to 3 million and 6 million drams respectively. Freedom House said the change threatened the financial viability of media outlets. In July 2021 parliament also made "grave insult" of persons engaged in public activities a criminal offence. Hundreds of criminal cases were opened under the provision before it was dropped from the new Criminal Code that took effect on 1 July 2022.

In December 2021 parliament adopted amendments to the Law on Mass Media and the Code on Administrative Offences that hold media outlets responsible for publishing insult or defamation attributed to unidentified sources.

=== Status and self-regulation of journalists ===
There is no specific Press Council in Armenia. Complaints against journalists and media outlets are handled by the courts.

== Media outlets ==
As of 2015, television was the main medium in Armenia, and most channels were controlled by or friendly to the government, as broadcast media require a license. The print sector was small and declining, while online media were growing. Russian-language media are widely available. Public media outlets received preferential treatment from the authorities, while private media were not financially sustainable and relied heavily on their owners and sponsors, limiting editorial independence. Observers of the June 2026 parliamentary elections described the media environment as pluralistic but polarised, finding that biased coverage and divisive online campaigning limited voters' access to impartial information.

=== News agencies ===
There are 9 news agencies in Armenia as of 2026. Armenpress is the oldest agency, originally called Armenian Telegraph Agency, and was founded in 1918. In 1991, two private news agencies - Snark and Noyan Tapan - began operations, providing breaking news that was free from the stereotypes of Soviet journalism. In 2001, Snark was tranformed into Arminfo news agency as the base. The most popular news agencies include EVN report, Hetq, News.am, PanARMENIAN.net, and Civilnet.

=== Print media ===
In 2009, Armenia had 747 registered newspapers and 328 magazines. Most major publications were politically affiliated, which limited their editorial independence, and daily circulation was low, between 1,500 and 3,000 copies.

The most popular daily newspapers include the liberal Aravot (Morning), Haykakan zhamanak (Armenian Times), Hayastani Hanrapetutyun (Republic of Armenia) – the official gazette of the government, published since 1990 – and Azg (Nation). Periodicals published in Russian are also very popular in Armenia and include the newspaper Golos Armenii (Voice of Armenia), Novoe Vremya (New Time) and Respublika Armenia (Republic of Armenia). Chorrord ishghanutyun (Fourth Power) is considered an opposition newspaper.

Because of the large Armenian diaspora, many Armenian newspapers are published abroad, such as the Istanbul daily Jamanak. English-language publications include Noyan Tapan.

During the protests following the 2008 Armenian presidential election, the government declared a 20-day state of emergency, during which most newspapers had to suspend publication or report only official news.

=== Radio broadcasting ===
As of 2008, Armenia had 9 AM stations, 17 FM stations and one shortwave station, and approximately 850,000 radios. The main transmission network operator is the Television and Radio Broadcasting Network of Armenia (TRBNA).

The Public Radio of Armenia is the national public radio channel. As of 2009, Armenia had dozens of private radio stations, including Radio Ardzaganq, Radio Jazz, Radio Avrora, Radio Van, Nor (New) Radio, Radio Hay, City FM, AvtoRadio but they cover only part of the country. They play different kinds of music: traditional music on Radio Hay FM 104.1 MHz, European, American and Russian pop music on Radio Van FM 103.0 MHz, Radio Ardzaganq FM 103.5 MHz and Radio Avrora FM 100.6 MHz, and classical music on Vem Radio FM 101.6 MHz. Most broadcast in Armenian or Russian; FM 102.4 broadcast in French, and some stations had programmes in German. Azatutyun (RFE/RL) broadcast news and analysis three times a day on the frequencies of Radio Yerevan FM 102.0.

=== Television broadcasting ===
Public television channels include Armenia 1 that began transmissions in 1956. According to the Television Association Committee of Armenia, TV penetration was 80% in 2011. TV remains the main source of information for Armenian citizens.

As of 2009, Armenia had 48 private television stations alongside 2 public networks (National 1 (H1) and Ararat); private TV channels include Shant TV, Armenia, AR, Yerkir Media, Hayrenik (for children), H2 and Dar21. Major Russian channels (ORT and RTR with full retransmission, as well as Kultura and Mir) are widely available throughout the country; CNN (in English) and Euronews (in Russian) are the only foreign broadcasters covering Yerevan. Cable TV has a limited range, while satellite TV is widespread in Yerevan. Three Armenian satellite channels – H1, Shant and Armenia – cater to Armenian communities in Europe and North America. In the year 2008 TRBNA upgraded the main circuit to digital distribution system based on DVB-IP and MPEG2 standards.

TV channels lacked economic sustainability, and financial needs limited their editorial independence; many were sponsored by political parties for propaganda purposes.

Television outlets needed licenses from the National Commission on Television and Radio (NCTR), which was considered highly politicised. The 2020 Law on Audiovisual Media introduced licensing competitions for slots in the public multiplex, in which the Public Television of Armenia has a place without competition. As of the early 2010s, other than the Gyumri-based GALA TV, virtually all Armenian TV stations, including the Yerevan-based national networks, are controlled by or loyal to the government. The only major private network that regularly aired criticism of the government (A1+) was controversially forced off the air in 2002, damaging pluralism in the Armenian media landscape and the country's international reputation. A1+ continued working as an internet-based news agency. Gala faced closure in 2015, being denied a digital TV license during the digitalisation switchover process.

In 2010, the Armenian government passed a set of controversial amendments to Armenian law on broadcasting that enables government regulators to grant or revoke licenses without explanation, as well as impose programming restrictions that would confine some stations to narrow themes such as culture, education, and sports. The Committee to Protect Journalists suggested that these amendments are primarily aimed at keeping the independent TV station A1+ off the air. It also pointed out that GALA TV, another, functioning independent broadcaster based in Gyumri, will be taken off the air in 2015 because of the amendments. Both A1+ and GALA TV failed to win new licenses in supposedly competitive tenders administered by the National Commission on Television and Radio in late 2010. The European Court of Human Rights ruled in 2008 that A1+'s licence was improperly revoked, but as of 2014 the station had not been given a licence and only broadcast a weekday news programme on Armnews frequencies.

=== Cinema ===
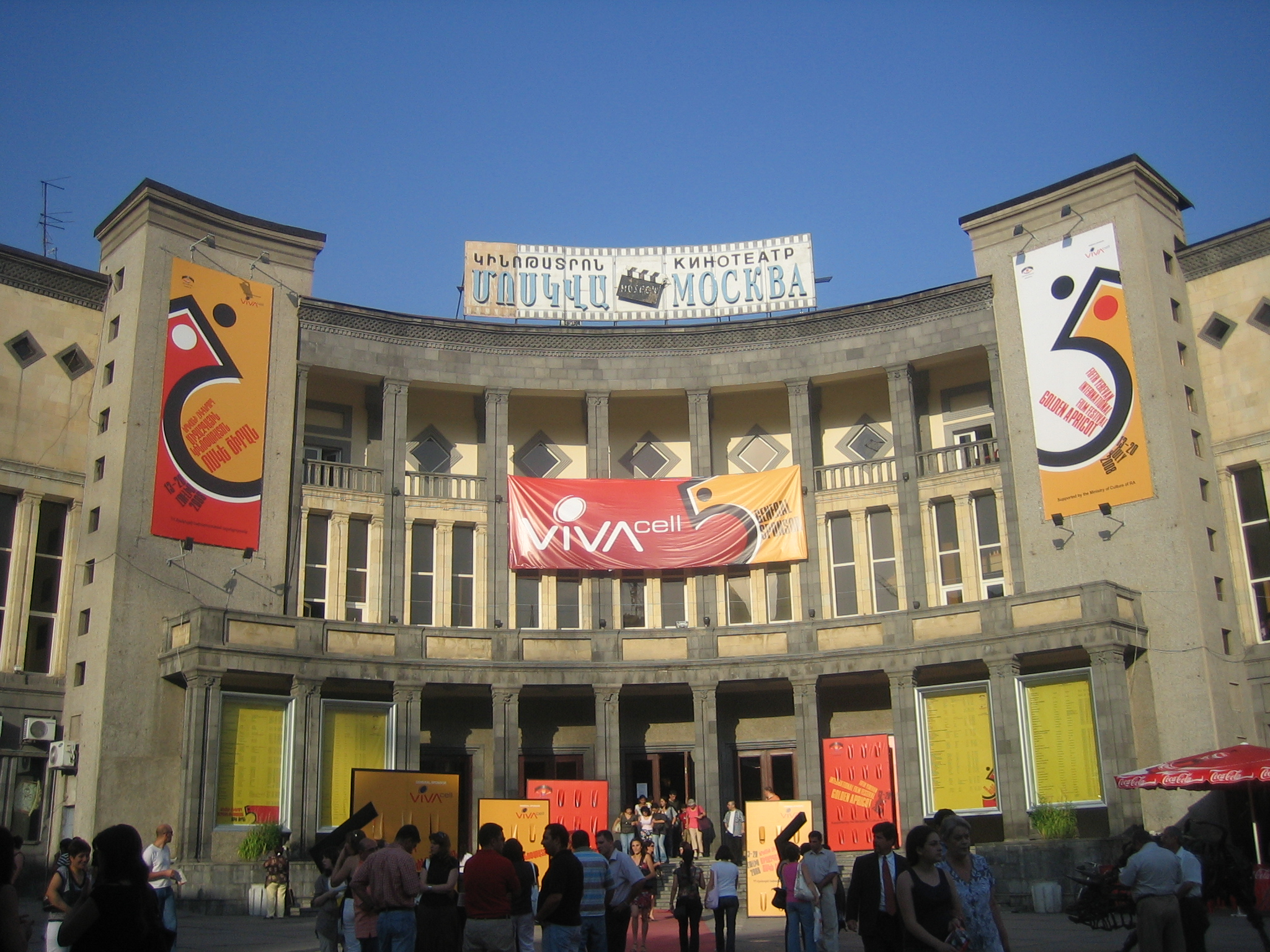
Moscow Cinema in Yerevan

==== History ====
The earliest filming in Armenia dates to 1907, when the funeral of Mkrtich Khrimian, Catholicos of All Armenians from 1893 to 1907, was filmed. During World War I, newsreel operators filmed scenes on the Caucasian Front and the evacuation of Armenians to Russia.

Soviet Armenia (1924) was the first Armenian documentary film, directed by several directors, ncluding Sergei Parajanov. In 1918, director I. N. Perestiani, working with a script by V. K. Papazyan and Ts. Lakka, produced the first screen adaptation of Alexander Shirvanzade’s novel Namus (1926) at the A. A. Khanzhonkov film studio (the film was released under the title Bound by an Oath). It was the first Armenian silent black and white film, describing the ill fate of two lovers, who were engaged by their families to each other since childhood, but because of violations of namus (a tradition of honor), the girl was married by her father. The film was notable for its innovative editing and wonderful acting (Hrachya Nersisyan, Asmik, Hovhannes Abelyan, Nina Manucharyan, and others). In 1928, director Patvakan Barkhudaryan made his debut. Together with Mikhail Gelovani, he directed the film "Evil Spirit" (based on Shirvanzade’s novel The Possessed), which was directed against the authority of adat (traditional customary law). This film continued the realistic traditions established in the earlier film Namus. In 1926, director Amo Bek-Nazarov made a silent, black-and-white feature film titled Shor and Shorshor, based on a short story by a writer M. Bagratuni; the film satirizes idlers in the countryside. It is also known by another name - Armenian Pat and Patachon. In 1969, Sergei Parajanov created The Color of Pomegranates. The emergence and development of the national cinema in Armenia were also because of the close ties with other professionals in the film industries of other Soviet republics. Armenian filmmakers creatively embraced the innovative aspirations of Sergei Eisenstein, Vsevolod Pudovkin, and Alexander Dovzhenko, as well as their explorations into a revolutionary path for the development of cinematic art.

Animated films began to be produced in Armenia in 1938. At the Yerevan Film Studio, director L. K. Atamanov created the animated film The Dog and the Cat (based on a work by H. Tumanyan, 1938) and, in 1941, The Priest and the Goat (based on an Armenian folk tale). After 1947, the production of animated films ceased, only to resume in the 1960s. Notable works from this period include the animated films A Drop of Honey (1968, artist and director V. G. Podpomogov), The Bride of the Sun (artist and director S. Kh. Andrikanyan), and Puy-Puy the Little Mouse (director R. P. Babayan) - the latter two from 1969.

Director Henrik Malyan made several of the best-known films of the Soviet period, including The Triangle (1967), We and Our Mountains (1970), based on a work by Hrant Matevosyan, and Nahapet (1977), a symbolic portrayal of the Armenian people's revival after the Armenian genocide. In 1969 Sergei Parajanov made The Color of Pomegranates. From 1970, Armenfilm also regularly produced films commissioned for television.

==== Festivals and organisations ====
The National Cinema Center of Armenia (NCCA), founded in 2006, is the state body for cinema. It supports Armenian film production, including features, animation and short films, and provides state funding to young filmmakers. They have an official website with all informations and programs they provide.

The Golden Apricot Yerevan International Film Festival (GAIFF), established in 2004, is held in Yerevan every July. ReAnimania International Animation Film & Comics Art Festival was founded by cartoonist, painter and animator Kassouny Vrej in 2008. It is the largest animation and comics festival in the region, bridging East and West through animated arts and welcoming filmmakers from over 101 countries. In June, the One Shot International Short Film Festival takes place in Yerevan for independent filmmakers and fans of short formats. Late August brings the Fresco International Film Festival, a free event in Yerevan and regions geared toward general audiences interested in social and humanitarian themes. November and December feature two specialized Yerevan festivals: the Rolan International Film Festival, which is strictly for children and teenagers, and the KIN International Women's Film Festival, which is dedicated exclusively to female directors and audiences interested in gender issues.

The Armenian Association of Film Critics and Cinema Journalists (AAFCCJ) is a non-governmental organisation of film critics and journalists. The House of Cinema in Yerevan, built in 1974, belongs to the Union of Film Professionals of Armenia, successor to the Union of Filmmakers of Armenia founded in 1953; its Great Hall, with 500 seats, is the largest cinema hall in Armenia.

The main cinemas in Yerevan include the Moscow Cinema, Cinema Star and KinoPark; others include the Nairi Cinema and Kino Hayastan.

=== Telecommunications ===
As of 2026, there are 4.34 million active mobile network subscribers in Armenia, which amounts to 148 percent of the total population. There are 2.44 million internet users in Armenia, with an internet penetration rate of 83.4 percent.

Armenia has three mobile network operators. Viva Armenia changed its company name from Viva-MTS in 2024. Team Telecom Armenia took over the Beeline business in Armenia, and Ucom entered the mobile market by buying Orange Armenia in 2015. All three offer mobile internet.

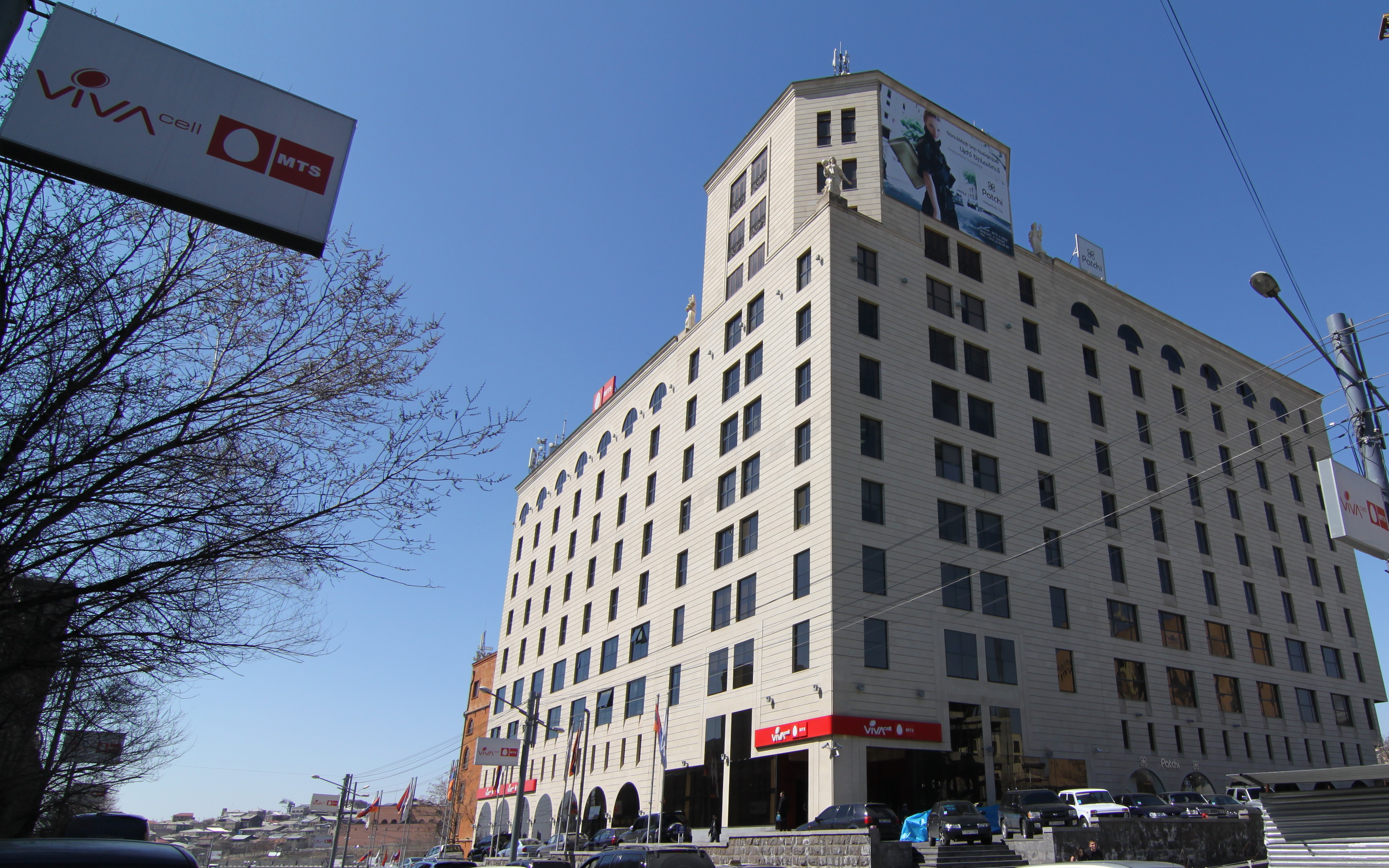
Headquarters of Viva Armenia (formerly VivaCell-MTS) in Yerevan

=== Internet ===
At the start of 2024 there were 2.14 million internet users in Armenia, an internet penetration rate of 77 percent, and 1.55 million social media user identities. For comparison, penetration was 46% in 2014. Armenia's country code top-level domain is .am, which is also used by AM radio stations and for domain hacks. Public wi-fi access points in parks and cafés in Yerevan have contributed to its growth.

Armentel's (the national communications company's) only fiber optic connection to the Internet enters Armenia through Georgia (via Marneuli) and then connects to the rest of the Internet via an undersea fiber-optic cable in the Black Sea. Armenia is connected to the Trans-Asia-Europe fiber-optic cable system via Georgia, which runs along the railroad from Poti to Tbilisi to the Armenian border near Marneuli. At Poti, the TAE cable connects to the undersea Georgia-Russia system KAFOS which then connects to the Black Sea Fiber Optic Cable System. The BSFOCS is co-owned by Armentel.

In the 2000s, dial-up was a major way of connecting to the Internet because other connections were very expensive, until mobile operators began selling portable USB modems. One hour of dial-up access cost about 68 US cents, including the phone line charge.

As of March 2010, there were an estimated 100,000 broadband subscribers in Armenia. At the time, DSL connectivity was offered by Beeline, Cornet, Arminco and others.

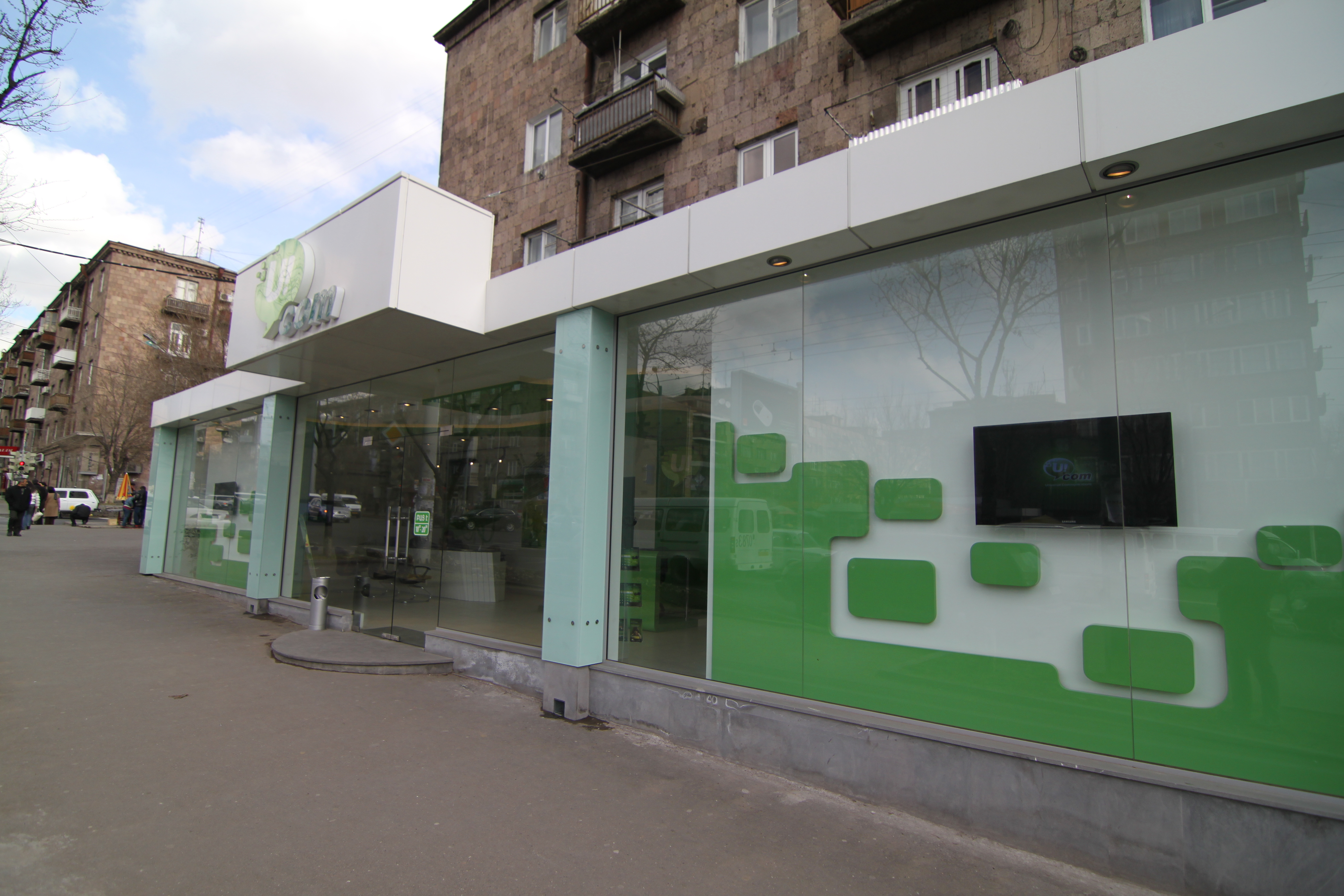
A Ucom service store in Yerevan's Arabkir district

- Cornet launched a WiMAX network in Yerevan and the 18 largest cities of Armenia, using the 802.16e protocol in the 3.6–3.8 GHz range with speeds of up to 27 Mbit/s.
- Armenian ISP Icon Communications selected Alcatel-Lucent to design, deploy and maintain a commercial WiMAX 802.16e-2005 (Rev-e) network in Armenia.
- Ucom built the first fibre-to-the-home (FTTH) network in Armenia, offering internet, IPTV and digital phone services.

As of 2009, according to the local monitoring site Circle.am, popular news sites in Armenia included Hetq online, A1+ online, PanArmenian Network, News.am, Armenia Now, Armenia Today, Panorama.am, and Tert.am.

== Media organisations ==
=== Trade unions ===
Armenia's constitution recognises the right to form and join trade unions, with some restrictions for members of the armed forces or police. The main trade union is the Confederation of Trade Unions of Armenia (CTUA).

=== Media agencies ===
Media organisations in Armenia include the Union of Journalists of Armenia, the Yerevan Press Club (YPC), the Association of Investigative Journalists (HETQ), and Media Initiatives Center.

NGOs active in the media field include the Committee to Protect Freedom of Expression (CPFE), which publishes regular reports on violations of journalists' rights.

=== Regulatory authorities ===
The audiovisual regulator is the Commission on Television and Radio (CTR), an independent regulatory state body established under the 2020 Law on Audiovisual Media. It replaced the National Commission on Television and Radio (NCTR), whose eight members were appointed for six-year terms, half by the President and half by Parliament; the NCTR's licensing system was criticised for hindering media freedom and diversity. Print and online media do not require licenses.

== Censorship and media freedom ==
While the media has a degree of independence, freedom of the press in Armenia is limited. Before 2018, some independent channels, such as A1+, Noyan Tapan and the Russian channel NTV, had their frequencies taken away by the government. Journalists covering a demonstration against President Robert Kocharyan were attacked when police intervened to detain the protestors in 2005.

In January 2011, the Committee to Protect Journalists – international media watchdog – criticized the Armenian government for maintaining a tight grip on the country's broadcast media and accused them of routinely harassing local journalists challenging them. According to the CPJ report, new amendments to Armenian broadcasting law in 2010 positioned President Sarkisian "to maintain control over the country's docile television and radio stations, most of which were owned by pro-government politicians and businessmen." The report also claims that the Armenian police officers "routinely harassed, assaulted, and arrested journalists" in 2010. "Prosecutors regularly colluded in this practice by failing to investigate police officers, even filing charges on occasion against journalists who protested abuses, CPJ research showed."

Following the 2008 Armenian presidential election protests, President Kocharyan controversially declared a 20-day State of Emergency on 1 March, and used it to ban all public gatherings and censor all media (both Internet and in print) to include only information sponsored by the state. Also, the authorities closed several opposition newspapers along with their websites, including A1+ and Haykakan Zhamanak. Furthermore, the government blocked access to the YouTube website which contained videos from the 1 March protest and late-night clashes with police that showed special forces firing automatic weapons directly into the crowd. Radio broadcasts and website access to Armenia Liberty, the Armenian service of Radio Free Europe/Radio Liberty, were also blocked.

=== Since 2018 ===
On 27 September 2020, at the start of the Second Nagorno-Karabakh War, the government declared martial law. A government decree banned the publication of anything other than official information about the conflict in the media and on social media, and on 8 October the rules were tightened to prohibit publications criticising or questioning the actions of officials enforcing martial law. Penalties were increased by law and 13 media outlets were fined; the CPFE described 2020 as the most difficult year for Armenian journalists since it began monitoring. After the war, in February 2021, the National Security Service announced that journalists needed its permission to work in border areas. The 2021 increase in defamation penalties and the temporary criminalisation of "grave insult" (see above) were also criticised by press freedom groups.

In its 2026 index, RSF said Armenia's media landscape was diverse but deeply polarised, and that despite the decriminalisation of defamation and laws on media ownership transparency, the legal framework did not adequately protect press freedom. In the first quarter of 2026 the CPFE recorded 30 violations of the rights of media workers and 14 new lawsuits against media and journalists, all for defamation or insult.

=== Attacks and threats against journalists ===
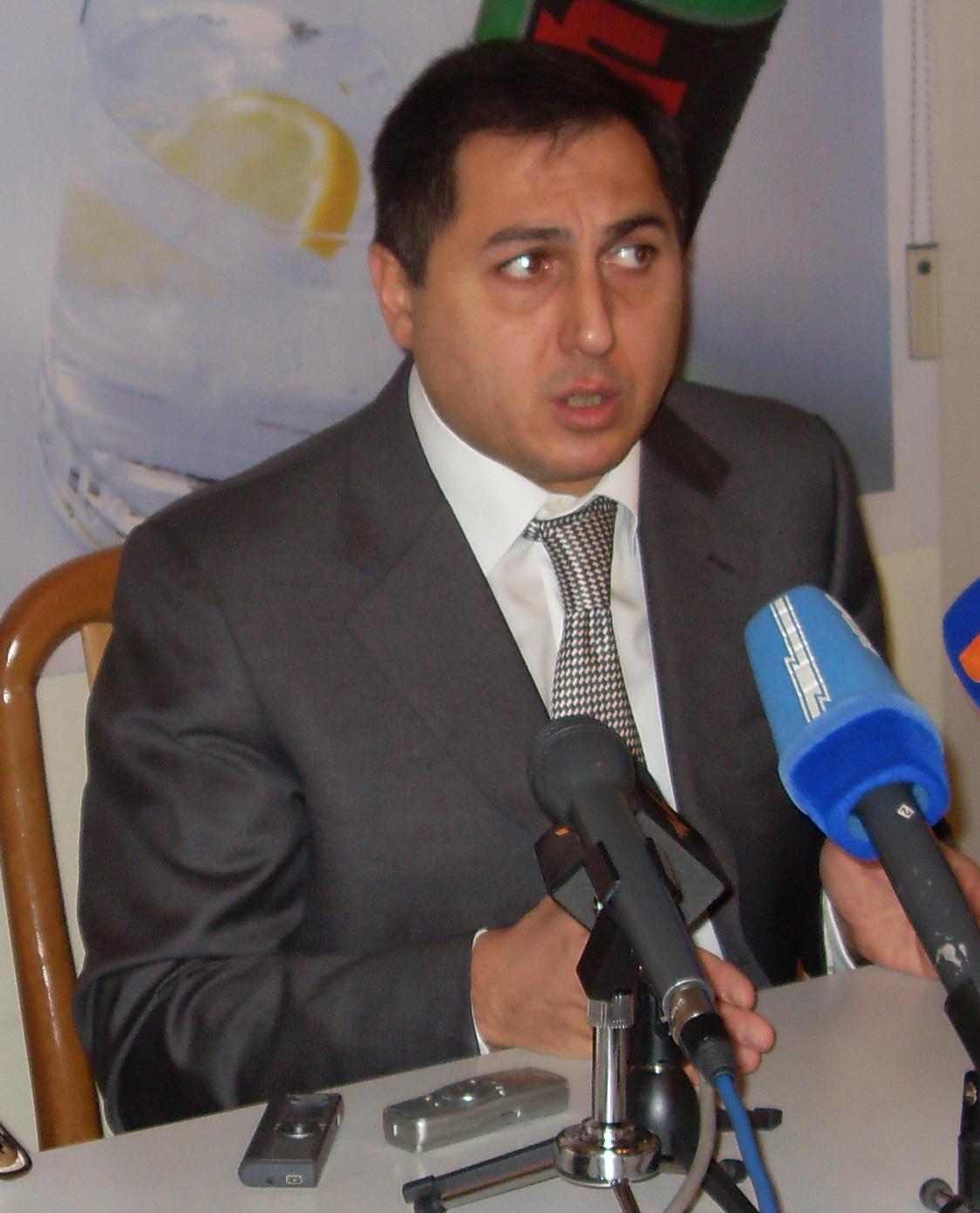
Armen Harutyunyan, Human Rights Defender (ombudsman) of Armenia (2006–2012)

Frequent attacks on journalists from independent media have been a serious threat to press freedom in Armenia. The number of assaults declined in the early 2010s, but the physical safety of journalists remained at risk. Nine attacks were reported in 2014 by the Committee to Protect Freedom of Expression (they were 10 in 2013 and 4 in 2012).

- On 17 November 2008 Edik Baghdasaryan, Armenia's most prominent investigative journalist and editor of Hetq, was violently attacked and sustained a severe head injury for which he had to be hospitalized. The attack was likely connected to his reporting.
- In 2009, unresolved cases of violence against journalists included those of Lusine Barseghyan from the opposition newspaper Haykakan Zhamanak; Hrach Melkumyan, the acting Chief of Radio Free Europe/Radio Liberty's Yerevan bureau; and Edik Baghdasaryan, the Chairman of the Investigative Journalists' Association.
- On 30 April 2009 Argishti Kiviryan, a coordinator of the ARMENIA Today news agency (a paper known for its opposition stance), was severely beaten on his way home from work in Yerevan. Three unknown individuals reportedly assailed and severely beat Kiviryan causing him serious head and face injuries. His condition was reported as "serious but stable" after he was taken to the Erebuni medical center. The Human Rights Defender of Armenia, Armen Harutyunyan, condemned the act and, noting that almost all cases of violence against the journalists taken part in the past have not been disclosed, called upon the police to investigate and disclose his assailants.
- Several journalists were attacked during the campaign for the Armenian presidential election, 2013, some of them having their equipment damaged or seized. Nobody was prosecuted by the police, due to "lack of evidence".
- In December 2013, Vardan Minasyan, a journalist with the newspaper Hraparak, was detained and assaulted by police officers while covering a public demonstration in Yerevan.
- In February 2014, Ani and Sarkis Gevorkyan, journalists with Chorrord Ishkhanutyun and iLur.am were assaulted and later detained by the police during an opposition demonstration. The case, raised with the Armenian authorities by the OSCE RFoM, was dropped. Gevorkyan's later appeal was dismissed.
- The A1+ journalist Marine Khachatryan suffered an attack in September 2014, but notwithstanding the call by the OSCE RFoM the Armenian Special Investigative Service refused to open a criminal case.
- In September 2014 a Haykakan Zhamanak journalist had her recorder and camera seized by the Head of the Armenian diaspora in Kazakhstan after questioning at a public event in Yerevan. The official then ordered his bodyguards to remove her from the premises.
- In June 2015 journalists from different media outlets (including Radio Azatutyun (RFE/RL), Hetq.am, Gala TV, Haykakan Zhamanak, News.am, PanArmenian.net, Epress.am, 1in.am, and ArmTimes.com) suffered physical attacks, verbal abuse and mistreatment by the police while covering public demonstrations in Yerevan. Some of them had their equipment seized or damaged.
- At least three journalists were obstructed or assaulted, in the period leading to the Armenian constitutional referendum, 2015.

=== Political interferences ===
The Committee to Protect Freedom of Expression (CPFE) reported 43 cases of pressure on media workers in 2014 (57 in 2013). As of 2015, the government controlled the main broadcast media and, as a result, self-censorship was widespread.

- In 2007 the television station Gala broadcast a speech by an opposition presidential candidate. The government then asked the station to change its transmitter, and it did not receive a new digital licence.
- In May 2015 Armenia's prosecutor-general warned journalists that reporting on ongoing investigations without prior authorization would constitute a crime.
- In July 2015 two media outlets, the Hraparak newspaper and Ilur.am news portal, were ordered by Armenian courts to disclose their confidential sources. Journalists were later charged for failing to comply with a court order. The situation was denounced by the OSCE RFoM.
- On 13 November 2025, National Security Service officers detained Vazgen Saghatelyan and Narek Samsonyan, hosts of the pro-opposition Imnemnimi podcast on the Antifake.am website, after a complaint by Parliament Speaker Alen Simonyan over insults directed at him on air. They were charged with hooliganism and placed in pre-trial detention, and the outlet's equipment was seized. As a result, Armenia was listed for the first time by the Council of Europe's Platform for the Safety of Journalists among states holding media actors in detention.

=== Civil defamation lawsuits ===
Criminal liability for defamation was eliminated in 2010. In 2011 the Constitutional Court ruled that "critical assessment of facts" and "evaluation judgments" cannot be charged for defamation.

Civil defamation suits have been used by politicians and businesspeople to put pressure on the media, as the high fines involved were considered disproportionate by the OSCE RFoM. Almost 30 lawsuits were counted between May 2010 and November 2011. The CPFE counted 17 civil defamation lawsuits against media workers in 2014. Maximum penalties were tripled in 2021, and RSF attributed part of Armenia's fall in its 2026 index to a rise in abusive defamation lawsuits.

In 2011 a lawyer sued the Hraparak newspaper for €34,000 in damages for allegedly slanderous readers’ comments. A Yerevan court ordered the seizure of the newspaper's properties as an interim measure pending the final decision. The OSCE RFoM denounced the judgement, and recalled that "compensation... should be proportional to actual damages and should not lead to the closure of a news outlet".

=== Internet censorship and surveillance ===
Armenia is listed as engaged in substantial filtering in the political area and selective filtering in the social, conflict/security, and Internet tools areas by the OpenNet Initiative (ONI) in November 2010.

According to the ONI in 2010, access to the Internet in Armenia was largely unrestricted, although evidence of more sophisticated filtering was growing, and in times of political unrest the government had restricted the Internet to curb protests. According to Article 11 of the Law of the Republic of Armenia on Police, law enforcement has the right to block content to prevent criminal activity.

Part of Armenia's internet traffic passes through Russian providers, occasionally resulting in censorship by Russian ISPs. In 2012 Russian authorities blocked kavkazcenter.com, resulting in it being blocked in Armenia. In 2014 five other websites were blocked due to filtering by the Russian telecommunications regulator Roskomnadzor. ISPs claimed the blocks were due to technical error and were removed.

In September 2026, Armenia's State Revenue Committee (SRC) said that amendments to the law "On Regulation of Gaming Activities" would change how the country blocks online gambling and lottery websites run by companies without an Armenian license. The new rules are due to take effect on 8 February 2027. Internet service providers will have to block websites on a list approved by the head of the gambling regulator, based on findings from an interdepartmental commission. The regulator will also send the list to the Central Bank of Armenia, which can then restrict payments made through those websites. The law also bans advertising for these websites, both in Armenia and on internet content accessible from the country. The SRC said the changes do not restrict legal gambling and are meant to protect the licensed market and keep competition fair.

== Media ownership ==
=== Transparency ===
Transparency of media ownership refers to the public availability of accurate, comprehensive and up-to-date information about media ownership structures. A legal regime guaranteeing transparency of media ownership makes possible for the public as well as for media authorities to find out who effectively owns, controls and influences the media as well as media influence on political parties or state bodies.

Transparency of media ownership in Armenia was originally regulated by the 2003 Law on Mass Media, which obliged print media to publish data on their ownership and management but did not cover online media.

The law, amended in June 2010, stipulates that the following entities cannot be founders of private television and radio broadcasting companies: state and local public agencies, member of the Council of the Public Television and Radio Company, members of the National Commission for Television and Radio (NCTR), political parties, religious organisations, the president, members of the government, members of the National Assembly and judges, and persons "affiliated with them", as defined in the amended law.

As of 2013, information about beneficial ownership was not accessible to the public.

In 2015 Liana Sayadyan, head of the Armenian Section of the Association of European Journalists proposed the reform of the law: the proposed amendment would have extended the law to online media, obliging them to disclose the same ownership information as print media. Later reforms strengthened these rules: a Council of Europe study found that Armenia's rules on media ownership transparency were particularly strong, and RSF noted in 2026 that Armenia had enacted laws ensuring transparency of media ownership.

=== Concentration and pluralism ===
Armenia has many and diverse media outlets and laws against concentration, but these laws have been bypassed and concentration remains a problem. The switch from analog to digital broadcasting was particularly damaging for media pluralism.

==== Legal framework ====
Amendments to the broadcast law adopted in June 2010 prohibited ownership of more than one channel in the same broadcasting area. Since 2020, ownership restrictions have been set by the Law on Audiovisual Media.

The 2010 law also limited the broadcast of programmes produced abroad:

... broadcasts of domestically produced programmes by television-radio companies on one television (radio) channel may not be less than 55 per cent of the overall monthly airtime ...

— Art. 8, broadcasting statute

==== Practice ====
According to a 2015 report by the local chapter of Transparency International, media in Armenia were diverse, but television stations were controlled by the state or wealthy businesspeople. In practice the law was not fully respected: as of 2012, for example, Panarmenian Media Group (formerly CS Media) owned Armenia TV, Armnews, ATV and TV5.

It has often been difficult to establish who really owns the media; owners are frequently politicians or well-known businesspeople, often affiliated with political groups, who influence editorial policy. Most experts did not consider the media to be run as businesses in their own right. Concentration limits the circulation of information and ideas.

Public media

The state had a monopoly on the media market until the early 2000s. As of 2014, public television owned four channels, one of which was a satellite channel. According to an IREX report as of 2016 they had acted consistently as an obedient tool of the authorities. During the 2026 election campaign, some interlocutors told ODIHR observers that they perceived the public broadcaster as supportive of the government.

Public radio consisted of four radio stations as of 2014. IREX considered it a model public media outlet with balanced, impartial coverage and a wide range of views, though with a limited audience.

Soviet-era wired radio was shut down in 2014, particularly affecting older people who relied on it.

Advertising

Commercial advertising is prohibited on the public television. For 12 years (2002–2014) advertising of strong alcoholic beverages was prohibited on radio and TV.

The economic downturn of the late 2000s and early 2010s slowed the development of the media and advertising industry in Armenia; the fall in commercial advertising was partly offset by political advertising.

Passage from analog to digital broadcasting

The broadcast law has been criticized by Dunja Mijatovic, OSCE Representative on Freedom of the Media, for not promoting broadcast pluralism in the digital era. Passage from analog to digital broadcasting was originally scheduled for completion in 2015, but doubts were expressed that the deadline could be respected.

The transition allowed only one digital broadcasting license for each of the 10 provinces. This was criticized by independent experts because it would force dozens of regional stations to close, thus reducing the plurality of regional media.

Moreover, the law did not provide for private regional Multiplex, allowing only national ones, that require large investments.

Lobbying by media and media support organisations was temporarily successful: in December 2015 the parliament approved a bill allowing regional stations to continue analog broadcasting within their communities. Officials cited as a reason the need to provide digital television adapters to low-income households.

Experts did not consider this a viable long-term solution. The analog switch-off was postponed more than once until 26 October 2016, and 11 regional TV companies were forced to close.

== See also ==
- Censorship in Armenia
- Cinema of Armenia
- Human rights in Armenia
- Internet in Armenia
- List of newspapers in Armenia
- Media freedom in Armenia
- Television in Armenia
- Transparency of media ownership in Europe
