= 1in.am =

Armenian news website

1in.am Armenian News and Analyses
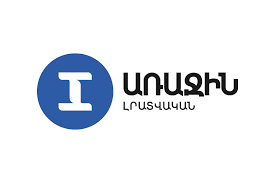
- Logo of 1in.am, written First Informative in Armenian

- Front page Home page of 1in.am from 8 August 2012
- Website type: Online newspaper
- Available in: Armenian; English; Russian
- Website: en.1in.am
- Current status: Active

1in.am Armenian News and Analyses (Armenian: Առաջին լրատվական Arajin Lratvakan, meaning "First informative"), or simply 1in.am, is an Armenian website with hosting based in New York.

== About ==
1in.am is an online newspaper, that covers local and world news and information. It has divisions for Armenia, Caucasus, world, press, business and sports (last two in Armenian only) related news. 1in.am is available in three languages, Armenian, Russian and English. As of January 2013 it is the 19th most visited website in Armenia and has about 38,000 visitors daily.

== See also ==
- Mass media in Armenia
