= ArmCosmos =

Armenian space agency

- Հայկական տիեզերական գործակալություն

Agency overview
- Formed: 31 May 2013; 13 years ago
- Jurisdiction: Armenia
- Headquarters: Yerevan, Armenia
- Parent department: Ministry of Transport and Communication

ArmCosmos, commonly known as the Armenian Space Agency (Armenian: Հայկական տիեզերական գործակալություն), is an Armenian private agency responsible for the development of Armenia's commercial space industry, coordinating domestic activities, identifying opportunities and facilitating international space engagement, on behalf of the Government of Armenia. Its headquarters are located in Yerevan, Armenia.

== History ==
In 2013, Gagik Grigorian, head of the Ministry of Transport and Communication announced the creation of ArmCosmos, a company to facilitate launching Armenia's first commercial satellite, named ArmSat, into Earth's orbit.

The government first announced plans to launch an Armenian satellite in April 2012 when senior officials from Russia's Federal Space Agency, also known as Roscosmos, visited Yerevan and met with Prime Minister Tigran Sargsyan. A government statement announced that the two sides expressed readiness “to take necessary measures to put the project into practice.”

Currently, six of the 15 Post-Soviet republics have launched their own satellites since the collapse of the Soviet Union in 1991.

== Budget ==
The initial cost for Armenia's space program was US$250 million, with part of the sum to come from private investors, as announced by government officials.

== Goals ==
Armenia currently has the right for two orbital positions for telecom satellites in the Geostationary orbit allocated to Armenia. Since 2013, ArmCosmos has been conducting negotiations with the UN's International Telecommunication Union (ITU) to plan for the prospective launch of Armenia's first satellite. Once negotiations are completed with the ITU, talks will be conducted with respect to the designing and construction of the satellite.

== Cooperation ==
Artistic rendition of the ArmCosmos satellite, ArmSat.

Armenia is a member of the United Nations Committee on the Peaceful Uses of Outer Space, the International Telecommunications Satellite Organization, the European Telecommunications Satellite Organization, and has ratified the Convention Relating to the Distribution of Programme-Carrying Signals Transmitted by Satellite.

In July 2013, Armenian Transport Minister Gagik Beglaryan, visited Canada and met with the president of the Canadian Space Agency, Gilles Leclerc, and senior official from the Canadian Export Development Agency, John Miller, to discuss the possibility of Canadian participation in Armenia's space program. Beglaryan also met with representatives from MacDonald, Dettwiler and Associates Ltd. (MDA), a Canadian aerospace technology company. MDA President Mag Iskander advised Beglaryan that the MDA will help Armenia launch its first communications satellite.

In September 2013, Armenian government officials met with German Ambassador Rainer Morel. The Ambassador stated that, "We are ready to cooperate not only in communications but also other fields related with the project" and expressed hope that German companies will also show interest in the satellite program.

In 2014, China announced its interest in developing the ArmSat satellite. Transport Minister Gagik Beglaryan met with representatives of the China Great Wall Industry Corporation and the China Academy of Space Technology. The vice president of the China Great Wall Industry Corporation, Zhao Chun Chao, stated that the Chinese side is ready to engage in the design of ArmSat, construction, launching and servicing, as well as training of Armenian specialists.

The American University of Armenia announced its interest in the program and launched the Armenian Student Aerospace Team (ArmSat) student club. The ArmSat student club is working on developing both hardware and software systems.

In 2017, India announced its intentions to build an Earth observation satellite for Armenia, as well as train Armenian scientists in the use of the system and handling and interpreting its data. An agreement was finalized following former Indian Vice-President Hamid Ansari's meeting with former President of Armenia Serzh Sargsyan.

In October 2019, government ministers from Armenia and Georgia met to discuss a range of economic and technical cooperation proposals, among them satellite communications. Both Caucasus countries acknowledged that there is “untapped potential” and pledged to collaborate on ambitious projects.

On 12 June 2024, Armenia signed the Artemis Accords.

=== Cooperation with the Eurasian Economic Union ===
The Eurasian Economic Union announced plans to create a joint remote earth sensing system by integrating space and ground-based capabilities of its member states, to include Russia, Kyrgyzstan, Armenia, Belarus and Kazakhstan. The project involves the creation of a commercial company that will integrate both space and ground-based systems and provide satellite imaging to global customers by 2019.

=== Cooperation with the European Space Agency ===
Armenia also cooperates and participates in certain programs of the European Space Agency (ESA). In 2016, Armenia joined the ESA's Earth Observation for Eastern Partnership initiative. This move brought new perspectives to develop cooperation opportunities between the ESA and the EU's Eastern Partnership countries. The project aims to achieve an increase in the uptake of satellite-based environmental information and promotes regional cooperation and knowledge exchange. The project is further endorsed by the World Bank and the European Investment Bank. Other project members include Georgia, Moldova and Poland.

== Recent developments ==
In October 2019, the Government of Armenia approved a bill on creating a national law on space activities. The bill will provide companies with tax privileges until 2030, will encourage space activities to be developed in Armenia and will enable Armenia to carry out its own space programs, including launching Armenian spacecraft and satellites into space.

On 26 March 2020, the Government of Armenia signed into law a package of space activity legislation called "Advanced Tomorrow", or ATOM, which will promote educational and economic development and will expand both state and commercial space activities.

In August 2020, the President of Armenia, Armen Sarksyan, announced that Armenia will host the sixth Starmus Festival from September 5 to 10, 2022. The event was sponsored by the President himself, as well as, the Ministry of Education and Science. The event brought together world-class scientists, artists, astronauts, and the general public to celebrate science communication and to share latest discoveries in a number of scientific fields. The main focus of the sixth Starmus Festival was on the exploration of Mars.

On 27 April 2021, the Secretary of the Security Council of Armenia, Armen Grigoryan met with the General Director of Roscosmos, Dmitry Rogozin in Moscow. The parties discussed the prospects for the development of space activities in Armenia. Rogozin praised Armenian-Russian cooperation in the field of space monitoring. He proposed to expand cooperation between Russia and Armenia in the framework of space technology, design and development. The parties also agreed to set up a space activities working group between Armenia and Russia.

On 15 June 2021, the Minister of High-Tech Industry, Hayk Chobanyan, participated in the Global Space Exploration Conference (GLEX 2021) in Saint Petersburg. He attached importance to cooperation with key players in the field and participation in international events and stated that Armenia is a country with great ambitions and potential in the field of space research. Chobanyan stressed that taking into account that space exploration is accompanied by technological progress, the Armenian government is investing in the development of this direction. “We strive to work with the world’s leading countries to use space for peaceful purposes and to engage in other global projects,” the Minister said.

On 25 May 2022, Armenia launched an observation satellite in cooperation with SpaceX. The Prime Minister of Armenia, Nikol Pashinyan stated, "On May 25, 2022, at 22:35 Yerevan time, the first satellite of Armenia was launched into orbit from the space station at Cape Canaveral, USA."

== See also ==
- List of companies of Armenia
- List of government space agencies
- Soviet space program
- Science and technology in Armenia
- Telecommunications in Armenia
