= Media freedom in Armenia =

Censorship in Armenia is generally non-existent, except in some limited incidents.

Armenia has recorded unprecedented progress in the 2022 World Press Freedom Index, improving positions by 11 points and ranking 51st on the list. Publication also confirms absence of cases of killed journalists, citizen journalists or media assistants.

== History ==
=== 1990s and before ===
The process of democratization of the Soviet Union started with the policy of Glasnost, meaning openness or freedom of speech.

1995 Constitution

In 1995, a constitutional referendum approved changes to the old Soviet-era Constitution.

In the 1995 Constitution, article 24 was dedicated to freedom of expression:

Everyone is entitled to freedom of speech, including the freedom to seek, receive, and disseminate information and ideas through any medium of information, regardless of state borders

— Art. 24, Constitution of Armenia 1995

Still, articles 44 and 45 ruled the possibility of temporary suspensions of media freedom to protect "state and public security, public order, public health and morality, and the rights, freedoms, honor, and reputation of others." There was no explicit ban of censorship.

=== 2000s ===
Freedom of information legislation was passed in 2003, and was implemented in 2015.

==== 2002 ====
In 2002, A1+ television channel was shut down by the government. After that, 17 media outlets declared that freedom of expression was not in danger in the country. This was a start of an editorial policy of self-censorship, particularly in television and radio. This means that direct censorship is less common because it is not needed.

2005 Constitution

In 2005, a constitutional referendum approved a series of changes to the Constitution. Chapter 2 of the new Constitution of Armenia is dedicated to "Fundamental Human and Civil Rights and Freedoms". Article 27 is dedicated to freedom of expression and of the press:

Everyone shall have the right to freely express his/her opinion. No one shall be forced to recede or change his/her opinion.

Everyone shall have the right to freedom of expression including freedom to search for, receive and impart information and ideas by any means of information regardless of the state frontiers.
Freedom of mass media and other means of mass information shall be guaranteed.

The state shall guarantee the existence and activities of an independent and public radio and television service offering a variety of informational, cultural and entertaining programs.

— Art. 27, Constitution of Armenia 2005

Since 2010, there are no criminal penalties for defamation, but it is still a civil wrong. Politicians, businessman, etc. often ask for huge monetary damage. Treatment of journalists in courts is not always fair, even if the Constitutional Court in 2011 ruled that media outlets cannot be held liable for “critical assessment of facts” and “evaluation judgments”.

=== Since 2010 ===
==== 2015 ====
While there was a reduction of violence against journalists there was a serious episode in June 2015. During the Electric Yerevan mass protests, police used a water cannon against demonstrators and journalists. At least 14 media operators were injured, and equipment was damaged.

==== 2024 ====
In December 2024, Armenia became a full member of the Freedom Online Coalition.

== See also ==
- Human rights in Armenia
- Internet censorship and surveillance in Europe
- Mass media in Armenia
- Open Society Foundations–Armenia
- Social issues in Armenia
