= .am =

Top-level Internet domain for Armenia

- Introduced: 26 August 1994
- TLD type: Country code top-level domain
- Status: Active
- Registry: AMNIC
- Sponsor: ISOC-AM (local chapter of Internet Society)
- Intended use: Entities connected with Armenia
- Actual use: Primarily in Armenia; some domain hack use elsewhere, e.g. Instagr.am, and some use by AM radio stations
- Registration restrictions: Some generic names reserved; registry reserves right to revoke registrations due to spam, obscenity, or other illegal or immoral activity
- Structure: Registrations permitted directly at second level
- Documents: AM TLD policy
- Dispute policies: Not available
- DNSSEC: yes
- Registry website: AMNIC

.am is the internet country code top-level domain (ccTLD) for Armenia. The Armenia Network Information Centre is managed by the Internet Society of Armenia and is headquartered in Yerevan.

== Regulation ==
The registry for .am is operated by ISOC-AM, the local chapter of the Internet Society.

Regulatory notes:

- Any person in the world can register a .am, .com.am, .net.am, .org.am domain for a fee.
- Each domain name is subject to review. Generally, each review takes about 2 or 3 working days.
- Armenian law prohibits its domain names from being used for spam, pornography, or terrorism sites.
- The AM-NIC was moved over to IPv6 address compatibility in line with the global DNS.
- Unicode compatible names will not be instituted at AM-NIC until all issues related to IPv6 are resolved.

== Usage in domain hacks ==
Domains within the .am ccTLD enjoy popularity due to the connection to AM radio (similar to the .fm and .tv ccTLDs), and the ability to form English words ending in "am" — e.g. the mobile photo sharing service Instagram uses the Armenian domain name Instagr.am. The live video streaming service Stre.am uses the TLD to form their operative keyword, "Stream". American music artist and producer will.i.am uses the domain for his website. Such unconventional usage of TLDs in domain names are called domain hacks.

== Second top-level domain ==
In 2014, a new Armenian top-level domain name was added, intended for Armenian language domain names. The TLD is .հայ ("hy"), from the ethnonym for Armenian. It launched in 2016.

== Partnerships ==
Armenia is a member of the Council of European National Top Level Domain Registries and RIPE NCC.

== See also ==
- Mass media in Armenia
- Telecommunications in Armenia
