= A1plus =

Independent Armenian media network

- Country: Armenia
- Founded: January 3, 1991; 34 years ago by Movses Mesropyan
- Motto: Listen to us, know yourself.
- Headquarters: Yerevan
- Launch date: 1991
- Dissolved: 2002 (as a TV channel)
- Official website: www.a1plus.am
- Replaced by: Cinemax Armenia

Alplus or A1+ (Armenian: Ա1+) is an independent Armenian media network. Until 2002, it had a TV channel which was closed by the government of Robert Kocharyan. Now it is present online at www.a1plus.am.

== See also ==
- Media in Armenia
- Television in Armenia
