= Irates =

Irates Իրատես
- Type: Twice a week
- Format: Tabloid
- Owner: Tesaket Ltd
- Editor: Pirouza Meliksetyan
- Founded: 2008
- Language: Armenian
- Headquarters: Yerevan, Armenia
- Website: www.irates.am

Cover of Irates de facto

Irates (in Armenian Իրատես) (stylized as de facto in Latin alphabet) is an Armenian language newspaper published by "Tesaket Ltd" in Armenia twice a week, Tuesdays and Fridays.

The first issue was published in Yerevan on 3 June 2008 under the name Iravunke de facto (in Armenian Իրավունքը դե ֆակտո) (stylized as de facto in Latin alphabet). The name was changed to Irates de facto starting July 2010. The name was later changed to Irates starting March 2016.

The tabloid-size paper is published in 12 pages on Tuesdays and 16 pages on Fridays (2 color page on Tuesdays and 4 color pages on Fridays, covering political, economical, financial, social and cultural news. The editor in chief is Pirouza Meliksetyan.

The paper has established its own press club in which every Saturday where journalists meet with a notable personality for question and answer sessions.
