= Armenpress =

Armenian news agency

- Company type: News agency
- Founded: 18 December 1918; 107 years ago
- Founder: National Council of Armenia
- Headquarters: Yerevan, Armenia
- Website: armenpress.am

Armenpress (Armenian Press; Armenian: Արմենպրես) is the oldest and the main state news agency in Armenia.

== History and profile ==
Armenpress was founded on 18 December 1918 by the government of the First Republic of Armenia as the Armenian Telegraph Agency (Հայաստանի հեռագրական գործակալություն). Simon Vratsian played a major role in the establishment of the agency. After the Sovietization of Armenia in 1920 it was renamed to Armenkavrosta, and subsequently known as Armenrosta and Armenta. It was renamed Armenpress in 1972. During the Soviet period, from 1920 to 1991, it served as the "official sanctioned source of public information", operating under direct control of the Armenian Communist Party.

Armenpress collaborates with Reuters, TASS (Russia) and Xinhua (China). It is a member of the Black Sea Association of National News Agencies.

Many neologisms coined by Armenpress have entered the Armenian language.

On 24 May 2022, Armenpress and Télam news agency signed a cooperation agreement in Buenos Aires, Argentina.

== See also ==
- Mass media in Armenia
