= Tert.am =

Armenian news website

- Website type: News website
- Available in: Armenian, English, Russian
- Founded: 2008
- Headquarters: Yerevan, Armenia
- Owner: Qaryak Media
- Founder: Arman Sahakyan
- CEO: Aram Antinyan
- Industry: Media
- Services: News
- Employees: 51 - 200
- Website: tert.am

Tert.am (Armenian: թերթ /tert/ meaning “newspaper”) is a multi-genre news site covering topics such as politics, economics, society, culture, sports, entertainment, technology,life and health in Armenia and Caucasus region, as well as international news. It was initially а media project of the Armenia-based limited liability company founded by Media Style LLC. It is headquartered in Yerevan, Armenia.The current CEO since is Aram Antinyan since 2008.The website is available in social media like Telegram, Facebook, Youtube and Linkedln.

== History and Events ==
In 2006, Arman Sahakyan founded Media Style LLC.Following the foundation after 2 year, Tert.am was launched in 2008, founded and owned by Arman Sahakyan, a late Member of Parliament for the Republican Party of Armenia (RPA).

From 2009, the website adds a Turkish language section named Zaman. In 2013, the ownership changed to the new company named Tert Am LLC founded by Seda Harutyunyan, registered as a news agency.The company's founder, Seda Harutyunyan left the company in 2014 after 1 year of the company's foundation with a limited amount of information available in public sources.

From 2015 to 2019, the website was a part of Pan-Armenian Media Group (PAMG), a major media holding websites and outlets including Armenia TV, A-TV, ArmNews, Blognews.am, Radio Jan, and Lav Radio as a part to unite the TV channels and audiences. Aram Antinyan began managing the site in 2016.

Following the dissolution of the Pan-Armenian Media Group (PAMG) in 2019, several of its assets were transferred to the newly created company named Quartet Media CJSC along with TV company Armnews, and the radio station Radio 107 FM LLC (operating as Lav Radio/ArmNews FM) until 2022. After Quartet Media announced its closure in February 2022, Tert.am's ownership structure was still linked to Quartet Media through Tert Am LLC.

In 2025, the broadcast license for Radio 107 FM LLC was terminated while Tert.am and it's pages continue to operate but with reduce activities compared to the previous years. Although the company announced cessation of operations and Arman Sahakyan stated proposal to acquire ownership of both Tert.am and Radio 107 FM LLC but the State Register of Legal Entities still list Quartet Media CJSC as the owner of both companies.

Logo of Tert.am Life section

Logo of Tert.am Medicine

== Section ==
The current news headlines are categorized into the following section:

- Politics (Քաղաքականություն)
- Economy (Տնտեսություն)
- Law (Իրավունք)
- Event (Իրադարձային)
- Press digest (Մամուլի տեսություն)
- Science/tech (Գիտություն/տեխնիկա)
- Sports (Սպորտ)
- Culture (Մշակույթ)
- Entertainment (Ժամանց)
- Video (Տեսանյութ)
- About us (Մեր մասին)

== Features ==
The website's main core feature include:

- News about Armenia, the region and international developments and ongoing events.
- Covering mass topic include politics, economics, society, culture, sports, entertainment, technology, and health.
- Available in three languages - Armenian, Russian and English.
- Free content access.

== Viewers ==
Since 2021, it is one of the most popular websites in Armenia in terms of the frequency of visits, citations and references media resources but had dropped out of the top four most frequently visited site news

== See also ==
- Media in Armenia
