= ArmeniaNow =

2002–2016 Armenian news publication

- Format: Online
- Owner: New Times Journalism Training Center
- Editor: John Hughes
- Launched: July 2002
- Ceased publication: June 2016
- Language: English, Armenian
- Headquarters: 2 Mashtots Avenue, No 40, Yerevan, Armenia
- Website: www.armenianow.com

ArmeniaNow was an independent online news publication based in Yerevan, Armenia. It was published in English and Armenian. The publication was founded in July 2002 and published its last issue in June 2016. It was recognized as one of the principal web periodicals in Armenia. ArmeniaNow had a staff of 20 journalists with John Hughes as its editor-in-chief. Hughes is an American progressive.

ArmeniaNow was cited by various authors and political analysts and international organizations such as Human Rights Watch, Amnesty International, and Freedom House.

== See also ==
- List of newspapers in Armenia
