= Edik Baghdasaryan =

Armenian journalist

Edik Baghdasaryan (Armenian: Էդիկ Բաղդասարյան) is a prominent investigative journalist known for his stories exposing government corruption in Armenia. He is the head of the Armenian Association of Investigative Journalists and editor of Armenia's only investigative journalism newspaper, Hetq. He is based in Armenia's capital Yerevan.

== Awards ==
In September 2008, Baghdasaryan won the 2008 Global Shining Light Award at the Global Investigative Journalism Conference held in Norway for his series of articles "The Minister and the Mining Sector," which revealed how Armenia's former Minister of Nature Protection Vardan Ayvazyan had allocated mines (mostly for gold and poly-metallic) to more than a dozen relatives' names, thus violating several laws. Apart from Yerevan he also studied at Moscow University and got a degree in TV Journalism.

== Physical assaults and death threats ==
On November 17, 2008, Baghdasaryan became the target of a violent attack, which he believes is connected with his reporting. He was ambushed and beaten by three unknown assailants as he was getting into his parked car shortly after leaving his office in downtown Yerevan at 8 pm. Baghdasaryan said that the attack was unprovoked and that the assailants did not demand anything particular from him. Two people attacked him, dealing heavy blows to him, while a third person hit him behind the head with a large object, causing him to faint; they took off part of his clothing, leaving him half naked. The assailants fled after a security worker from a nearby construction site alerted by the quarrel fired a shot into the air. Baghdasaryan was hospitalized and suffered a head injury.

In 2006, Baghdasaryan received threats via email following an article that criticized Armenia’s most powerful businessman Gagik Tsarukyan. The email threatened to kill anyone who offended Tsarukyan, whom the letter writer referred to as "king."

== See also ==
- Media of Armenia
