= Telecom Armenia =

Armenian telecommunications company

- Native name: Տելեկոմ Արմենիա
- Formerly: Armentel (1995-2017); VEON Armenia (2017-2020)
- Type: OJSC
- Traded as: AMX: AMTL
- Industry: Telecommunications
- Founded: March 1995; 31 years ago
- Headquarters: Yerevan, Armenia,
- Key people: Hayk Yesayan (CEO)
- Products: Fixed-line and mobile telephony, broadband and fixed-line internet services
- Revenue: 35,132,114,000 Armenian dram (2024)
- Operating income: 2,358,504,000 Armenian dram (2024)
- Net income: 1,251,506,000 Armenian dram (2024)
- Total assets: 100,328,220,000 Armenian dram (2024)
- Number of employees: 1,911 (2022)
- Website: telecomarmenia.am

Telecom Armenia OJSC (Armenian: Տելեկոմ Արմենիա, romanized: Telecom Armenia) (formerly Armentel and VEON Armenia) is an Armenian broadband and telecommunications company, headquartered in Yerevan.

Telecom Armenia OJSC is the first telecommunications company in Armenia to conduct an initial public offering (IPO), becoming even more open and public. The company's shares are listed on the Armenia Stock Exchange.

== History ==
Telecom Armenia belongs to Team CJSC, which was founded by Armenian businessmen Hayk and Alexander Yesayan. In November 2020, Team CJSC (successor of Team LLC) acquired 100% shares of VEON Armenia CJSC (former Beeline TM), thus becoming the successor to the first telecommunications subsystem in Armenia. After the transaction, VEON Armenia was renamed to Telecom Armenia, which up to its rebranding was acting under the trademark Beeline.

In 2021, the company in partnership with Nokia launched the construction of unique in the region NGN (Next Generation Network) with the speed of 25 Gb/s and 25G-PON technology. In 2022, the network became available in 7 major regional cities, 3 villages, as well as in the Davtashen, Arabkir, and Avan administrative districts of Yerevan.

Telecom Armenia OJSC has re-equipped and improved the DWDM network, which served as an opportunity for actively penetrating into the Middle East market of transit network channels and sale of internet. Within a short time span, the company became one of the region's biggest exporters of transit network channels and internet to the Middle East. Currently, the company provides services to leading organizations in the field of telecommunications in more than 5 countries of the Middle East.

In order to build this network, improve access to high-speed internet in the country and with the aim of supporting the growth of strong digital economy in Armenia, in 2022 Telecom Armenia attracted funding of 45 million dollars from international financial institutions like the International Finance Corporation (IFC) and the European Bank of Reconstruction and Development (EBRD), as well as Ameriabank.

In 2023, Telecom Armenia transitioned from CJSC to OJSC.

== Operations ==
Telecom Armenia provides mobile connections of 2G (GSM), 3G (UMTS) and 4G (LTE) standards, fixed telephony services, and provides internet access with FTTH, FTTB, VDSL and ADSL technologies. The company also provides IPTV and OTT services of digital TV. Team TV subscribers have about 190 leading local and international TV channels on TV or mobile phone, and thanks to the catch-up function, the opportunity to watch the preferred program, film or TV program within 7 days after broadcast.

Through the company's My Team application, subscribers can check balance and package balances with one touch, change tariff packages, activate automatic payments, as well as get acquainted with the latest news and promotions of Telecom Armenia and make purchases from the e-shop online store.

Starting from 2022, financial transactions can be made in the branches of the "Team Pay" CJSC (Team Pay) payment settlement company located in 18 offices of Team Telecom Armenia under "One window".

== Corporate social responsibility ==
Within the framework of corporate social responsibility, the company supports technological, educational and scientific, as well as environmental projects, promotes the creation and distribution of Armenian content, as well as initiatives encouraging team spirit.

== See also ==
- List of mobile network operators in Europe
- Telecommunications in Armenia
