= Armenia 2 =

Second Armenian television channel

Armenia 2 (H2)
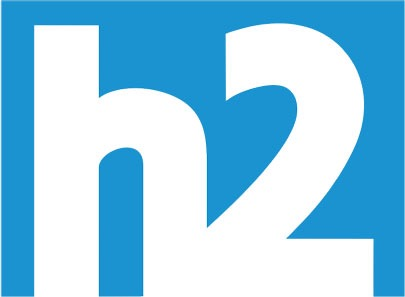
- Country: Armenia
- Broadcast area: Armenia; United States

Programming
- Language: Armenian
- Picture format: 4:3 SDTV; 16:9 HDTV

History
- Launched: 10 May 1999
- Replaced: Nork

Links
- Website: tv.am/en/

Availability

Terrestrial
- Digital terrestrial television: Varies within location

Second Armenian TV Channel Company (Armenian: Հայկական երկրորդ հեռուստաալիք), also known as H2 (Armenian: Հ2) or Armenia 2, is a private television company broadcasting in Armenia and Artsakh. Approximately 95% of the TV viewers of Armenia and Artsakh are able to watch the channel, which broadcasts 18 hours daily. The company employs 250 people.

The news block of the TV channel is called Lraber (Armenian: Լրաբեր, meaning "Herald") which has its own reporters throughout Armenia and Artsakh. The international overview is carried out based on the German Deutsche Welle TV channel. H2 TV also cooperates with the Russian channels Russia-1 and NTV and other foreign channels.

The president and the director of the TV channel is Samvel Mayrapetyan.

The offices and the studios of the TV are located in the Ajapnyak district of Yerevan.

== History ==
The frequencies that would later harbor Armenia 2 were first given to the state TV company under Soviet control.

In 1973, the 40th edition of the Armenian SSR media publication "Yerevan is On Air" published an article about the new channel, titled "Turn on channel 11 on the TV". As of 1978, the proportion of color programming on both channels was of at least 50%.

In 1996, the channel was separated under new management as Nork, with Robert Mavisakalyan appointed as its director.

Nork subsequently shut down and was handed over to a new private company (Prometheus). The new owners absorbed the staff of the former service, whose broadcasts started in 1999 on cable and terrestrially in 2001.

Per a decision of the Radio and Television Commission, the channel was stripped of its terrestrial coverage on 15 January 2021, during the attribution of slots for the digital terrestrial network, as the channel didn't have the rights to operate at a national level (the channel was limited to cable). Armenia 2 subsequently sued the commission, claiming that the decision was invalid, because the number of slots was reduced from 6 to 5.

== See also ==
- Television in Armenia
