= Armnews TV =

Armenian television channel

- Country: Armenia
- Headquarters: Yerevan

Programming
- Picture format: 1080i HDTV

Ownership
- Owner: Qaryak Media

History
- Launched: 31 October 2001
- Closed: 10 February 2022
- Replaced by: Armenian Business News

Links
- Website: www.armnewstv.am

Armnews TV (Armenian: Արմնյուզ հեռուստատեսություն) was a private television broadcasting company in Armenia. Armnews TV along with ATV and Armenia TV was part of PanArmenian Media. The owner of the channel was Hrachya Keshishyan from 2015 until the channel's closing.

On 10 February 2022, the channel was shut down after it was unable to renew its license.

== See also ==
- Television in Armenia
