= Hayastani Hanrapetutyun =

- Type: Daily official journal
- Founder: National Assembly of Armenia
- Publisher: State Press Publishing
- Founded: October 9, 1990 (first issue)
- Language: Armenian
- Headquarters: Yerevan, Armenia
- Circulation: 6,000 (as of 2007)
- Website: hhpress.am

Hayastani Hanrapetutyun (also spelled Hayastany Hanrapetutyun, Romanization of Հայաստանի Հանրապետություն, 'Republic of Armenia') was the official newspaper of Armenia, until it was dissolved by Ministry of Internal Affairs and Communications for financial reasons from June 1, 2023.

The newspaper was founded on September 6, 1990 by the Armenian parliament as its official publication. In 2000-2001, the newspaper was converted into a joint-stock company with the President's Office, the National Assembly, the Armenian government, and the Department of Information each holding a 25% share.

== See also ==
- List of government gazettes
- Media of Armenia
