= Association of European Journalists =

Organisation promoting interests of journalists

The Association of European Journalists (founded 1961, San Remo) is an organisation promoting the interests of journalists involved in European affairs. It is an NGO in operational relations with UNESCO and enjoys consultative status in the Council of Europe. It has chapters in various countries across Europe.
