= Public Television Company of Armenia =

Armenia's public television station

Public Television of Armenia
- Native name: Հայաստանի հանրային հեռուստաընկերություն
- Formerly: Armenian Television (1957–2000, company; 1957–1993, channel)
- Type: Public service broadcasting
- Industry: Mass media
- Founded: November 29, 1956; 69 years ago
- Founder: Supreme Soviet of the Soviet Union
- Headquarters: 26, G. Hovsepyan Street, Yerevan, Armenia
- Area served: National, International
- Key people: Hovhannes Movsisyan (Executive Director)
- Products: Broadcasting; web portals
- Services: Broadcast television; online
- Owner: Government of Armenia
- Divisions: Armenia 1; Nork; Nor Alik; Ararat
- Website: 1tv.am

Armenia 1 (1TV)
- Country: Armenia
- Broadcast area: Armenia, Europe, Middle East and North Africa

Programming
- Language: Armenian
- Picture format: 16:9 HDTV

Ownership
- Owner: Public Television of Armenia

History
- Launched: November 29, 1956; 69 years ago

Availability

Terrestrial
- Digital terrestrial television: Channel 1

Public Television of Armenia (Armenian: Հայաստանի Հանրային Հեռուստաընկերություն, romanized: Hayastani Hanrayin Herrustaynkerut'yun; 1TV), also known as AMPTV or ARMTV, is an Armenian public television station that began transmissions in 1956.

== History ==
=== Early years ===
Armenia Public Television dates back to September 5, 1955, when the USSR Council of Ministers made the decision to construct 27 programme centres and five transmission stations in the Union Republics. On November 29, 1956, the date of Sovietization of Armenia, the first programme of Armenian television was transmitted. Until December 31, the station mostly aired films; on that day, a New Year's special was broadcast, and on January 2, 1957, the first programme for children. In this phase, Armenian television was still a pilot service.

The official opening of the Armenian television took place on February 9, 1957, as regular programmes began to air. Initially, the staff believed that television would deliver cultural values to viewers. The station broadcast four days a week, Tuesdays, Thursdays, Saturdays and Sundays. Later that year on August 6, 1957, the first news programme was transmitted, titled the News of the Week. At first the news programme was not periodical, but by February, 1958, the news programme became periodical, which resulted in the creation of the news editorial office.

On October 13, 1957, the State Committee on Radio and Television Programmes of the Council of Ministers of the Armenian Soviet Socialist Republic was formed. According to the decree of the USSR Supreme Soviet issued in December 1970, the State Committee on Radio transmission and Television was renamed the All-Union Republican State Committee on Television and Radio Transmission.

In 1968, the 2750th anniversary of Yerevan was celebrated across the USSR, with special programmes held in other Soviet republics from May to October. Soviet Central Television allocated 1.5 hours of airtime to Armenian-made specials for the occasion. In the early 1970s, work for a second television channel began, thanks to the opening of a microwave link between Yerevan and Kapan in November 1970, enabling the carriage of programmes from Moscow in real time. By January 1, 1973, virtually all of the Armenian SSR received the second channel. The 40th issue of Yerevan Presents, a magazine dedicated to Armenian television, had the tagline "Turn on to Channel 11" in its cover. On Sundays, Hamaynapatker became the new Sunday evening news programme. The existing TV News was renamed Lraber on October 27, 1975.

In March 1973, the television station began preparations for the changeover to transmissions in colour. Engineers for a colour mobile station, TV production laboratory, video recording units were obtained to begin this process. On May 1, 1973, the station made its first colour transmission from Lenin Square for the May Day Parade. Initially, the colour programmes were transmitted only from the mobile station, from the large celebrations, concerts, sport events of the country. Starting from 1978 about 50 percent of the programmes of the first and the second Armenian channels were in colour. Starting in August 1973 Armenian Television began broadcasting videotape produced programming, which made up 70 percent of the programmes aired in 1978. Lraber made the conversion on April 1, 1978.

In November 1977 a new 311.7 metres (1,023 feet) high television tower was erected, and with the launch of "Orbita-2" - a space communication station, Armenia began to broadcast the second programme of Central Television from Moscow via satellite. In 1978, it also became possible to receive the fourth channel of Central Television in Armenia.

1982 was marked by the 25th anniversary of regular broadcasts, the first film shot for Armenian television and the Yerevan Presents publication, as well as the tenth anniversary of the Yerevan studio. In 1988, with a tense political scenario, the network began to "open up" to the public, coupled by the improvement of its journalism.

=== After the Soviet era ===
As political powers began changing in 1990, the then prime minister, Vazgen Manukyan, appointed Henrik Hovhannisyan, a non-communist, to be the head of the State Department of Television and Radio programmes. He started the reformation of the Armenian television, both in terms of content and structure. Those changes were called to comply with the situation of the Kharabagh Freedom movement, and the breakdown of USSR. The early 90s were marked by constant changes, making it free of Soviet-era censorship and more democratic in nature.

Armenia declared its independence on September 21, 1991. Days after that, Haylur became the new news program, as a democratic alternative to Lraber, which still aired. Early editions ended with a song, often from Ruben Hakhverdyan. A month later, the president of the country signed the RA Law "On Mass Media". For the first time in Armenia the information system had an opportunity to develop in a free and favourable environment. The freedom of speech and purely national propaganda were predominant for the Armenian television.

The economic crisis of the country seriously influenced the functioning of the National television. Capacity was significantly cut and the quantity of viewers decreased. Villages only received 2-3 hours of electricity a day and its equipment was beginning to fall. This prompted Armenian Television to cut its airtime by two thirds. According to the data of November–December 1993, the statistical TV audience was 27.4%. Cable TV companies and independent stations emerged at the end of 1991, bringing competition for the first time. The first Armenian-dubbed series, My Second Mother, aired in 1993, following two investments from the US-Armenian Hayastan fund, which totalled US$440,000. That year, a satellite link was established, using Intelsat's services.

In November 1996, the 40th anniversary of the Armenian television was celebrated with festivities. The national television continued to preserve with great difficulty what has been created during the former years. The bulk of the programs were entertainment and comedy programs. A third edition of Lraber was added at 6pm. Orakarg with Tigran Naghdalyan premiered in 1997. The same year, the channel adopted a logo reading Հ1 (H1). The station began delivering its satellite signal on February 24, 1999, thanks to an agreement between the Government of Armenia and Telespazio.

In 1996, the second channel of Armenian television separated and became a channel in its own right. Robert Mavisakalyan was appointed director of Nork television. Within a short period of time "Nork" was able to attract the attention of the bulk of the audience.

In 2000, television was restructured and renamed the Public Television Company. The country's legislation at the time required Armenia 1 (Hayastan 1) to broadcast all foreign films and series dubbed into Armenian. It was not until 2005 that the language requirement was raised.

New roads and prospects opened for the Armenian Public Television in 2005. The Armenian Public Television and Radio were recognised full and equal members of the European Broadcasting Union at the 56th General Assembly of the European Broadcasting Union held in Dubrovnik on July 7 and July 8. Becoming an Active Member of the European Broadcasting Union, Armenia gained the right to take part in the Eurovision Song Contest, which during the 50 years had already become a favourite event for the Europeans.

In 2015, the channel acquired a mobile HD station with ten HD cameras and a satellite transmitter, the station came into place thanks to funds from China. On 13 September 2016, the channel switched to HD broadcasts.

The channel is broadcast internationally via 2 satellites: Hotbird 13G, unencrypted, since 1999, and on Eutelsat 70B, encrypted with BISS, since 2013.

== Services ==
=== Current ===
- Armenia 1 (Armenian: Հայաստան 1) (also known nationally as 1TV and The First Channel) – a generalist channel broadcast since November 29, 1956 which has a constitutional obligation to provide citizens the right to receive free political, economic, cultural, historical, scientific, sports, educational, variety and news broadcasts.
  - First Channel International (Armenian: Առաջինի միջազգային ալիք), launched in 2024, is a satellite channel broadcasting across Europe, the Middle East, and North Africa.
  - First Channel America (Armenian: Առաջին ալիք Ամերիկա), launched in 2024, serves both North and South America.
- First Channel News, launched in 2021, is a 24-hour news and information channel.

=== Defunct ===
- Nork, or Norq TV (closed in 1998), previously known as Second Program (1973–1991) and Second Channel (1991–1996) – a generalist channel which was replaced by privately run station Armenia 2 (H2) in 1999
- Nor Alik (English: New Channel) (2002–2008), previously known as H1 Yerevan (2002–2004) – entertainment and music programming, replaced by Ararat
- Ararat (2008–2011) – arts and culture programming

== Management ==
- Nerses Kagramanov: Director of Armenian Television (1956–1960)
- Marat Martinosyan: First Creative Director of Armenian Television (1956–1964), Director of Television (1966–1971)

=== Chair of State Committee ===
- John Kirakosyan (1966–1969)
- Mavr Davtyan (1969–1970)
- Stepan Poghosyan (1970–1988)
- Emanuel Araksman-Manukyan (1988–1990)
- Henrik Hovhannisyan (1990–1991)

=== Head of State Department ===
- Samvel Gevorgyan (1991–1993)
- Tigran Hakobyan (1993–1995)

=== Executive Directors ===
- Robert Mavisakalyan (1995–1996)
- Perch Stepanyan (1996–1997)
- Hamlet Gasparyan (1997–1998)
- Tigran Naghdalyan (1998–2000)
- Armen Arzumanyan (2001–2010)
- Gagik Buniatyan (2010–2013)
- Margarita Grigoryan (2013–2020)
- Hovhannes Movsisyan (2020–present)

== Logo gallery ==
1997–2013

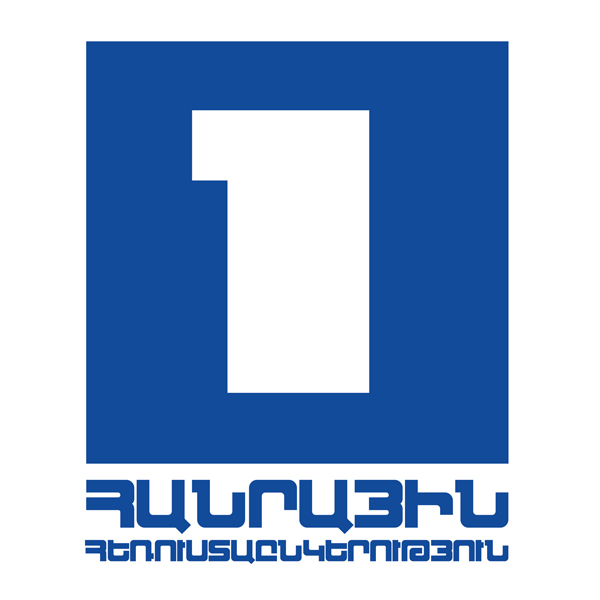
2013–2021

== See also ==
- Armenia in the Eurovision Song Contest
- Media of Armenia
- Public Radio of Armenia
- Television in Armenia
