= ArmSwissBank =

ArmSwissBank CJSC
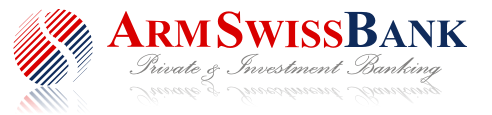
- Industry: Banking
- Founded: 2005
- Headquarters: Yerevan, Armenia
- Key people: Gevorg Machanyan, CEO
- Products: Consumer Banking; Private Banking; Corporate Banking; Investment Banking
- Total assets: ▲USD 98 million (31.12.10)
- Number of employees: 80
- Website: armswissbank.am

ArmSwissBank CJSC is a private and investment bank founded in Yerevan in February 2005 after receiving its banking license N84 from the Central Bank of Armenia. Shortly after, the bank was also granted a brokerage license (NBG 0064) and custody license (NPG 0065) to expand its activities. The bank collaborates with KfW and EBRD within the scope of renewable energy and corporate lending programs.

As a member of FCI (Factors Chain International), it has joined international payment systems such as Swift, CBANet and BankMail to ease transfers with correspondent banks : Commerzbank AG, UBS AG, Raiffeisen, UniCreditBank, etc.

In December 2010, ArmSwissBank was the sole underwriter for Artsakh HEK second IPO which fully raised USD 4.3 million on the Armenian Stock Exchange. For that same year, the bank won the title of the Best Exchange Member in Government Bonds Market by NASDAQ OMX Armenia.

ArmSwissBank is a member of the European Business Association (Armenia).

== See also ==
- Economy of Armenia
- List of banks
- List of banks in Armenia
