= Ardshinbank =

Armenian bank

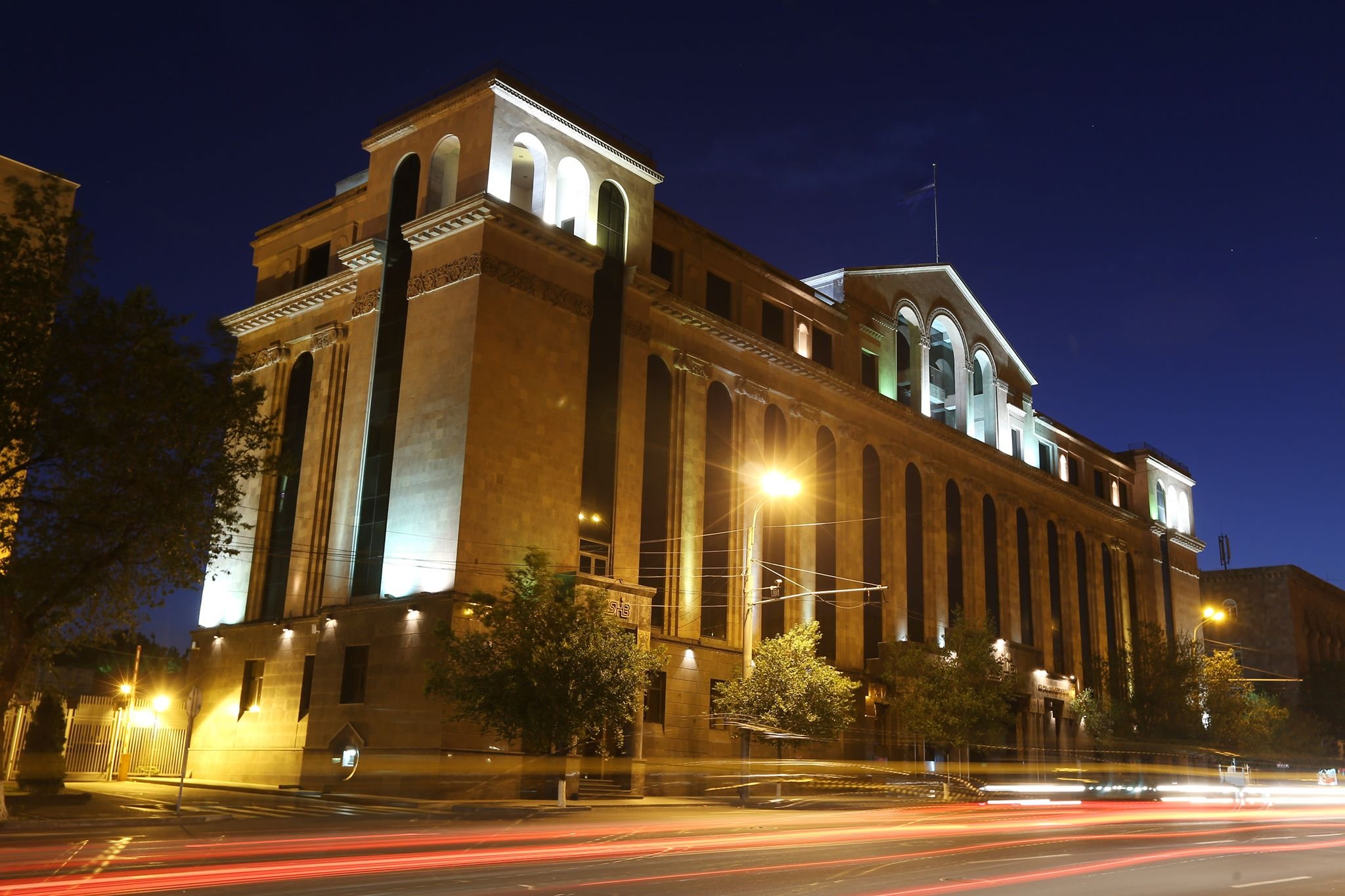
- Ardshinbank's headquarters in Yerevan
- Type: CJSC
- Industry: Banking, Financial services
- Predecessor: Vahe Stepanyan
- Founded: 2003; 23 years ago
- Headquarters: Yerevan, Armenia
- Key people: Artak Ananyan (Chairman)
- Products: Credit cards, consumer banking, corporate banking, investment banking, mortgage loans
- Net income: ▲AMD 6'471,662 mln. (2018)
- Total assets: ▲AMD 672'989 mln. (2018)
- Number of employees: 1,089 (January 2019)
- Website: www.ardshinbank.am

Ardshinbank CJSC (Armenian: Արդշինբանկ ՓԲԸ) is an Armenian commercial bank. The full name of the bank is the "Industrial Construction Bank CJSC".

== History ==
Ardshinbank was founded in 2002. In February 2003, it received a banking license no. 83 (dated 25.02.03). Originally, Ardshinbank was called "Ardshininvestbank". In November 2014, it was rebranded into "Ardshinbank" CJSC.

Ardshinbank is a universal financial and credit institution offering a full range of banking services. The priority areas include project financing for large corporate customers, primarily in the strategic industries and energy sector of Armenia, as well as lending to small and medium-sized businesses, emission and service of plastic cards, e-banking, international money transfers, as well as mortgage lending to different population groups and salary projects. In addition, the bank is actively developing electronic and mobile banking services, which make it possible to carry out main banking operations 24/7.

Ardshinbank has ratings from two international rating agencies - Moody's and Fitch, equal to the rating of Sovereign.

Ardshinbank is an RA securities market participant and an agent in the government bonds markets. It is the first private entity in Armenia to issue eurobonds in the amount of US$100 million (in formats RegS/144A).

With its 60 branches, the bank has one of the largest branch networks in the country, in addition to a representative office in Paris. As of January 2019, the bank has 1,089 employees.

== Founders and shareholders ==
- Founders: “Rasco-Armenia” CJSC, “Center for Business Investments” LLC.
- Shareholders: Karen Safaryan, the owner of 100% of the shares of “Region” CJSC, who in turn is the only participant of “Arins Group” LLC (on 06.06.2017 “Center for Business Investments” LLC was renamed to "Arins Group" LLC); individuals.

== Participation in the financial market ==
Ardshinbank is a member of the Union of Banks of Armenia, the Armenian-Georgian Association of Business Cooperation, NASDAQ OMX ARMENIA OJSC, Association of Armenian Mortgage Market Participants, an affiliated member of MasterCard Europay, a principal member of Visa International payment system, a shareholder of SWIFT International Financial Telecommunication System, the Armenian Card CJSC, and the settlement system of the Central Depository of Armenia.

== Awards and recognition ==
The bank has received the following recognitions:

- 2005 - Citigroup's diploma of quality for executing dollar payments via Citibank New York.
- 2005/2006 - Diploma of the best dealer in managing domestic debt of the Ministry of Finance and Economy and the Central Bank of Armenia.
- 2009 - Certificate of MoneyGram International money transfer system as the most reliable bank of Armenia.
- 2010 - Citibank's prize for high quality of money transfers in USD. Commerzbank's prize for high quality of money transfers in euro.
- 2014 - “Bank of the Year” from the British magazine The Banker.
- 2015 - "Best Bank in Armenia for the year of 2015" from the British magazine Euromoney.
- 2016 - “Most Active Issuing Bank in Armenia in 2016” under the European Bank for Reconstruction and Development's (EBRD) Trade Facilitation Program (TFP) from the EBRD.
- 2017 - “Safest Bank in Armenia for 2017” from the American magazine Global Finance. “Best Foreign Exchange Provider in Armenia for 2017” from Global Finance. “Best Bank in Armenia for 2018” from Global Finance. “TFP Momentum Award” from the Asian Development Bank.
- 2018 - “Safest Bank in Armenia for 2018" from the American magazine “Global Finance”. “Most active partner of Eikon platform” from Thomson Reuters.
- 2019 - “Best Bank in Armenia in 2019” by the American magazine “Global Finance”. “Most Active Issuing Bank in Armenia in 2018” from the International Investment Bank (IIB). “Best Bank in Armenia in 2018” from the British magazine “The Banker”.

== Mergers and acquisitions ==
During March–May 2003, Ardshinbank acquired a significant share of the assets and liabilities of the OJSC “Ardshinbank”, including its 24 branches. Later, In November of the same year, Ardshinbank purchased the main part of OJSC “Agrobank”, including its 35 branches and the rest of infrastructure.

In 2016, the "Region" Finance Industrial Corporation CJSC, whose sole shareholder is Karen Safaryan, the sole beneficiary and the chairman of the Board of "Ardshinbank" CJSC, acquired 100% shares of "Areximbank-Gazprombank Group" CJSC from its sole shareholder, the Russian Gazprombank. Thus, Areximbank and its entire branch network (16) merged with Ardshinbank.

== See also ==
- Economy of Armenia
- List of banks
- List of banks in Armenia

== Additional Links ==
1. https://d2tyltutevw8th.cloudfront.net/media/document/best-banks-in-asia-pacific-2019-1552488790.pdf
2. https://finport.am/full_news.php?id=36503&lang=3
3. https://d2tyltutevw8th.cloudfront.net/media/document/press-release-global-finance-names-the-safest-ban-1537284512.pdf
4. https://www.tert.am/en/news/2019/04/03/Fitch/2963881
5. https://www.ardshinbank.am/sites/default/files/reports/Ardshinbank%20Final%20FS_2018.pdf
6. https://www.moodys.com/credit-ratings/Ardshinbank-CJSC-credit-rating-809510108
7. https://news.am/eng/news/484226.html
8. https://www.fitchratings.com/site/pr/987792
9. http://cbonds.com/emissions/issue/156987
