= HSBC Bank Armenia =

HSBC Bank Armenia CJSC Էյչ-Էս-Բի-Սի Բանկ Հայաստան ՓԲԸ-ն
- Company type: Subsidiary of HSBC Holdings plc
- Industry: Finance and Insurance
- Founded: 1996
- Defunct: 2024
- Headquarters: Yerevan, Armenia
- Key people: Irina Seylanyan, CEO
- Products: Financial services

HSBC Bank Armenia CJSC (Armenian: Էյչ-Էս-Բի-Սի Բանկ Հայաստան ՓԲԸ-ն) was a subsidiary of HSBC Holdings plc headquartered in Yerevan, Armenia. The bank provided personal banking and corporate banking services. In 2024, Ardshinbank acquired HSBC Armenia.

== History ==
HSBC commenced operations in Armenia on March 4, 1996, under the name Midland Armenia Bank O.J.S.C. This was the first international bank in the country after the Armenian restoration of independence from the Soviet Union, aiming to bolster confidence in Armenia's financial sector and attract foreign investment.

In 1999, the bank underwent a rebranding, adopting the name HSBC Bank Armenia to align with its parent company's global identity. Initially, HSBC held a 70% ownership stake, with the remaining 30% owned by members of the overseas Armenian business community.

In 2023, HSBC Bank Armenia reported a net profit exceeding 11 billion Armenian drams, served approximately 33,000 customers through 10 offices located in Yerevan and operated 55 ATM machines. It had total assets worth 290 billion Armenian drams and around 200 billion Armenian drams in customer deposits.

HSBC Armenia's eventual sale to Ardshinbank began on February 6, 2024. The acquisition was completed on 29 November, 2024, with Ardshinbank purchasing 100% of HSBC Armenia's equity. The bank was renamed "Ardshininvestbank" after the sale was finalised.

== See also ==
- List of banks in Armenia
