= Tigran Sargsyan =

Armenian politician (born 1960)

- Տիգրան Սարգսյան
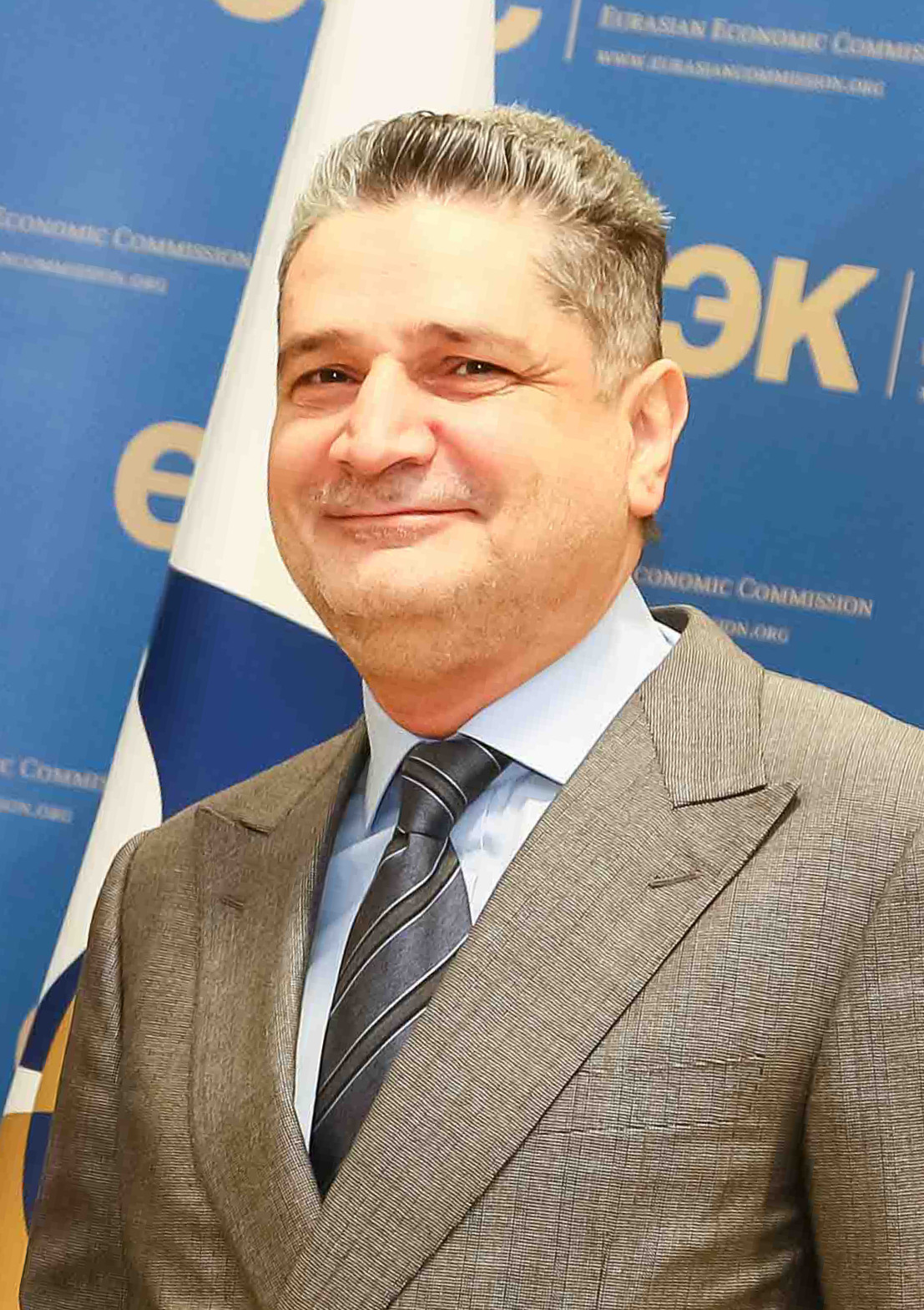
- Sargsyan in 2016

Chairman of the Board of the Eurasian Economic Commission
- In office 1 February 2016 – 1 February 2020
- Preceded by: Viktor Khristenko
- Succeeded by: Mikhail Myasnikovich

Armenian Ambassador to the United States
- In office 15 July 2014 – 12 January 2016
- Preceded by: Tatoul Markarian
- Succeeded by: Grigor Hovhannissian

12th Prime Minister of Armenia
- In office 9 April 2008 – 3 April 2014
- President: Serzh Sargsyan
- Preceded by: Serzh Sargsyan
- Succeeded by: Hovik Abrahamyan

3rd Chairman of the Central Bank of Armenia
- In office 3 March 1998 – 9 April 2008
- President: Robert Kocharyan
- Preceded by: Bagrat Asatryan
- Succeeded by: Arthur Javadyan

Personal details
- Born: 29 January 1960 (age 66) Kirovakan, Armenian SSR, Soviet Union (now Vanadzor, Armenia)
- Party: Republican Party
- Education: Leningrad Institute of Economics and Finance

Tigran Sureni Sargsyan (Armenian: Տիգրան Սուրենի Սարգսյան; born 29 January 1960) is an Armenian political figure who was Prime Minister of Armenia from 2008 to 2014. Previously he was Chairman of the Central Bank of Armenia from 1998 to 2008. After leaving office as prime minister, he served as ambassador to the United States from 2014 to 2016 and as chairman of the board of the Eurasian Economic Commission from 2016 to 2020.

== Biography ==
Tigran Sargsyan was born on 29 January 1960 in the city of Vanadzor, Armenian SSR. He was still a child, when his family moved to Yerevan, where in 1967–1977 Sargsyan received his primary education at Yerevan Pushkin School No. 8.

== Education ==
Tigran Sargsyan entered Yerevan Technical College No. 14, graduating in 1978. The same year Sargsyan entered Yerevan Institute of National Economy, Faculty of Economy and Planning. In 1980 he entered Leningrad Financial and Economic Institute after N. A. Voznesenskiy, from which he graduated in 1983.

In 1987 Tigran Sargsyan received his PhD at Leningrad Financial and Economic Institute, where he defended his thesis titled "Regional social-economic development planning on Armenia's example".

In 1994 Tigran Sargsyan studied at the Faculty of "Law-making Activity," in the International Law Institute, Washington, D.C., United States.

In 1996–1997 he studied "Effective Banking Management" at the Institute of Economic Development, World Bank, Washington, United States.

== Career start ==
After receiving the PhD degree in economics he returned to Armenia in 1987 and became a senior researcher and head of the Group of International Economic Relations at the Research Institute of Economy and Planning of Armenia, where he worked until 1990.

From 1988 to 1993 he served as the chairman of the national council of young professionals and scientists. From 1990 to 1991 he worked as a coordinator for the regular seminars on economic reform organized for the bankers.

== Political career ==
Tigran Sargsyan was one of the founders of the party "National Democratic Union" in 1991.

In 1993–1995 Tigran Sargsian was elected as a member of the Supreme Council of the Republic of Armenia within "National Democrats" fraction headed by Shavarsh Kocharyan. Sargsyan became chairman of the Standing Committee on Financial-Credit and Budgetary Affairs and was the youngest head of the chairman in the Parliament. In this position he had a significant contribution to the conduct of Armenian Dram – national currency into circulation.

=== National Currency Introduction ===
Despite the fact that he was the representative of the opposition in parliament, Sargsyan was appointed as a chairman of the Standing Committee on Financial-Credit and Budgetary Affairs of the Parliament of Armenia.

Together with the chairman of the Central Bank of Isaac Isaakyan and Finance Minister Levon Barkhudaryan, Tigran Sargsyan was appointed as a co-chairman of the State Commission for regulation of currency, created by the Supreme Council of the Republic of Armenia on 13 October 1993. Commission adopted more than 20 important decisions and on 22 November 1993 Armenian dram – national currency was put in circulation. Issued banknotes and coins had a nominal value of 10, 25, 50, 100, 200 and 500 drams.

=== Activity since 1995 ===
From 1995 to 1998 he was the director of Scientific Researches Institute of Social Reforms.

From 1995 to 1998 he was the chairman of Armenian Banks Association. Sargsyan occupied the post of Chairman of the Central Bank of Armenia (CBA) from 3 March 1998 and was reelected by the Armenian National Assembly as CBA chairman for a second seven-year term on 2 March 2005. As many as 92 MPs participated in the vote, of which 86 cast their vote for his candidacy.

== Chairman of the Central Bank (1998–2008) ==
On 3 March 1998 Tigran Sargsyan was elected the chairman of the Central Bank of Armenia, which significantly changed the situation in the banking sector of Armenia. In particular, in that very year the international accounting standards were introduced. In 2005, Sargsyan was re-elected as a chairman of the Central Bank, for the second term.

From 1998 to 2008 his signature was depicted on the currency in Armenia.

=== Reforms ===
In 1998 Tigran Sargsyan introduced the compulsory use of international accounting standards in Armenia. Until 1998, the Armenian Soviet standards were used, and the reports did not meet the modern requirements. The system still operates in Armenia up today. In 1999 Central Bank of Armenia introduced a system of electronic payment, entitled CBA.NET. This was a RTGS Payment System, and it automates the cash flow between the Armenian banks. Until then, any transactions between the banks were made using paper handling. The system operates in Armenia up today. In 2001 Central Bank of Armenia introduced the National Payment System called ARCA (Armenian Card), which later began supporting local ARCA cards. ARCA also became a platform for the operations of Mastercard, Visa, American Express and Diners Club, using a single processing center, technology and software solutions.

As a head of the Central Bank. Sargsyan initiated process of crystallization of banking sector from unfair business and crime. In 2002 the amendments on the Law on the Central Bank of Armenia and the Banking Act were adopted. The changes entitled The Board of the Central Bank, to prevent crime acquisition of bank assets and lending institutions.

In the future regulatory framework it was possible to adjust the process of tracking the turnover of criminal assets in banks and credit organizations, as well as the funds used to finance terrorist activities or money laundering. As a result, a number of unscrupulous banks and organizations were closed. Credit Yerevan, the United Bank, Land Bank, Credit Service, Trust, AgroBank, Shirak Invest and others were dissolved. As a result of investigating the flow of funds from organizations engaged in unfair practices, it was possible to refund all the deposits to the citizens. By 2004 the process of recovery of the banking system was completed.

In 2002 Armenia adopted amendments to the Law of the Republic of Armenia on Licensing. The list of the organizations to be a subject of licensing included credit organizations, which involved in money transactions, clearing, processing card payments, and others.

=== The deposit insurance system (2004) ===
In 2004 a law on compulsory insurance contributions to citizens were adopted in Armenia initiated by Tigran Sargsyan. On the basis of this law in 2005 The Fund was established, which should refund deposits to the citizens. The fund was financed by deposits from all the banks and financial institutions. The maximum size of the contribution was 4 million drams to be increased in the future. Size of deposits in foreign currency was equal to 2 mln drams.

=== Building a mega-regulator of the financial system (2006) ===
At 1 January 2006 the system of banking, insurance supervision and oversight of the securities market have been merged into a single system – a mega-regulator of the financial system. It introduced a unified system of financial regulation and risk-based supervision. The function of regulating the activities of all participants in the financial system and financial supervision was entrusted to the Central Bank of Armenia. The Central bank also became responsible for ensuring financial stability in Armenia.

=== Inflation targeting (2006) ===
In 2006 under the leadership of Tigran Sargsyan, the legal acts were adopted to implement the policy of targeting monetary aggregates to inflation targeting strategy to publish analysis on the monetary policy of the Central Bank.

=== Scope of Insurance (2007) ===
In 2007 the "Law on Insurance and Insurance Activities" were adopted, which was drafted in cooperation with the European Union.

== Prime Minister (2008–2014) ==
9 April 2008 Tigran Sargsyan was appointed as the Prime Minister of Armenia, replacing Serzh Sargsyan in this position, who was elected the president of Armenia earlier that year. From 22 April new government started working, consisting of 18 ministries. The minister for territorial development combined position of the Deputy Prime Minister. The government included representatives of the parliament coalition from parties: Republican Party of Armenia, Prosperous Armenia, Armenian Revolutionary Federation and The Rule of Law.

Two months following the appointment of Sargsyan Russo-Georgian War bursts out which seriously hurt economy of Armenia blockaded by Turkey and Azerbaijan for more than 20 years, and 70% of imported products are from Georgia.

=== 2008 Financial Crisis ===
The next year after Sargsyan government start, second wave of the 2008 financial crisis reached Armenia, which led to 14.1% fall of GDP. Because of strong banking system of Armenia, the crisis did not hurt Armenian banks, but the main collapse occurred in the construction sector, where the decrease volume was 41.6%. Production tax rates reduced to 22.5%. The collapse in these two areas was more than 10-% decrease in general share of GDP.

Commenting on the Economic collapse Tigran Sargsyan said: "The Housing bubble that was inflated, burst, causing negative phenomenon". He also highlighted necessity to diversify the economy. Among causes of economic collapse were marked decrease in the level of foreign transfers, reduction of prices on the international market of raw, and in particular non-ferrous metals market got lesser interest in goods exported from Armenia, as well as reduced liquidity in the international market and the subsequent fall of investment level.

12 November 2008 Tigran Sargsyan presented anti-crisis program of the government. 4 December 2008 according to protocol decision of the Armenian Government the list of anti-crisis measures was approved. Among the main activities were mentioned the following:

- Tax reform – simplification of tax administration,
- Customs reform – simplification of customs procedures,
- Improving the business environment – simplification of legal entities creating process
- Development of infrastructure – road construction, work in the field of electric power industry and energy supply
- Construction – providing state guarantees and subsidies to property developers
- Promotion of the real sector – participation in equity capital, loans, financing of business projects
- Social Projects

=== Supporting Real Economy Sector ===
Following years, the government supported the real economy sector. Special committee was created to study individual business projects, granting support to the best ones. Support was provided to 24 successful projects out of 300 presented projects. Commission was operating to support small and medium-sized businesses, provided direct financial and advisory support to a number of companies throughout Armenia.

The result was that in 2010 and 2011 industrial production index growth was 9.7% and 14.1% respectively, occurring the best performance since 2004. As a result of investments into the real economy prevented large scale staff dismissal in industrial enterprises. Policy brought to number increase of industrial enterprises by 6.3%, and increase of the average wage in industrial enterprises for 60 thousand drams.

=== Infrastructure projects development ===
In frames of anti-crisis measures development to infrastructure projects, building of roads, schools and hospitals was carried out around Armenia. Prior to 2011 following fulfillments were implemented:

- 2280 km of drinking and irrigation water lines built,
- 106 pumping stations for drinking water built,
- 209 reservoirs for drinking water built,
- 473 km of irrigation water lines and pipes,
- 130 pump stations for irrigation water,
- 45 reservoir for irrigation water,
- 1767 km of drainage,
- 150 km of general canals.

Prior to 2011, 105,3 billion drams was spent on capital construction of water systems in Armenia. That is twice more than expenditures in 2002–2006. About 500 communities benefited from the building, having total population of 700 thousand people.

=== Social programs ===
In frames of anti-crisis measures Sargsyan government declared support to social programs. Preferential mortgage system was put in action for young families. Prior to 2011, 462 young families used the system. Social package was instituted.

Resulting proper investigations 17 thousand families were deprived of social pensions. 9000 families in need were included into the list. Investigations 65 000 individual cases, 5000 people receive pensions, which they were cut off before. 1718 names of fake and deceased people were removed from the list of beneficiaries. Level of basic pension was raised for 2,5 times.

According to World Bank report, government anti-crisis program prevented helped poverty level fall to 51.7%.

Since 2008 Tigran Sargsyan government initiated negotiations with Asian Development Bank about financing of highway that would connect north and south of Armenia. Project primary budget was estimated about $500 million. 4-lane highway with total length of 556 km was planned to lead through Agarak – Kapan – Yerevan – Gyumri – Bavra, connecting Iran to Georgia. Armenian government approved the investment project on 14 January 2010.

First tranche contract was signed on 15 October 2009. Project developer became French Egis Group. Contractor became Corsan-Corviam Construccion from Spain. Project manager company became SAFEGE from France and EPTISA from Spain. First tranche was planned for construction of Yerevan – Ashtarak (14.1 km) and Yerevan – Ararat (38.1 km).

Second tranche contract was signed on 30 May 2011. $210 million sum was planned for Ashtarak – Talin (41.9 km) road construction. Third tranche contract was signed on 18 November 2013 with European Investment Bank with sum of 60 million Euro and on 11 March 2014 with Asian Development Bank with sum of 100 million US dollars. Contractor was not chosen at the moment of signing yet.

During a press conference with Georgian prime-minister Tigran Sargsyan answered question on North-South Highway: "For the first time in history Armenia will have a modern highway, meeting international standards and requirements that cars will have opportunity to cross Georgia border at high speed. Our Georgian partners implement a similar program with Asian Development Bank."

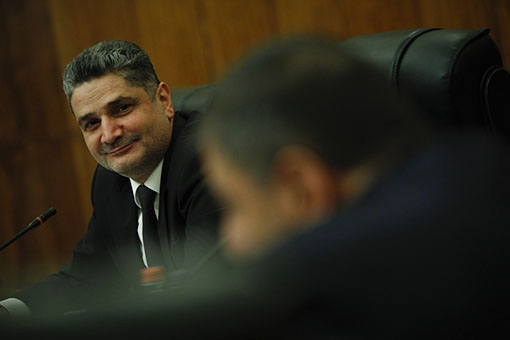
Tigran Sargsyan, as Prime-Minister of Armenia

Tigran Sargsyan government adopted a program for development of electronic government. Specially for that task specialists were invited from Estonia, which was considered one of the best electronic government systems around the world. At first stages electronic document flow was launched at Yerevan Municipality, Central Bank, as well as Mulberry system, which in 2011 included 35 state institutions. System was used by a number of private companies, i.e. ArmRosGazProm and Nairit Factory. System made it possible for citizens to check processing of their applications and documents, as well as watching activity of government, budget expenditures, etc.

Before system launching level of computerization was rather low: 200 employees has average of 60 computers. At first stages Government staff, Ministry of Foreign Affairs, Ministry of Finance and Ministry of Territorial Administration became experimental platforms for system launching. First stage was over by end of 2008. During 2009 rest of ministries and regional staff joined the system.

According to David Sargsyan, head of Government staff in 2008 – 2013, necessity of such a system development was included in Serzh Sargsyan election program.

=== Road construction ===
Tigran Sargsyan government increased expenses on road building, completing construction of 1576.9 km roads and 60 bridges, which is twice more than construction level in 1997 – 2006. Average budget for road building reached 22.6 billion drams against 13.7 billions in the period before. Average length of road constructed reached 315 km per year against 164 in the past.

=== Energy sector ===
In April 2010 the new energy block of Yerevan Thermal Power Station was launched, built with support of Japan Bank for International Cooperation. Total installed capacity got equal to 271.7 MW, out of which 242 MW of electric capacity and 434.9 GJ/h. Work of the new plant got more effective for 14-14.5 billion drams.

In period before 2011 69 Low power hydro electric stations were built, producing 1.4 billion kWt electricity per hour.

In January 2012 fifth energy block of Hrazdan Thermal Power Plant was launched having capacity of 480 MW with 17 substations with total capacity of 110 MW.

New high-voltage electric double line system was built connecting Armenia and Iran. 190 km alternative gas pipeline was built connecting Armenia and Iran.

=== Air communication ===
In period before 2011 significant amount of investments were attracted to air communication sector of Armenia. Zvartnots airport was purchased by Eduardo Eurnekian – Argentinean businessman of Armenian origin, who owns dozens of airports around the world. Zvartnots Airport was completely modernized and new building of the airport was constructed. Shirak – second largest airport of Armenia was modernized too. Total amount of investment reached 70 million US dollars.

=== Demonopolisation of telecommunication sector ===
During the years of Tigran Sargsyan governance third mobile operator – Orange Armenia was invited to Armenia. Also conditions were made for third internet supplier to Armenian internet providers entered market. Before that factual monopoly affected Armenia: only 2 companies provided Armenia with internet – Armentel – part of Beeline group of companies, and Fibernet. Then minister of transport and communications Andranik Manukyan was named owner of the company. The new internet supplier getting permission for functioning became GNC Alfa.

In the result of demonopolisation of internet and mobile market brought to significant fall of prices: in 2007 1 Mbit of unlimited internet cost 2.9 million drams (about $8900), while in 2011 price fall to 24000 drams for 1 Mbit ($64). Number of internet users increased 19 times reaching 380 000 (every second family in Armenia). Number of mobile services users increased to 3 380 000 from 1 118 000.

=== Business environment reform ===
27 June 2008 government program was adopted having objective to improve business environment. Program called for reform of taxation sector, sector of international trade, contracts fulfillment, as well as liquidation of legal entities. During government session, heads of ministries were encharged to report on activities implemented in frames of the reforms. Minister of Economy was charged to report on total amount of achievements. In November 2011 a new taxation package was adopted aimed at business environment improvement. According to Tigran Sargsyan, the task is attraction of investments to Armenia. Foundation of free economic zones was to stimulate attracting private investments.

Implemented reforms brought to following results:

- Registration process of companies with typical regulations took 13–15 minutes against 20 days in the past. Non-typical regulations cases took up to 2 days.
- Liquidation of legal entities took 20 days against 30 days in the past.
- Against 50 reports in the past, companies had only 36 taxation reports to be filled. Time for taxes reports took 30 hours in case of electronic declaration and 300 hours in paper-based declaration against 1120 hours in the past.
- Number of licenses was cut to 84, adopted in complex method and 12 adopted in simplified method, against 157 complex licenses and 12 simplified licenses in the past.
- Permission for building constructions with area less than 1500 sq.m took 7 stages and 27 days against 20 stages and 137 days in the past.

=== Foreign affairs ===
Though formally the prime-minister of armenia was not responsible for the foreign policy of the country but it was a prerogative of the president under the Constitution of 2005, Tigran Sargsyan was very active in his role as an implementer of the foreign policy within his jurisdiction. He was equally warmly accepted in the US, Russia, China and the EU.

=== Fulfillments ===
Major reforms Tigran Sargsyan's government initiated were the following:

- cash machines reform,
- e-government development,
- social package launching for state servicemen,
- obligatory car insurance reform,
- several major changes in tax policy,
- foundation of 2 tax-free zones in Armenia,
- system of electronic signatures,
- North-South highway construction (unfinished)
- tax-free system for start-ups (unfinished)
- compulsory pension system (unfinished)

He was highly criticized for obligatory car insurance reform, which later became common for Armenian society. Severe protests were also organized against launching new compulsory pension funding system, which finally didn't come into force while he headed government due to his resignation in April 2014.

=== Resignation ===
Sargsyan announced resignation on 3 April 2014 but did not give a specific reason. While the deputy speaker of parliament and member of the incumbent Republican Party, Edward Sharmazanov, said that President Serzh Sargsyan accepted his resignation, he too refused to give a reason for the resignation except saying that it was a "personal decision." However, he had previously offered to resign a month earlier, but was convinced to stay on in the role by the president until a Constitutional Court ruling on his controversial pension reform plan that had been criticised.

Following months of protests, the Constitutional Court declared the mandatory part of the pension reform law to be in contravention of the Basic Law of Armenia. The measure would have required Armenians born after 1973 to contribute five percent of their monthly income to one of two private funds sanctioned by the government and the Central Bank to manage the pensions. Opponents had also cited a lack of trust in those funds and no desire to lose such a high share of their income. CC chairman Gagik Harutyunyan added that the law would be in force until the National Assembly invalidated it by 30 September. Other unnamed government officials further noted that in accordance with the ruling the law will henceforth not be complied it, though Justice Minister Hrair Tovmasyan maintained that the ruling against the compulsory element was not unconstitutional in principle, but only that a number of provisions needed to be brought in conformity with the Basic Law.

== Ambassador to the United States (2014–2016) ==
On 26 June 2014, Tigran Sargsyan was appointed as an Armenian ambassador to the United States by the decree of the Armenian President. With the same decree he received the highest diplomatic rank of the Ambassador Extraordinary and Plenipotentiary. On 15 July he began ambassadorship US Barack Obama ceremonially accepted Sargsyan's credentials. According to Armenian media, newly appointed Ambassadors are usually received by the US president not earlier than months after arriving to DC, but Sargsyan was received by Obama in two weeks after entering the US in his new capacity. Within a year of Sargsyan's ambassadorship Armenian President Sargsyan made three working visits to the USA.

As ambassador Tigran Sargsyan actively attended international forums and conferences on economic policy, Eurasian integration and cooperation issues. Under his active participation on 10 March 2015 the European Institute organized a special round-table-discussion entitled "Eurasian Economic Union: Armenia’s accession and beyond". During his speech he highlighted major principles that led Armenia join Eurasian Economic Union, mentioning 2 major factors – economic issue and political and security issue. He also mentioned Armenia needs to seek for new ways of cooperation between East and West, that is meant to be profitable for both parties. Highlighting Armenia's role in the process he claimed said he believes Armenia can become a unique bridge in the process of finding ways for that all-European economic integration. The event was attended by Tatiana Valovaya – Eurasian Economic Commission Minister of Integration and Macroeconomic Development, ambassadors of Russia and Kyrgyzstan in the US, representatives of the US State Department, diplomatic reps, members of social and political circles.

In 2015 he attended Astana Economic Forum on 20–22 May 2015 and St. Petersburg International Economic Forum in 2015. At Saint Petersburg forum he stressed principal importance of macro economic coordination in framework of Eurasian Economic Union, importance to follow those indicators for predicting the situation firstly for businesses. The proposal was included in list of key moments of the forum.

During Tigran Sargsyan ambassadorship period three working visits of Armenia president were organized to the United States – in September 2014, May 2015 and September 2015.

On 12 January 2016, Tigran Sargsyan was dismissed from position of Ambassador in US and moved to another position – chairman of the board of the Eurasian Economic Commission. On 27 January farewell event was held attended by Peter A. Selfridge – Chief of Protocol of the United States, former US Ambassadors to Armenia John A. Heffern, Marie L. Yovanovitch, John Marshall Evans, other high-ranked officials. On 12 January 2016, Grigor Hovhannissian replaced him as Armenia's Ambassador to the United States.

== Head of the Eurasian Economic Commission (2016–2020) ==
On 16 October 2015 Summit of Eurasian Economic Commission in Kazakhstan attended by heads of state-members Tigran Sargsyan was presented as next chairman of the Commission to occupy the position on 1 February 2016. Presenting him Belarus President Aleksander Lukashenko stated: "His candidature is approved by Russia president, he worked with him. He's known as very experienced, progressive specialist".

On 1 February Tigran Sargsyan headed the new Eurasian Economic Commission. Number of commission staff became 10. Trade Minister Andrey Slepnev was substituted by Russia's Veronica Nikishina. A new position was launched – board member (minister) on internal markets, informatization, information-communication technologies, which was occupied by Armenia's Karine Minasyan.

== Accusations by "the failed deadbeat" ==
Since 2016 public statements were made by Ashot Grigoryan, head of "EU-ASIA Business Finance Centre" firm (registered in Slovakia), against Tigran Sargsyan, accusing him of stealing $300 mln from Nairit Plant. He claimed readiness to invest huge sums in Nairit, but faces obstacles by acting government. In response to the statements, Tigran Sargsyan filed a lawsuit against Grigoryan and a number of news agencies, demanding a refutation.

In August 2018 Ashot Grigoryan signed Memorandum of understanding with Artsvik Minasyan, then minister of Economy of Armenia, ahead of promised investments.

In October 2018 24news.am news agency published journalist investigation, revealing fact that companies belonging to Grigoryan, including the "EU-ASIA Business Finance Centre", had no turnover the years prior to that, and banking accounts were empty. Companies were registered using fictive locations in Slovakia. Ashot Grigoryan had a 50 thousand Euro outstanding dept to the Slovakia government. Also a fact was revealed that Ashot Grigoryan claimed to have a scientific "Doktor nauk" degree and was a professor at Yerevan State University. While the university officially refuted he was teaching there. Also, the fact of the scientific degree was refuted. Grigoryan appeared to use stickers on his car, commonly used by diplomatic mission reps, while not being a diplomat. Following the publication, Grigoryan filled lawsuits against the news agency, against Armenia Ministry of Foreign Affairs and Tigran Seyranyan, then ambassador of Armenia to the Czech Republic and Slovakia.

On 15 April 2019, Varag Siseryan, head of staff of the deputy Prime-Minister of Armenia, who held talks with Ashot Grigoryan prior to that, declared that Grigoryan is just "a failed deadbeat", presenting details of manipulations and causes of the impossibility of any investments by that person.

On 14 May 2019, after two years of litigation, the General Court satisfied the lawsuit of Tigran Sargsyan and ordered Ashot Grigoryan to publish a refutation of the false charges, as well as pay 1 million dram fine. The court also ordered news agencies once publishing Grigoryan's statements, to publish the refutation.

Tigran Sargsyan also filed a second lawsuit against Ashot Grigoryan. On 22 February 2022, the court issued a verdict obliging Grigoryan to deny his statements related to the "Nairit" factory, and also found that the information given by Ashot Grigoryan about placing money on Tigran Sargsyan's offshore companies and engaging in money laundering are untrue.

== Personal life ==
Sargsyan is married and has three children: daughter – Narine, two sons – Abgar and Markos and three grandchildren.

Political offices
Preceded by Serzh Sargsyan	Prime Minister of Armenia; 2008–2014	Succeeded by Hovik Abrahamyan
