= Byblos Bank Armenia =

Bank in Armenia

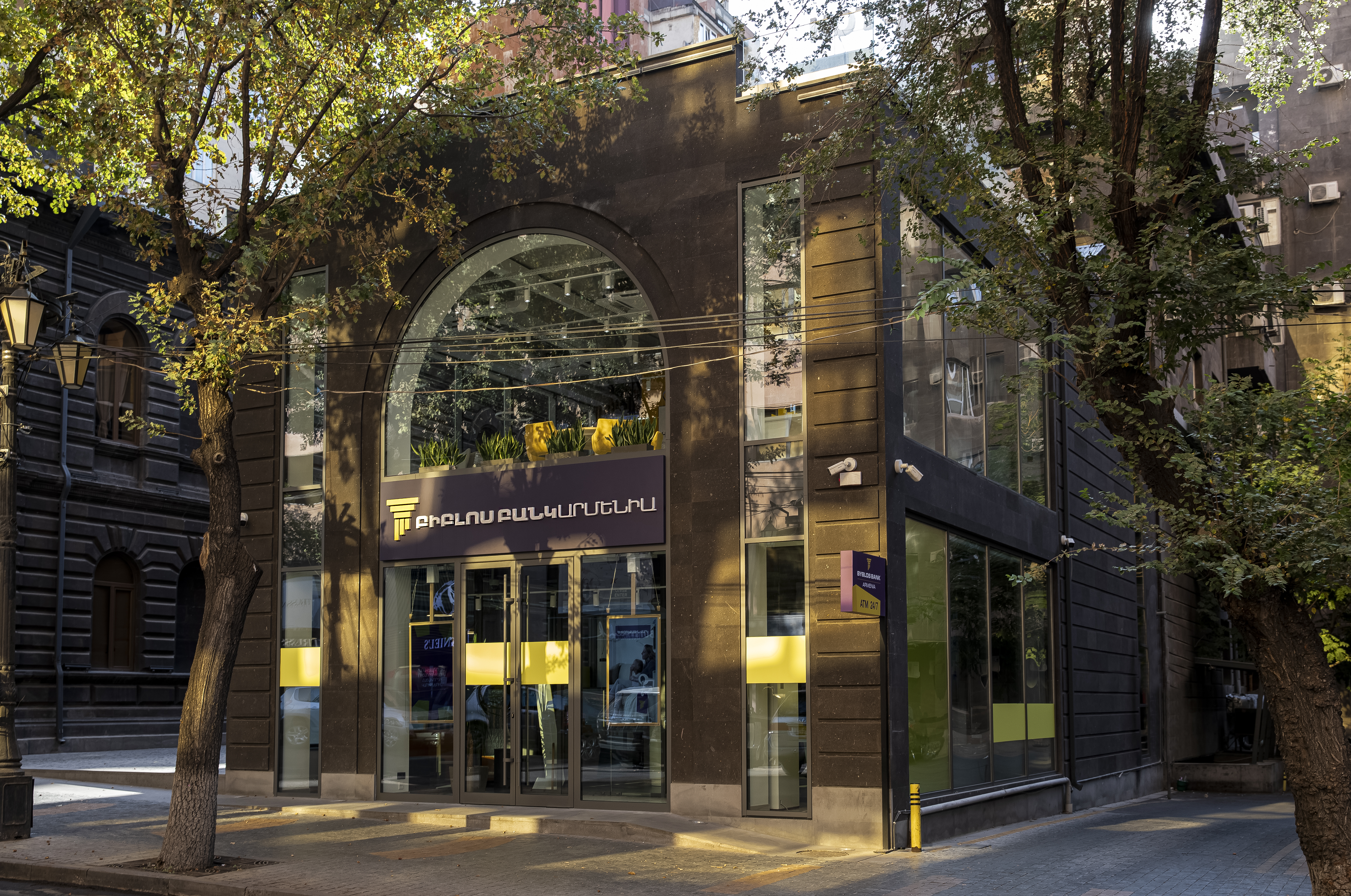
- Byblos Bank Armenia branch in Yerevan from 2021
- Company type: Closed joint-stock company (CJSC)
- Industry: Financial services
- Predecessor: International Trade Bank
- Founded: 2007; 18 years ago in Yerevan, Armenia
- Headquarters: Yerevan, Armenia
- Area served: Armenia
- Key people: Hayk Stepanyan, CEO
- Products: Business banking, banking services
- Parent: Byblos Bank
- Website: byblosbankarmenia.am

Byblos Bank Armenia is an Armenian bank headquartered in Yerevan, offering banking services at four branches across the city. The Bank is a wholly owned subsidiary of the Lebanese Byblos Bank. It is one of 18 banks in Armenia supervised by the Central Bank of Armenia.

== History ==
Founded in December 2007, Byblos Bank Armenia CJSC is the outcome of the acquisition of the International Trade Bank in Armenia by Byblos Bank S.A.L.

Byblos Bank Armenia began operations with one branch in early 2008, then went on to open three more in 2012, 2020 and 2021.

In 2008, the European Bank for Reconstruction and Development (EBRD) and the OPEC Fund for International Development (OFID) bought 25% and 10% respectively of the shares of the bank.

By the end of 2016, Byblos Bank S.A.L. had re-acquired all of EBRD and OFID's shares in Byblos Bank Armenia's charter capital (262,491 shares in total).

== Services ==
The core business activity of the Bank includes the attraction of deposits, customer account maintenance, consumer and corporate lending, cash and settlement transactions and operations with securities and foreign exchange.

== Registered Capital ==
The registered capital of the Bank makes up 26,249,100,000 Armenian drams. The Bank's charter capital consists of 262,491 ordinary registered shares, each with a par value of 100,000 Armenian drams.

== See also ==
- Economy of Armenia
- List of banks in Armenia
- Currency of Armenia
- Byblos Bank S.A.L.
