= Unibank =

Unibank is the name of several banks:

- Unibank (Armenia)
- Unibank (Azerbaijan)
- Unibank (Denmark)
- UniBank (Ghana)
- Unibank (Haiti)
- Unibanka (Latvia)
- Unibank (Moldova)
- Unibank (Panama)
- BDO Unibank (Philippines)
- UniBank (United States)
