= List of banks in Armenia =

Banks in Armenia

This is a list of banks in Armenia.

== Central bank ==
- Central Bank of Armenia

== Commercial banks ==
As of 4 November 2024, there are 18 commercial banks operating in Armenia. This includes:

Rank	Name	Founded	HQ	# branches	# employees	Assets Dec 2017 million AMD	Assets Dec 2017 million USD	SWIFT
1	"Ameriabank" CJSC	1910	Yerevan	14	695	677,722	1,400	ARMIAM22
2	"AMIO BANK" CJSC	1991	Yerevan	53	898	574,944	1,188	ARMNAM22
3	"Ardshinbank" CJSC	2003	Yerevan	64	1,154	568,273	1,174	ASHBAM22
4	"Acba bank" OJSC	1996	Yerevan	58	1,348	311,023	642	AGCAAM22
5	"Inecobank" CJSC	1996	Yerevan	26	950	277,842	574	INJSAM22
6	"Converse Bank Corp"	1993	Yerevan	31	710	252,736	522	COVBAM22
7	"VTB Bank Armenia" CJSC	1993	Yerevan	67	1,201	216,060	446	ARMJAM22
8	"ARARATBANK" OJSC	2004	Yerevan	61	884	212,602	439	ARMCAM22
10	"UniBank" OJSC	2001	Yerevan	45	785	203,221	420	UNIJAM22
11	"ARMECONOMBANK" OJSC	1991	Yerevan	50	872	190,803	394	ARECAM22
12	"ArmSwissBank" CJSC (not retail banking)	2004	Yerevan	1	110	162,020	335	ARSJAM22
13	"ArtsakhBank" CJSC	1996	Yerevan	23	492	137,339	284	ARTSAM22
14	"ID Bank" CJSC	1990	Yerevan	14	405	131,931	273	ANIKAM22
15	"EVOCABANK" CJSC	1990	Yerevan	11	254	105,532	218	PRMLAM22
16	"Byblos Bank Armenia" CJSC	1992	Yerevan	2	80	85,120	176	AEIEUS33
17	"Mellat Bank" CJSC	1995	Yerevan	1	51	46,266	96	BKMTAM22
18	Fast Bank	2022	Yerevan	35	1000	30,100	78	FCAOAM22
-	Summary	-	-	525	11,175	4,362,083	9,010	-

- Ameriabank opened in 1910 as the Yerevan branch of the Caucasus Trade Bank.
- Ardshinbank opened in 2003. Initially incorporated as Ardshininvestbank, the bank was renamed Ardshinbank in November 2014.
- Acba bank was established in 1996, within TACIS program of the European Union
- Inecobank established in 1996.
- Araratbank was established through the reorganization of Haykap Bank operating in the Armenian financial market since 1991.
- Unibank was founded in 2001.
- Armeconombank(AEB) opened in 1991.
- Armswissbank opened in 2005.
- ID Bank opened in 1996 as "Aneliq Bank" LLC, incorporated into "ID Bank" CJSC in 2018.
- Artsakhbank was established in 1996.
- Mellat Bank was founded in 1992.
- Fast Bank founded in 1994 as "Fast Credit" LLC. Incorporated into "Fast Bank" in 2002.
- Armbusinessbank opened in 1994 as the legal successor of the "Arminvestbank" operating since 1991. It was re-branded in 2023 as Amio Bank.
- Byblos Bank Armenia opened in 2000 as the legal successor of the "International Trade Bank" operating since 1992.
- Converse Bank, opened in 1993 as "North Armenian Shareholding Bank", incorporated into Converse Bank in 1997.
- Evocabank opened in 1990 as Prometheus Bank, and renamed in 2001 as Prometey Bank. It was re-branded in 2017 as Evocabank.
- HSBC Bank Armenia, opened in 1996 as "Midland Armenia Bank", incorporated into HSBC Bank Armenia in 1999. HSBC Bank Armenia was acquired by Ardshinbank on November 29, 2024
- VTB Armenia, opened in 1993 as the "ArmSavingsBank", incorporated into VTB Armenia in 2006.

=== Rankings ===
Armenia-based commercial banks earned a total of 20.1 billion drams in net profit in the first quarter of 2018, up from 10.7 billion drams they had earned in the same period last year. The growth was 87.2%. All 17 banks closed the first quarter with a profit. The top five banks in terms of net profit growth were Artsakhbank, Ameriabank, Ardshinbank, Acba bank and Inecobank.

Ameriabank was leading by size of assets by the end of 2017. The top five largest banks in terms of assets were Ameriabank, Armbusinessbank, Ardshinbank, Acba bank and Inecobank, which accounted for 55.8% of all assets.

Out of 17 banks 15 were profitable in 2017. The top five banks by size of net profit were Ameriabank, Inecobank, Ardshinbank, Acba bank and IDBank. Ameriabank was the most profitable bank posting a total of 7.6 billion drams of net profit, an increase of 23.89% over the previous year.

According to data from first 3 quarters of 2017 the five leading banks in terms of mortgage portfolios are Ardshinbank, Converse Bank, Ameriabank, Araratbank and HSBC Bank Armenia, which account for 53.2% of the total mortgage lending.

=== Ratings ===
Fitch Ratings' bank sector outlook for Armenia in 2018 remains stable.

== Development banks/representative offices ==
Below is a list of regional and international banks which have operations in Armenia:

- Asian Development Bank, regional development bank representative office in Armenia opened in 2005.
- Interstate Bank, regional development bank representative office in Armenia opened in 1994.
- Rosselkhozbank, special state agricultural bank of Russia representative office in Armenia opened in 2012.
- Panarmenian Bank, enterprise development bank opened in 2008. Was reorganized into a fund in August 2018.
- Armenia is a member of the European Bank for Reconstruction and Development, the EBRD maintains a representative office in Yerevan.
- The Eurasian Development Bank maintains a representative office in Yerevan, Armenia is a full member.
- The World Bank maintains a representative office in Yerevan, Armenia is a full member of the World Bank.
- Armenia is a member of the International Monetary Fund, the IMF maintains a representative office in Yerevan.
- The International Bank for Reconstruction and Development maintains a representative office in Yerevan.
- Armenia is a founding member of the Black Sea Trade and Development Bank.
- As of 2018, Armenia is a regional member of the Asian Infrastructure Investment Bank.

== Former commercial banks ==
- Armenian Development Bank, merged with Araratbank.
- AreximBank-Gazprombank, acquired by Ardshinbank.
- Cascade Bank, merged with Ameriabank.
- BTA Bank, merged with ArmEconomBank.
- ProCredit Bank, acquired by Inecobank.

== See also ==
- Armenia Securities Exchange
- Central Depository of Armenia
- Economy of Armenia
- List of banks in Europe
