= Central Depository of Armenia =

Securities market

- Abbreviation: CDA
- Formation: October 1996; 29 years ago
- Type: Securities market institution
- Headquarters: Yerevan
- Region served: International
- Owner: Armenia Stock Exchange
- Chief Executive Officer: Vahan Stepanyan
- Main organ: Supervisory Board
- Website: cda.am

The Central Depository of Armenia (CDA) (Armenian: Հայաստանի կենտրոնական դեպոզիտարիա, romanized: Hayastani kentronakan depozitaria) is the Central Depository of Armenia, established in 1996. The CDA is one of the oldest securities market institutions in the country and is headquartered in Yerevan. The Central Bank of Armenia is the regulatory body of the CDA. The CDA is a full member of the Federation of Euro-Asian Stock Exchanges.

== History ==
The Central Depository of Armenia was founded on 1 October 1996, it was originally called the "National Centralized Register" and was renamed to the Central Depository of Armenia in April 1999. In August 2000, the CDA became a full member of the International Association of Exchanges, which includes 20 member organizations from CIS member states.

In November 2007, the Swedish exchange operator OMX and the Central Bank of Armenia concluded an agreement acquiring shares of the CDA and the Armenia Stock Exchange. In 2008, the American Nasdaq, Inc. acquired the CDA. In January 2008, negotiations were finalized and the CDA was fully owned by Nasdaq, Inc. OMX Group.

In June 2009, the CDA became a partner member of the Association of National Numbering Agencies (ANNA). In 2014, the CDA became a full member of ANNA.

In 2009, the Armenia Stock Exchange acquired full ownership of the CDA.

In December 2010, the CDA joined the SWIFT international system. In 2011, the CDA signed a cooperation agreement with the National Settlement Depository of Russia. Also in 2011, the CDA organized a joint conference between the European Central Securities Depositories Association and the International Association of Exchanges of CIS countries. It was the first joint event of the two regional stock exchanges and depositaries associations and was held in Yerevan.

In July 2016, Clearstream opened a direct link to the Armenian market, with Armenia becoming the 56th domestic market link. The company stated that this expansion was an important milestone for the Caucasus region.

In 2016, the CDA signed a cooperation agreement with the Central Depository of Belarus. In 2019, the CDA signed a memorandum of understanding with the Central Depository of Kyrgyzstan.

In 2019, the Armenia Stock Exchange and the Central depository of Armenia achieved ISO 9001:2015 and ISO/IEC 27001:2013 certification. In 2022, the Armenia Stock Exchange and the Central Depository of Armenia successfully completed the ISO 27001 and ISO 9001 recertification.

In September 2020, the International Conference of the Association of Eurasian Central Securities Depositories was held in Yerevan.

In June 2021, the Central Depository of Armenia launched the "CDA Online application", making depository services available to investors online. In August 2021, via the CDA Online application, the first shareholders' meeting and e-voting of Acba Bank took place.

In December 2021, the CDA signed a memorandum of cooperation with the National Depository of Ukraine.

== Services ==
The CDA offers shareholders with register keeping services to joint stock companies, in addition to securities account opening and maintenance services to both corporate and individual clients. The CDA's primary objective is to be an efficient clearing and settlement house through the implementation of international best practices within the Armenian market and to provide cross-border financial services, acting as a gateway among regional economies.

== Leadership ==
Vahan Stepanyan has been the chief executive officer of the CDA since April 2006.

== See also ==
- Economy of Armenia
- Government of Armenia
- List of banks in Armenia
- List of companies of Armenia
- National numbering agency
- Open joint-stock company
