= Martin Galstyan =

5th Chairman of the Central Bank of Armenia
- Incumbent
- Assumed office 2020
- Preceded by: Arthur Javadyan

Personal details
- Born: 4 May 1978 Yerevan, Soviet Union
- Education: Yerevan State University (BA, MA); Harvard Kennedy School (MPA)

Martin Galstyan (4 May 1978 in Yerevan) is an Armenia economist. He is the currently chair of the Central Bank of Armenia, a position he has held since 2020. He also teaches classes at the American University of Armenia.
