= Evocabank =

Armenian commercial bank

EVOCABANK
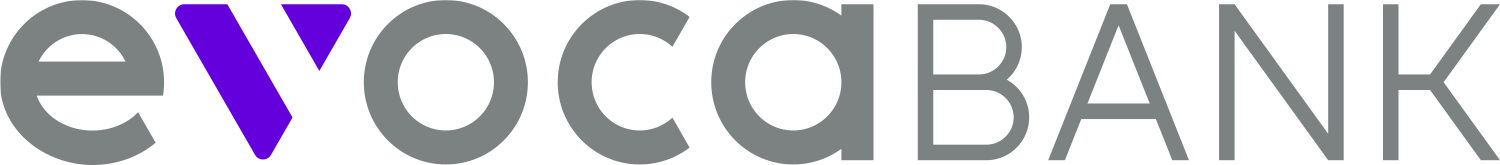

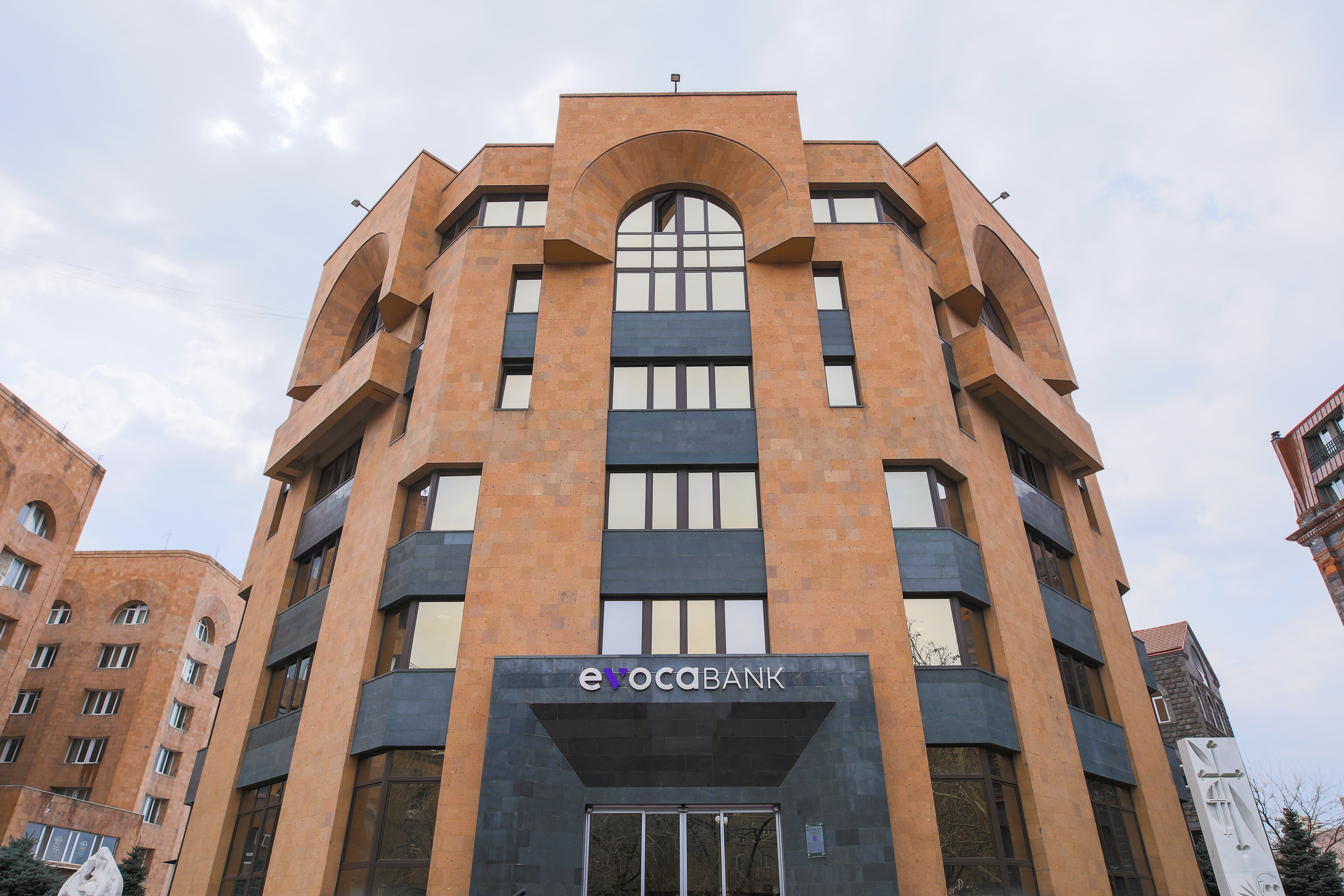
- Evocabank's headquarters in Yerevan, Armenia.
- Type: Opened joint-stock company
- Industry: Banking, Financial services
- Founded: 1990; 36 years ago, Yerevan, Armenia
- Headquarters: Yerevan, Armenia
- Key people: Karen Yeghiazaryan (Chairman of the Management Board)
- Services: Credit cards, Time deposits, retail banking, commercial bank, mortgage loans
- Owner: Mareta Gevorkyan (100%)
- Number of employees: 530 (2025)
- Website: www.evoca.am

Evocabank is an Armenian commercial bank with headquarters in Yerevan.

As of 17 January 2023, Mareta Gevorkyan owns 100% of the ordinary shares, as well as 100% of preferred shares issued in 2016, 99.9% of preferred shares issued in 2020 and 100% of preferred shares issued in 2022.

== History ==
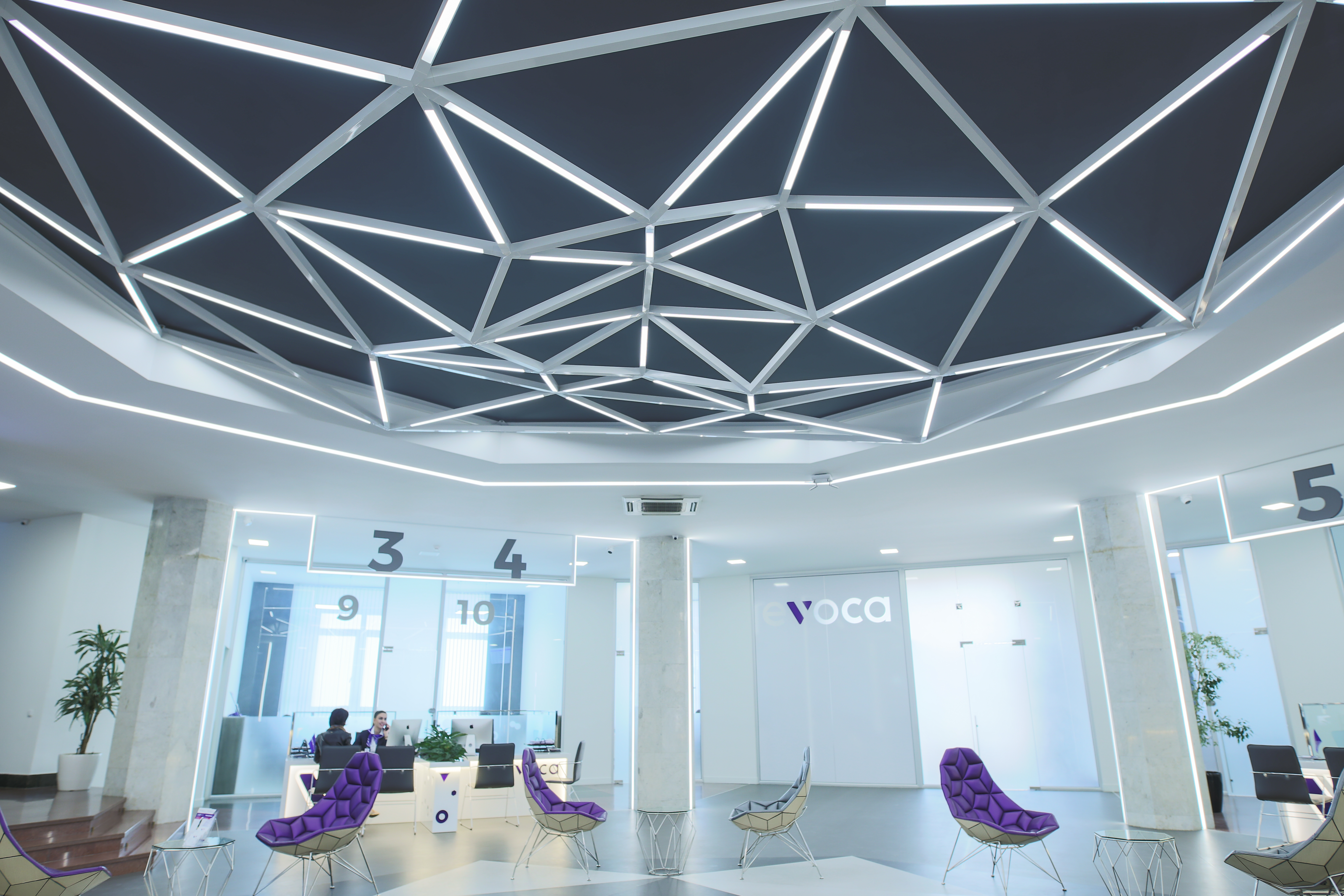
Head office of Evocabank

- 1990: The bank was founded.
- 2000: Accessed the S.W.I.F.T. system.
- 2005: Became a shareholder of "Armenian Card" CJSC, and a full member of "ArCa" payment system.
- 2006: The bank was granted the status of an affiliated member of the "MasterCard Europe" system. The bank started issuing "Maestro", "MasterCard Standard", "MasterCard Gold", "MasterCard Business" banking cards.
- 2008: The bank issued its own bonds which were privately placed.
- 2017: The bank has been renamed to Evocabank, changing its strategy and business model, and moving to mobile-first format. Joined in VISA payment system. Introduced SingleTOUCH online loan.
- 2019:Evocabank Board Deputy Chairman Karen Yeghiazaryan has been appointed chairman of the board. Visa Infinite card has been presented. Bank became the general sponsor of Eurovision 2019 broadcasting.
- 2022: Evocabank share capital increased by AMD 3 Billion. The Bank issued bonds. Evocabank introduced its new Visa Vision card. Bank started new collaboration with HayPost on delivering fintech services.
- 2024: Evocabank acquired new international partners, including EIB Global, IFC, Al Fardan Exchange.
- 2025: The Bank changed its legal form, reorganising from a CJSC into an OJSC. Evocabank and the EBRD signed a cooperation agreement. The Bank introduced the new Evoca Travel Card. The Evoca Partners Club and Evoca Benefits projects were launched.

== Branches ==
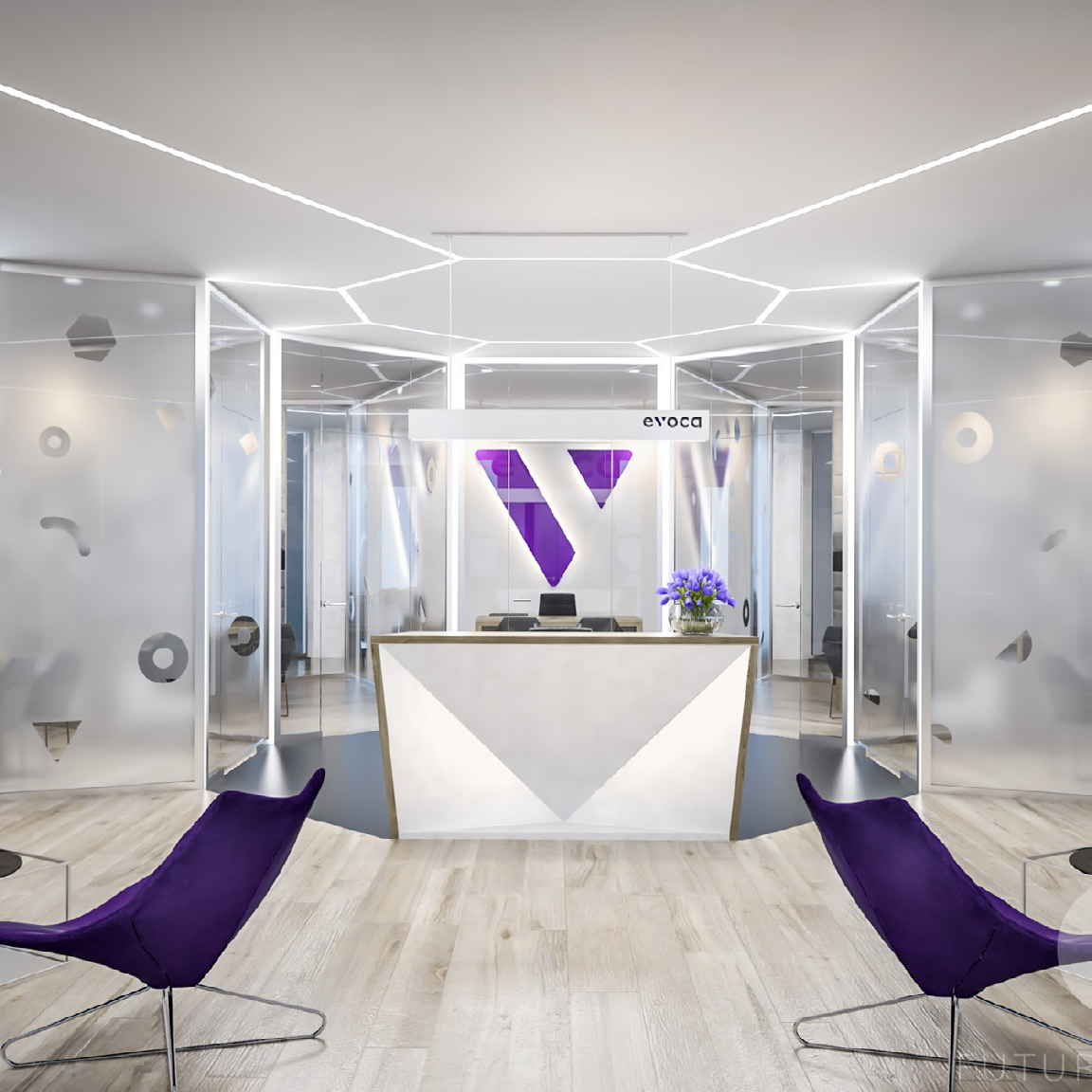
Evocabank HQ.

Yerevan, Armenia

- "Head office": 44/2 Hanrapetutyan
- "Evoca Premium Branch": Zakyan 10
- "Paronyan" branch: 15/3 Paronyan Street
- "Kasyan" branch: Vazgen the First Vehapar Street, 5
- "Tumanyan" branch: 15 Tumanyan Street
- "Azatutyan 12" branch: 12 Liberty Avenue
- "Garegin Nzhdeh" branch: 9 Garegin Nzhdeh Street
- "Davtashen" branch: 32/8 Tigran Petrosyan Street
- "Erebuni" branch: 76 Gajegortsneri Street
- "Kievyan" branch: 11a Kievyan Street
- "Malatia" branch: 134/8 Zoravar Andraniki Street
- "Nor Nork" branch: 14/9 Gai Avenue.
- "Yerevan Mall" branch: 34 Arshakunyats Avenue.
- "Hanrapetutyun" branch: Hanrapetutyun 59.
- "Ajapnyak" branch: Abelyan 2/1 Street.

Abovyan, Armenia

- "Kotayk" branch: 1/2 Ogostosi 23 Street.

Gyumri, Armenia

- "Gyumri" branch: 63/1 Rustaveli Street.

Vanadzor, Armenia

- "Vanadzor" branch: 34 Gr. Lusavorich Street.

Tavush, Armenia

- "Dilijan" branch: 74 Myasnikyan Street.

== See also ==
- Economy of Armenia
- List of banks in Armenia
