= Acba Bank =

Bank in Armenia for agriculture financing

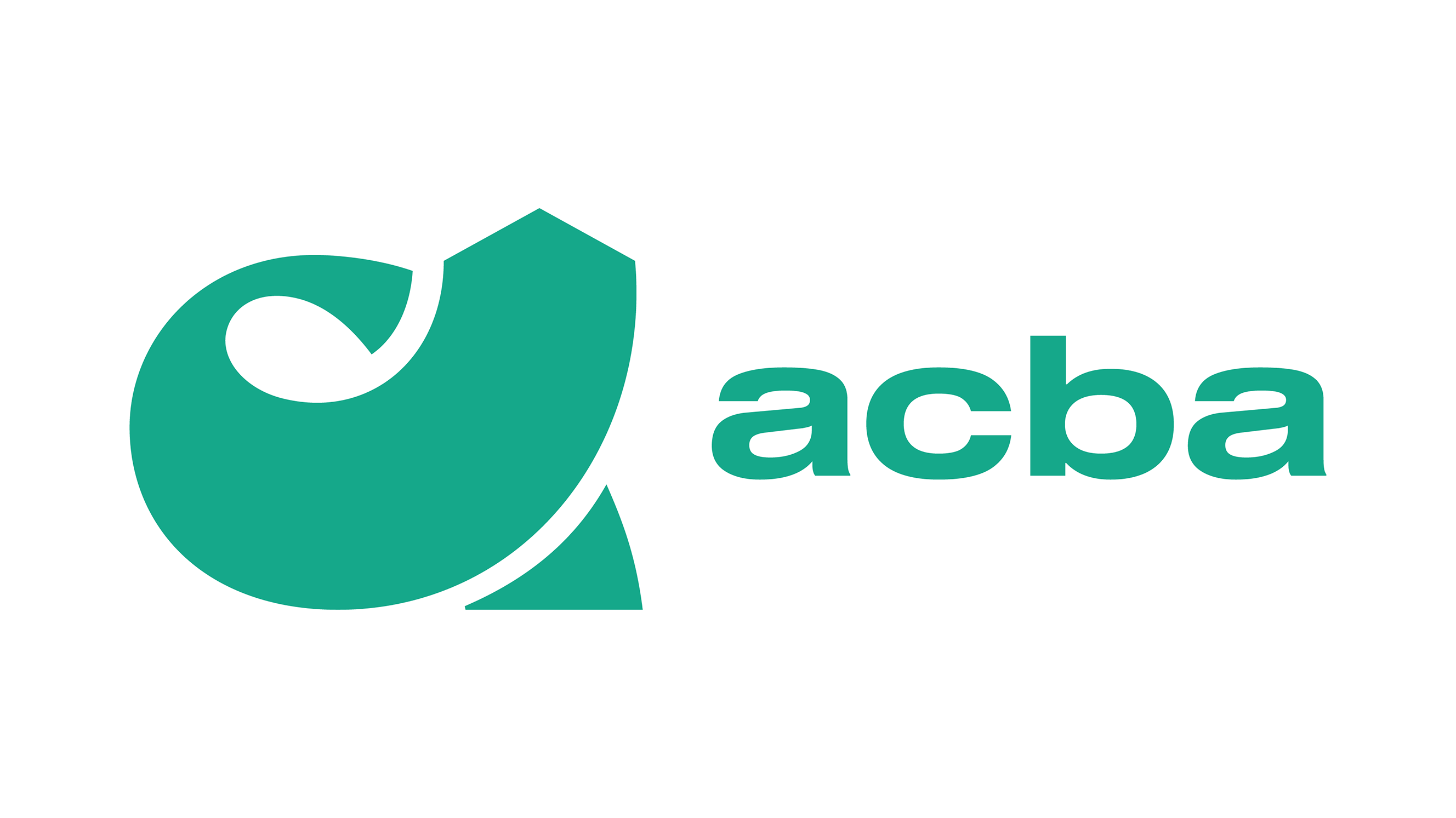
- Company type: OJSC
- Traded as: AMX: ACBA
- Industry: Banking, financial services
- Founded: 1996
- Headquarters: Yerevan, Armenia
- Number of locations: 65 branches (2025)
- Key people: Hakob Andreasyan (CEO)
- Products: Credit cards, consumer banking, corporate banking, investment banking, mortgage loans
- Total assets: ▲AMD 900,258 mln. (2017)
- Owners: Sacam International SJSC (5%); "ACBA FEDERATION" CJSC (95%)
- Number of employees: 1501 (2018)
- Website: www.acba.am

The Acba bank was established in 1996, within TACIS program of the European Union. It is the biggest bank in Armenia for agriculture financing, especially in rural areas. It has 65 branches countrywide and had its IPO in 2021.

In late 2025 they received a US$ 40 million lend by EBRD for youth-led firms in Armenia

== See also ==
- Armenian dram
- Economy of Armenia
- List of banks in Armenia
