= Unibank (Armenia) =

Armenian bank

- Type: CJSC
- Industry: Banking, Financial services
- Founded: 2001; 25 years ago
- Headquarters: Yerevan, Armenia
- Products: Credit cards, consumer banking, corporate banking, investment banking, mortgage loans, private banking, wealth management
- Total assets: ▲AMD 203,221 mln. (Dec 2017)
- Number of employees: 785 (as of Dec 2017)
- Website: unibank.am

Unibank is an Armenian universal bank offering retail banking services and is headquartered in Yerevan, Armenia.

The bank started operating in 2001. It is headed by Mesrop Hakobyan.

== See also ==
- Economy of Armenia
- List of banks
- List of banks in Armenia
