= Armenian Card =

ArCa (Armenian Card) ԱրՔա (Արմենիան Քարդ)
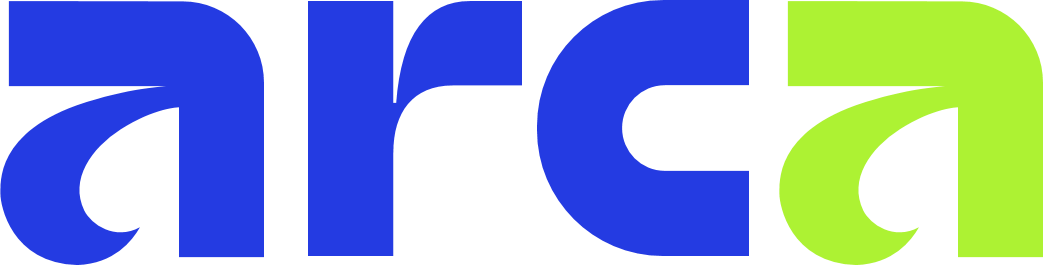
- Company type: Private
- Industry: Financial services
- Founded: 2000
- Headquarters: Yerevan, Armenia
- Area served: Armenia
- Products: Debit cards, payment systems

Armenian Card (Armenian: Արմենիան Քարդ), stylised as ArCa (Armenian: ԱրՔա), is an Armenian payment processor and card issuer.

== History ==
"Armenian Card" CJSC was founded in March 2000 by the Central Bank of Armenia and ten commercial banks, with the support of USAID, in order to introduce and develop a new payment accounting system in the banking sector of Armenia.։
