= Armenia Stock Exchange =

Stock exchange in Yerevan, Armenia

- Type: Joint Stock Company
- Industry: Stock exchange
- Founded: 2001, demutualized in 2007
- Headquarters: Yerevan, Armenia
- Key people: Hayk Yeganyan, CEO
- Products: listing, organized market to trade stocks, corporate and Government bonds, foreign currency
- Parent: Warsaw Stock Exchange (72.22%)
- Website: amx.am

The Armenia Stock Exchange (AMX; Armenian: Հայաստանի ֆոնդային բորսա, romanized: Hayastani fondayin borsa), formerly known as NASDAQ OMX Armenia and the Armenia Securities Exchange, is the only stock exchange currently operating in Armenia. It is located in Yerevan, the capital city. The state regulatory authority for the stock exchange and the Armenian securities market is the Central Bank of Armenia (CBA). Instruments currently traded on AMX include stocks, corporate bonds, government bonds, currency, SWAP and REPO (repurchase agreements) on corporate securities.

== History ==
Since 1995, the Armenia Stock Exchange has been a member of the Federation of Euro-Asian Stock Exchanges. The headquarters of the Federation is located in Yerevan.

The stock exchange began operations in 2001 as a self-regulatory organization founded by the exchange members. In November 2007, pursuant to relevant amendments in the legislation covering the local securities market, it was demutualized and became an open joint-stock company. On 21 November 2007, 100% of the stock exchange's shares were purchased by the Nordic exchange operator OMX. In March 2008, after the merger of NASDAQ and OMX Group was completed, Armenian Stock Exchange, as well as the Central Depository of Armenia, became part of the NASDAQ OMX Group. On 27 January 2009, the Armenian Stock Exchange was officially renamed NASDAQ OMX Armenia. NASDAQ sold the exchange to the Central Bank of Armenia in 2018, and on 18 January 2019, it was renamed Armenia Securities Exchange (AMX).

In December 2019, the exchange became a partner member of the Sustainable Stock Exchanges Initiative.

In September 2020, it was announced that the Warsaw Stock Exchange is interested to acquire 65% of AMX shares. On 24 May 2022, the Central Bank of Armenia approved the acquiring of 65.03% of shares of the Armenian Stock Exchange by the Warsaw Stock Exchange.

== Management ==
The Armenia Stock Exchange is operated by a supervisory board, as well as a local management team. The management team consists of Hayk Yeganyan, CEO, Mikayel Hayrapetyan, chief financial officer.

== The Funded Pension System ==
Starting on 1 January 2014, the Armenian Government initiated a new statewide pension program which forces all employees born after 1974 to set aside 5 percent of their total yearly salary into private pension funds. According to the new legislation, the Government of Armenia made an agreement with the Central Depository of Armenia and AMX (Armenia Securities Exchange) to allow these organizations to be responsible for the registry of the mandatory participants of this new pension system, meaning these organizations are responsible for collecting and properly allocating the assets that are set aside for these pension programs.

Since the new pension system was introduced, AMX has seen a large influx of activity on the premise that more money will enter the market once the inflow of pension fund money has been realized.

== See also ==
- Central Bank of Armenia
- Economy of Armenia
- Federation of Euro-Asian Stock Exchanges
- List of banks in Armenia
- List of European stock exchanges
- List of stock exchanges
