= Central Bank of Armenia =

State-owned bank in Armenia

Central Bank of Armenia Հայաստանի Կենտրոնական Բանկ
- Logo

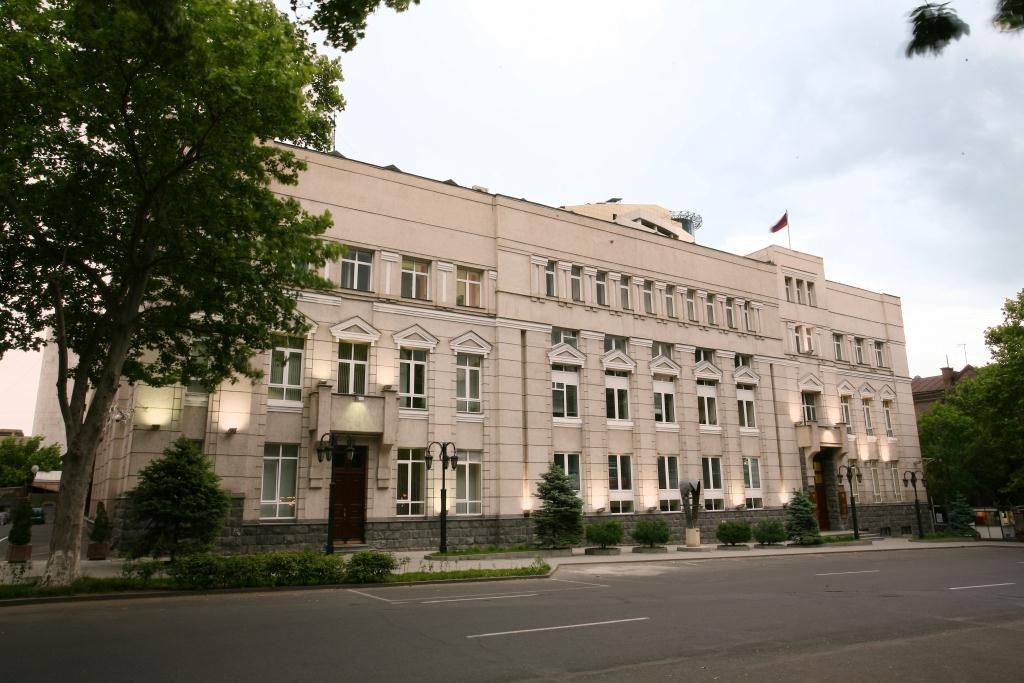
- Headquarters
- Central bank of: Armenia
- Headquarters: Yerevan
- Coordinates: 40°10′33″N 44°30′38″E
- Established: December 1991; 34 years ago
- Ownership: 100% state ownership
- Governor: Martin Galstyan
- Currency: Armenian dram AMD (ISO 4217)
- Reserves: 1 770 million USD
- Preceded by: National Bank of Armenia (1991–1993)
- Website: cba.am

The Central Bank of Armenia (Armenian: Հայաստանի Կենտրոնական Բանկ, romanized: Hayastani Kentronakan Bank) is the central bank of Armenia with its headquarters in Yerevan. The CBA is an independent institution responsible for issuing all banknotes and coins in the country, overseeing and regulating the banking sector and keeping the government's currency reserves. The CBA is also the sole owner of the Armenian Mint.

The bank is engaged in policies to promote financial inclusion and is a member of the Alliance for Financial Inclusion.

On July 3, 2012, the Central Bank of Armenia announced it would be making specific commitments to financial inclusion under the Maya Declaration.

On September 28, 2012, at the Global Policy Forum 2012, the bank made an additional commitment under the Maya Declaration to encourage the rollout of private sector products that respond to the needs of the poor, with an emphasis on innovative channels, such as mobile and electronic money. And to also implement a swift, effective, and free complaint-handling system through the financial mediator office, and improve the regulatory framework so that consumers have the information, protection, and ability to access all services.

The current governor of the CBA is Martin Galstyan.

== Purpose ==
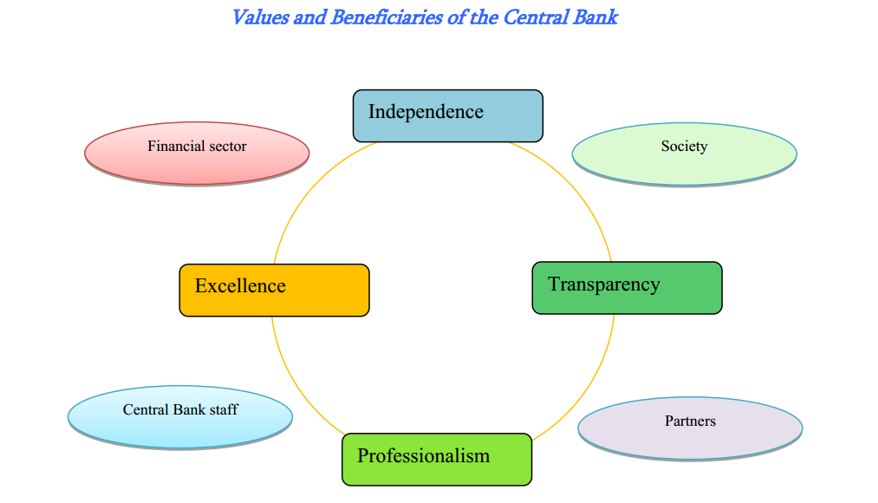
Values and beneficiaries of the Central Bank

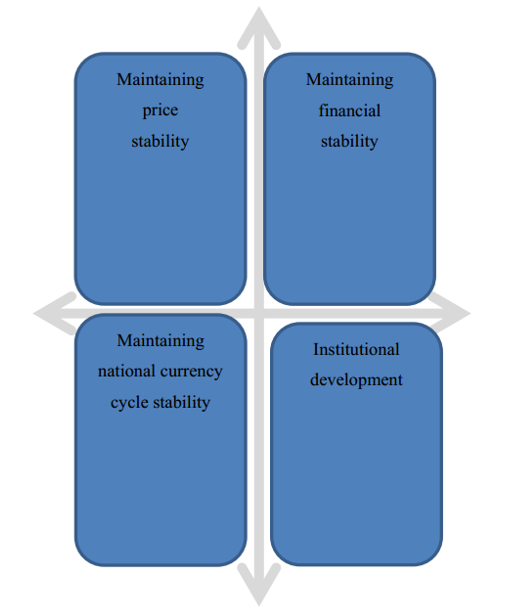
Directions of strategic developments of the Central Bank

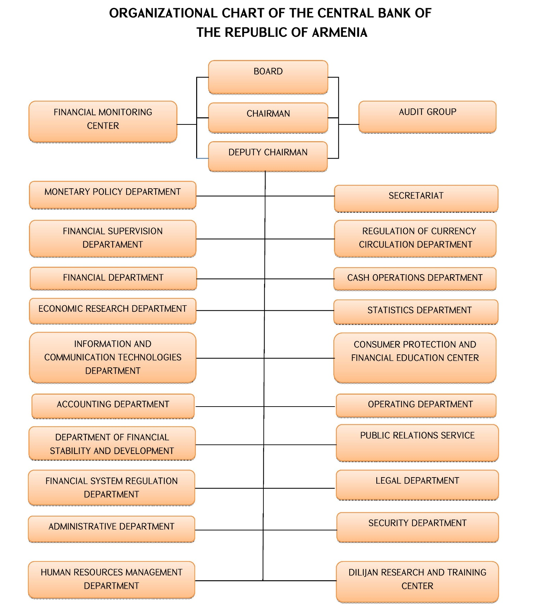
Organizational chart of the Central Bank of Armenia

=== Mission of the Central Bank ===
- to be a prestigious, transparent, independent, knowledge-based and effective entity that understands and appreciates development trends in the international financial community
- to maintain institutional capacities in order to promptly respond to changes in the economic landscape and effectively influence economic processes
- to always support a sustainable macroeconomic development of Armenia while remaining a key partner to the Government in facing economic challenges.

=== Key tasks of the Central Bank ===
- to maintain stability of the financial sector
- to provide issuance of national currency and ensure the cycle of it
- to combat money laundering and terrorism financing
- to manage international reserves of Armenia
- to regulate and oversee other areas of competence as provided under the Armenian constitution and laws.

== Structure ==
=== CBA Management ===
The Central Bank Board is the highest body of the management of the Central Bank. The Central Bank Board consists of the chairman, his two deputies and 5 members of the board. The Chairman of the Central Bank and Deputy Chairmen of the Central Bank are included in the Central Bank Board according to position. The Chairman of the Central Bank is the highest official of the Central Bank. The Chairman is responsible for the fulfillment of the objectives set by this law. In the absence of the Chairman or if he is incapable of performing his duties, he is substituted by one of his deputies, and in case of absence, or impossibility to govern by the deputies, the eldest member of the Central Bank Board shall act in his place. The Chairman is appointed by the National Assembly, at the presentation by the President, for a period of 6 years, and The Deputy Chairmen are appointed by the President, for a period of 6 years. The Central Bank Board members are appointed by the President of Armenia for a period of 5 years. Members of the Central Bank Board cannot hold any other paid position in the Central Bank. The Chairman of the Central Bank coordinates and ensures the work of the Central Bank, represents the Central Bank in the Republic and abroad, as well as in international organizations, implements other rights assigned exclusively to the Central Bank Board. The Chairman, his deputies as well as Board Members cannot be members in management of any party, may not hold another state title, or perform other payable work, except for the scientific research, pedagogical and creative activities.

== Maintaining financial stability ==
Main body responsible for financial stability in Armenia is the Central Bank, as provided for by the Republic of Armenia Law “On Central Bank”. One of the CBA's objectives is maintaining the stability and appropriate functioning of the financial system of Armenia, including providing the stability, liquidity, solvency and appropriate functioning of the banking system. Central Bank of Armenia implements the above-mentioned task through its efforts of risk assessment and risk reduction, financial system regulation and supervision functions, payment system oversight and, in exceptional circumstances, by acting as lender of last resort, and resolution work to deal with distressed banks.

=== Introduction to financial stability ===
The Central Bank of Armenia defines financial stability as a condition where financial system is able to withstand shocks and disruptions so that the system maintains a sufficient level of liquidity, adequately performs transactions and transmissions and facilitates allocation of savings to investment opportunities in the economy. In its most common definition, financial stability means the stability of key financial institutions and financial markets, and does not in any way rule out bankruptcy on the part of individual financial institution as well as severe fluctuations in asset values. Financial stability implies identification of sources of major risks, imprudent financial risk management, not efficient pricing of assets and implementation of appropriate policies.

A stable financial system is a key ingredient for a healthy and successful economy. Everyone needs to have confidence that the system is safe and stable, and functions are proper to provide vital services to the economy. Safeguarding and maintaining the stability of financial system is of primary importance to central banks of most countries. This is because low inflation and unemployment and fast economic growth, as common objectives of monetary and other state authorities, cannot be achieved in the modern economy without a developed and stable financial system through which the effects of monetary policy measures can be effectively channeled to other economic sectors.

=== Instruments used by the Central Bank to maintain financial stability ===
The Central Bank has a variety of instruments for maintaining financial stability. Such instruments are:

- risks analyses and assessment
- market intelligence, that is creating widespread transparency with regard to central bank's objectives, publicly identifying risks, encouraging financial market participants to increase their awareness of these risks to act accordingly
- payment system oversight and development
- market operations and liquidity assistance
- acting as lender of last resort
- financial Stability committee
- other

In order to identify probable risks affecting financial system, the Central Bank analyses a number of indicators of local and external financial system, as well as of the real sector, monitors financial markets, and oversights payment systems. At this stage, the Central Bank analyses financial system pillars (financial institutions, financial market infrastructure and financial markets), as well as developments in macro economy. The Central Bank draws on analysis of all factors that might directly or indirectly affect stable functioning of the financial system. Another important tool to assess financial stability is indicators of financial soundness endorsed by IMF.

The Central Bank also uses internationally known stress-testing models to assess the vulnerability of financial system in time of probable risks materialising. Stress scenarios are simple “what if” events, which allows to assess the costs of financial system or individual participants.

In maintaining financial system's stability an important aspect is risk controlling. The Central Bank carries out risk controlling by implementing prudential and macro prudential policies, as well as supervision of the financial system. Prudential regulation presumes setting a certain regulatory framework for an individual institution in order to keep risks affecting an individual institution's stability under manageable limits. Macro prudential policy itself means using prudential instruments, which will provide the stability of the financial system as a whole. Macro prudential regulation is aimed to minimize systemic risks.

=== Central Bank policies addressed to maintaining financial stability ===
Central Bank policies to maintain financial stability fall into three types.

- When the financial system is characterized as stable, or in other words the fluctuations of main indicators are within allowable band, a preventive policy will need to be implemented. Implementation of such a policy implies monitoring a number of macro-prudential indicators on an ongoing basis. It is necessary to capture the financial sector's direct and indirect international exposures in both quantitative and qualitative terms. Preventive policy is addressed to financial stability by using available supervisory and regulatory tools.
- When financial system fluctuations are within the target band yet tend to infringe it, which might cause high volatilities in certain financial or non-financial sectors, then corrective policy will be applied. Actions arising out of the above policy cover activities such as examining new financial market instruments and risk analysis methods, studying loan loss provisioning practices, discussing new capital adequacy requirements and adopting international reforms and implementing appropriate supplements. This in fact provides for an opportunity to extend available instruments and improve regulatory framework.
- In case the fluctuations of financial system are beyond the level allowed and the system is not able to perform its key functions, a recovering policy will be implemented. Recovering measures commonly include an extended variety of anti-crisis measures. Extraordinary anti-crisis measures taken by the Central Bank are: extended opportunities for banks to borrow from the central bank, policy of quantitative easing, emergency liquidity assistance under its function of lender of last resort, etc.

=== Financial Stability Committee ===
In 2011 the Central Bank established a consultative body that is the Financial Stability Committee. The main task of the Committee is assessment of financial stability. The Committee identifies probable risks that threaten the financial stability and the main channels of its influence, debates the main measures addressed to the providing of financial stability, suggests the scope of further policy directions and other necessary actions. The committee sessions take place every quarter. In extraordinary situations a special session is convened on the basis of chairman's verbal decision.

- The Committee is available with the structure as mentioned below:
- Committee chairman
- Chairman of Central bank
- Committee deputy chairman
- Deputy Chairman of Central Bank
- Committee members
- Head of Financial system stability and development department
- Head of Monetary policy department
- Head of Financial Supervisory department
- Head of Financial department
- Head of Financial system regulation department

=== Financial Stability Report ===
The Central Bank or Armenia publishes the results of ongoing analyses in the Financial Stability Report. Financial stability report is published on an annual basis starting from 2007 and on a semiannual basis, starting from 2010. Main goal of the Financial Stability Report is to focus on current developments in real and financial sectors that could undermine the financial stability. The report presents the Central Bank's assessment of financial stability, main risks threatening the financial stability and measures underway to prevent and reduce these risks. The publication of Financial Stability Report allows improving awareness of financial institutions, companies, entrepreneurs and general public concerning measures taken by authorities to ensure financial system stability. On the other hand, the purpose of providing information on risk origins and vulnerability of financial stability is to help people for taking decisions in various situations. The risks affecting financial stability of Armenia can emerge in local economy, foreign economy and it financial system itself. Taking into account the aforementioned, the possible risks affecting financial stability of Armenia are presented in 5 areas:

- Risks derived from the developments of world economy (macro economy and financial markets)
- Risks derived from the developments of Armenian macroeconomic environment
- Risks derived from the developments of Armenian macroeconomic environment
- Risks derived from the developments of financial institutions of Armenia
- Risks derived from the developments of financial infrastructures.

The Central Bank of Armenia continuously carries out extensive work in order to make financial stability report more informative and extended in accordance with international practice and in face of new challenges.

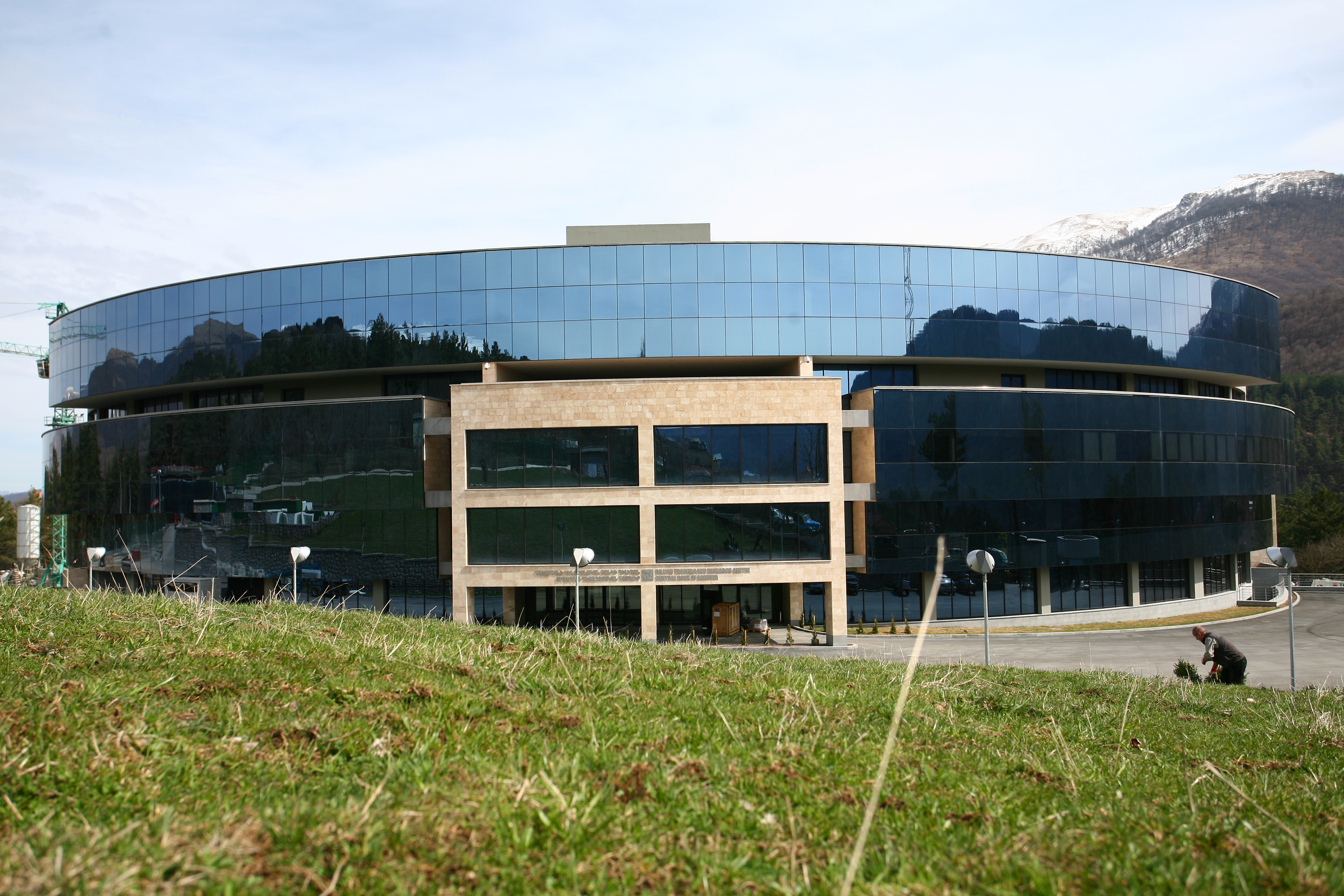
The Central Bank of Armenia's Educational Center in Dilijan

=== Strategy for Maintaining Financial Stability, 2015–2017 ===
==== Maintaining a sound, stable and functional financial system ====
This aspect is aimed at providing the normal activity and stability of the financial system of Armenia, including the creation of necessary conditions for normal operation. This implies that financial institutions and payment and settlement system organizations, fulfill their obligations in time, perform their functions effectively, efficiently and uninterruptedly, manage their risks prudently, absorb and neutralize the risks arising from probable shock situations, while maintaining their activities open and transparent.

===== 1. Current achievements =====
The list of achievements included making a comprehensive analysis of the risks of financial institutions and introducing tools for financial stability monitoring. The financial stability report publication has improved. There were simulation games organized for working out response and other relevant action to emergency situations. A system was introduced to assess risks spilling over to the financial system from external and real sectors, through macro-prudential analyses (quantitative methods, stress tests). The crises management concept and systemic bank disclosure methodology were developed and are currently in use.

A concept of introducing the new Basel Principles (Basel 3) was developed in order to align the regulatory framework of the Armenian banking system with internationally accepted principles. Work to implement a new model (risk-based supervision) is underway. The joint World Bank and International Monetary Fund team also conducted an assessment of the financial system of Armenia under the Financial Sector Assessment Program in 2012, which marked notable improvements and progress in the field of regulation and supervision of the financial system compared to the 2005 assessment. In particular, the latest assessment indicates that the financial system of Armenia meets the abovementioned principles by nearly 93% which means the country fits the ranking as compliant or largely compliant.

A timetable of implementation of the framework Solvency 2 in the Republic of Armenia was developed and approved. The relevant works for the organization of the timetable indicated events have begun; most particularly the “Non-Life Underwriting Risk Assessment Manual” has been developed and is currently on a pilot stage. In 2012, the total evaluation of Electronic Payment System of the Central Bank in accordance with international principles, set by the Bank for International Settlements, was completed. Based on the results of the evaluation, the EPS has been estimated to be reliable and risk-free in the financial stability aspect. These evaluation results also served a basis for the World Bank activities conducted under FSAP in 2012.

===== 2. Main development goals =====
- Develop a financial stability framework to ensure effective systems and procedures are in place for evaluation of potential risks that pose threat to financial stability, and for crisis management.
- Establish a sustainable framework of regulation and supervision in line with best international experience and principles that would be the best combination of financial system risks management (ensuring stability) and current developments.
- Implement reforms under a single financial system development philosophy to ensure tantamount and balanced development of financial institutions, financial markets and financial infrastructures concomitant with increasing financial intermediation.
- Continue actions toward introduction of advanced bank regulation and supervision standards, specifically new Basel principles, risk-based forwardlooking supervision, consolidated supervision of financial institutions, improve the reporting system and the quality of data reported by banks, and adopt more streamlined approaches to the supervision on the whole. 16
- Continue activities towards introduction of best international standards on insurance regulation and supervision, namely the new principles developed by the International Association of Insurance Supervisors, improve the current supervision approaches, and in particular continue further efforts towards the phase by phase introduction of the Solvency 2 framework.
- Evaluate the “Unified System of Securities Registries Maintenance and Settlement” of the Central Depository of Armenia in accordance with the principles established by the Bank for International Settlements, in order to increase the effectiveness in risk management and functionality of securities settlement systems in the Republic of Armenia and align these systems with internationally recognized standards.
- Evaluate the current changes resulting from the assessment of the EPS of the Central Bank and based on the recommendations for the risk management system for the single purpose to establish compliance of the system operation with the principles indicated by the Bank for International Settlements, which will help the system minimize the emergence of risks and will increase the effectiveness of its performance.

===== 3. Expected outcome and policy action =====
Expected Outcome	Policy Action
1. Effective systems and mechanisms for financial stability and crisis management in line with best international practices	1.1. Development and application of methods for assessment, monitoring and analysis of financial system-specific risks. 1.2. Regular review and update of the crisis management concept, and its alignment with the legislative and regulatory frameworks. 1.3. Development of quantitative methods for assessment of risks, which spill over from external and real sectors, through macro-prudential analyses.
2. Financial system regulation and supervision in accordance with best international practices	2.1. Analysis and evaluation of potential impacts during a staged transition to the Basel 3 Accord. 2.2. Analysis and evaluation of potential impacts during staged implementation of the Solvency 2 framework.
3. New financial institutions, financial infrastructure, tools and services for sustainable development of the financial system	3.1. Formulation of a long-term financial system development strategy for the Republic of Armenia. The strategy will incorporate measures for activities towards further development of individual sectors of the financial system (banks, insurance companies, securities market, payment and settlement system). 3.2. Implementation of measures aimed at strengthening financial intermediation in the Republic of Armenia, particularly contribution to the introduction of technologies that support the provision of remote financial services, expansion of their geography, support for the introduction and gradual development of micro-financing services, innovative products and services, such as non-cash, electronic and mobile financial services.
4. Advanced bank regulation and supervision standards.	4.1. Evaluation of the best international practices introduction feasibility in the banking system of the Republic of Armenia, testing and implementation. 4.2. Improvement and staged introduction of the risk-based supervision framework. 4.3. Testing and final introduction of the system designed to obtain raw data from banks. 4.4. Passing and enforcement of a law on consolidated supervision.
5. Advanced insurance regulation and supervision standards.	5.1. Evaluation of the best international practices introduction feasibility in the banking system of the Republic of Armenia, testing and implementation. 5.2. Stage by stage introduction and development of a risk-based supervision framework for insurance activity.
6. CDA “Unified System of Securities; Registries Maintenance and Settlement” performance alignment with Principles for Financial Market Infrastructures.	6.1. Detection of possible sources of risks in the system. 6.2. Evaluation of the system based on international principles/standards; initiation of an action plan for necessary reforms towards the minimization of the risks identified during the evaluation. 6.3. A follow-up monitoring of the evaluation results
7. Central Bank EPS performance alignment with FMI Principles.	7.1. Evaluation and implementation of the changes intended under the action plan to minimize the risks identified during the evaluation. 7.2. A follow-up monitoring of the system at an established time periodicity.

== Monetary policy ==
The Central Bank of Armenia (the CBA) is a legal entity empowered with state functions. The primary goal of the CBA is price stability, pursuant to the Constitution of Armenia, Article 83.3 and Law on Central Bank of Armenia, Article 4. Since January 1, 2006, the CBA has been exercising an inflation targeting strategy which lays down that the forecast level of inflation is an intermediate goal and the interest is an operational goal. The CBA coordinates the primary goal with the Government of Armenia, as stipulated by the Armenian Law on State Budget, and approved by the National Assembly of Armenia. The CBA itself decides on the strategy of monetary policy it implements, as well as intermediate and operational target indicators that are contained in the monetary policy program and subject to presentation to the National Assembly. The program outlines the main directions of the monetary policy and the monetary instruments which the CBA uses in order to fulfill its objectives. The CBA also conducts a foreign exchange policy.

Starting from January 2006 Central bank of Armenia within the scope of the Law on Central Bank of Armenian officially adopted new framework of inflation management` moving to the strategy of inflation targeting.

The rationale for the adoption of inflation targeting strategy by the Central Bank of Armenia

In view of price stability, the Central bank of Armenia (CBA) develops, approves and implements a monetary policy program (the Armenian Law on Central Bank, Article 6). During first week of each quarter CBA Forecasting Team presents the inflation forecasts for the upcoming 12-month horizon, future monetary policy directions necessary to minimize deviations of projected inflation from the target, which are discussed during the Board meeting. At the beginning of each month, CBA Board decides on the level of the CBA refinancing rate (repo rate), while each quarter it determines the monetary policy directions for the given quarter. Coordination of monetary and fiscal policies is very important aspect for developing and implementing the monetary policy. The coordination involves both opting for basic macroeconomic indicators and issues relating to short-term adjustment of liquidity by the CBA, disbursement of external financial inflows and issuance and allocation of T-bills by the Government. “Agreement on the Principles of Cooperation between the CBA and Ministry of Finance” serves a framework for the coordination of the two policies. The monetary and fiscal policies are coordinated in the process of preparation, adjustment and implementation of medium-term, monthly, quarterly and annual programs. The CBA develops economic and financial projects in cooperation with the Government, and supports their accomplishment if these do not run counter to its objectives. The authorized representatives of the CBA and Ministry of Finance participate in proceedings of standing committees that oversee the pace of policy implementation. The delegates are vested with the right to defend their interests and address issues of concern.

=== Foreign exchange policy ===
The foreign exchange policy of the Central Bank is aimed at enhancing the reliability and international credibility of the Armenian Dram and creating a legal and economic framework for current account operations, flows of the Capital Account and foreign investments, through an effective management of currency reserves of the Republic of Armenia. To this end, an appropriate exchange rate regime has been adopted, principles of the foreign currency operations framework have been developed and a scope of legislative background has been set.

Exchange Rate Regime

The Central Bank is conducting a freely floating exchange rate regime which is consistent with the principles of liberalized capital account operations and implementation of an independent monetary policy. The Central Bank's intervention in the foreign exchange market is carried out based on the goals of the monetary policy. The Central Bank publishes the Armenian Dram's market based average exchange rates vis-à-vis foreign currency.

== History ==
=== Pre-1918 ===
The earliest coins found in Armenia date back to the 6th–5th centuries BC. These are exclusive samples of silver coins of Achaemenian Iran, Miletus of Asia Minor and Athens of Greece. It is known that even in the 4th century BC Achaemenian dynasty satraps of Armenia Tiribazus and Orantas struck coins portraying their images. Coins were widely used in Armenia from the beginning of Hellenistic age (second half of the 4th century BC). Owing to international trade silver coins of Alexander the Great (336–323 BC) appeared in Armenian market from Asia Minor and Mesopotamia. Armenian coins of that period normally depicted portrait of the monarch on the obverse and mythological symbols as well as name and title of the king on the reverse, in Greek inscriptions. Starting the second half of the 3rd century BC Armenian kings of Sophene, Arsham, Xerxes, Ardisares, among them, struck copper coins, which are the earliest Armenian coins on record. Somewhat more coins reached us from the period of Artaxiad kingdom (189 BC – 1 AD). Armenian coins appeared in international trade during the reign of Tigran the Great (95–55 BC). These were minted both in cities of Armenia (Artashat, Tigranakert) and Syria (Antioch, Damascus). There are not known coins of the Arsacid dynasty (66–428) on record. Initially, coins of the neighboring countries, Roman Empire and Parthian Kingdom, were in circulation in Armenia. Later on, coins of Sassanid dynasty and Byzantine Empire were put into circulation. After being conquered by Arabic Caliphate (second half of the 7th century) coins of Umayyads and, later on, of Abbasids were used in circulation. Of the money of Arabic Caliphate, silver dirham, copper fils and a limited number of gold dinar were in circulation in Armenia. At the end of the 10th-century silver dirham was replaced by the Byzantine gold coin which then took a lead role of money in the region at that time. In the meantime coins of Seljuk rulers began penetrating into circulation. There have not been coins struck during the reign of the Bagratid dynasty (885–1045), although the copper coin of the king Curicé II (1048–1100), a descendant of the Bagratid dynasty of Lori, is known to us. This is the first coin on record in Armenian inscriptions. At the end of the 11th century, the Armenian State of Cilicia (1080–1375) was established on the territory of Lesser Armenia and Sophene. The history of this state spanned two periods – Great Princedom and Kingdom. The coins of the period Princedom (1080–1198) are barely available in unit samples. There is relatively a greater variety of coins of the period of Kingdom (1198–1375) available. Of Cilician issuance one can distinguish coins in silver, billon (an alloy with a smaller amount of silver), copper and a very limited number in gold. Gold coins were called dahekan; silver coins – dram, tagvorin; and copper coins – dang, qartez, pogh. Armenian inscriptions and portrayal of the cross are the main characteristic features of the Cilician coins. During the reign of king Hetum the First (1226–1270) coins carrying bilingual appellations (Armenian and Arabic) were struck. Early in the 13th century, coins of Georgian kings, which were minted of copper in the main and silver in small number, penetrated into the circulation in the northern and eastern parts of Armenia. Coins of Mongolian khans appeared in circulation starting from the 1260s. These were basically silver dirhems and copper fils in small number. Later on, coins of different Moslem dynasties of Turkish origin were used in money circulation. Starting from the 16th-century coins of Iranian shahs dominated in circulation in Armenia. In the 17th century, one can observe a massive penetration of west-European thalers into circulation in Armenia. Until the early 19th century coins of Iranian shahs were circulating in eastern part and coins of Turkish sultans in western part of Armenia. A new era of money cycle arrived after annexation of Armenia to the Russian Empire (the 1st half of the 19th century). Money issues of the empire and, for the first time, paper notes were put into circulation. In the aftermath of the February overturn paper notes of the Russian Provisional Government began circulating in Armenia.

=== Money cycle in 1918–1924 ===
In the aftermath of the October Revolution in 1917 Armenia, Georgia and Azerbaijan left the Russian Empire soon to create the Transcaucasian Commissariat, an independent constituency. In February 1918, the Transcaucasian Commissariat issued notes in nominal value 1, 3, 5, 10, 50, 100 and 250 rubles. For the first time, Armenian inscriptions appear on these notes and the numismatic intelligence takes them as the first Armenian paper notes. Achieving independence on May 28, 1918, the first Republic of Armenia put the checks, as issued by Yerevan branch of the State Bank, into circulation. In summer of 1920, banknotes of the 1919 series were introduced in nominal value 50, 100 and 250 rubles. These were designed by H. Kojoyan and A. Fetvajyan and printed by “Waterloo & Sons Limited” in London. This issue stands apart with its original design as it uses national patterns and ornaments full of creativity. In 1921, Yerevan branch of the State Bank issued checks in nominal value 10,000 rubles. Then banknotes of the 1921 series in nominal value 5,000 and 10,000 rubles came in. At some point later, banknotes of the 1922 series in nominal value 25,000, 100,000, 1 million and 5 million rubles as well as bills at par value of 5 million rubles were issued. In 1922 the three republics – Armenia, Georgia and Azerbaijan – united to constitute the Federative Union of Transcaucasian Soviet Socialist Republics. In 1923, the FUTSSR issued in banknotes in nominal value 1000, 5000, 10000, 25,000, 50,000, 100,000, 250,000, 500,000, 1 million, 5 million and 10 million rubles. On December 13, 1922, the FUTSSR was re-organized into the Transcaucasian Soviet Socialist Federative Republic and began issuing banknotes in nominal value 25, 50, 75, 100, 250 million and 1 and 10 billion rubles. The 10 billion rubles banknote was never put into circulation. The 1923 series bill at par value of 1 chervonets was neither put into circulation. Shortly thereafter, these banknotes were replaced although the authorities of Soviet Armenia had the December 20, 1920 decree stipulating that the circulation of banknotes of Soviet Russia was mandatory, too. After formation of the Soviet Union, a monetary reform was passed with an April 15, 1924 government decree issuing resolution on substitution of all types of banknotes in circulation in Transcaucasia for the banknotes of unified samples of the Soviet Union.

=== Money cycle in the Soviet period ===
In 1924, coins were put into circulation in the territory of the Soviet Union. These were in nominal value 1, 2, 3 and 5 kopecks in copper; 10, 15, 20 kopecks in base-alloy silver; and 50 kopecks and 1 ruble in silver. Copper coins of the smallest nominal value of half kopeck were minted in 1925–1928. In 1923, the first Soviet gold coin (1 chervonets in nominal value) was minted. This conformed in all its features to the gold coin worth of 10 rubles of Russian Empire. It almost never appeared in circulation and was only used in foreign trade transactions. Starting from 1926, coins in nominal value 1, 2, 3 and 5 were made of bronze; starting from 1931, coins in nominal value 10, 15 and 20 kopecks were made of cupro-nickel alloy. There has been a great variety of the first Soviet banknotes. In circulation were the Soviet chervonets (10 rubles) and the rubles designed to portray the symbols of the Soviet ideology. The types of banknotes of this period were often replacing each other. A monetary reform was passed in 1947 with a key objective to promote to a quick recovery of the war-suffered economy, withdrawal of counterfeit money from circulation and replacement of the old samples with new ones. The monetary reform of 1961 was aimed to change the price scale (10:1), improve the money cycle and issue banknotes of new design. New series of coins in nominal value 1, 2, 3, 5, 10, 15, 20, 50 kopecks and 1 ruble were put into circulation. The series of banknotes consisted of 1, 3, 5, 10, 25, 50 and 100 rubles in nominal value. In 1991, to regulate the money cycle, banknotes in nominal value 50 and 100 rubles were withdrawn from circulation and substituted by new ones – banknotes of the 1991 series in nominal value 50 and 100 rubles (two different types). Later on, banknotes of the 1991 series in nominal value 1, 3, 5, 10, 200, 500 and 1000 rubles were put into circulation. Since February 1992, prices were liberalized, which led to the rise in prices and devaluation of the ruble. Banknotes of the 1992 series in nominal value 50, 200, 500, 1000, 5000 and 10000 rubles were put into circulation.

=== Money cycle in the Republic of Armenia ===
On November 22, 1993, the local currency, the Dram, was put into circulation in nominal value 10, 25, 50, 100, 200 and 500 drams, using an exchange rate of 200 rubles for one Dram. Banknotes of the former Soviet Union, in nominal value 1–500 rubles of the 1961–1992 issue were allowed to co-circulate with the Dram up until March 17, 1994. Coins in nominal value 10, 20, 50 luma and 1, 3, 5, 10 drams of aluminum alloy were put into circulation since February 21, 1994. Banknotes in nominal value 1000 and 5000 drams were put into circulation since October 24, 1994 and September 6, 1995, respectively. Starting 1998, banknotes of the second series in nominal value 50, 100, 500, 1000, 5000 and 20000 drams were put into circulation. The banknotes of this series meet modern requirements in terms of security, endurance, quality and design. On June 4, 2001, the commemorative banknote in nominal value 50000 drams dedicated to the 1700th anniversary of adoption of Christianity in Armenia was put into circulation. In the period 2004–2005, the banknotes in nominal value 50 and 100 drams of the 1993–1995 series and the 1998 series were withdrawn from circulation. These have been ceased to be a legal tender in the Republic of Armenia yet are allowed to be exchanged at their par in commercial banks and the Central Bank of Armenia, without limitation. In the period 2003–2004, the coins of the second series in nominal value 10, 20, 50, 100, 200 and 500 drams were put into circulation. Since August 24, 2009, the banknote in nominal value 100000 drams was put into circulation. The banknote depicts the king Abgar the Fifth of Edessa. According to accounts of Armenian historians, Abgar was the first king of Armenian origin to have adopted Christianity. He has been venerated by the Armenian Apostolic Church. Since August 1994, Central Bank of Armenia has issued a few dozen of commemorative coins made of gold, silver and cupronickel.

=== 20th century up to 1991 ===
At the start of the 20th century, concentration of capital was taking place in Armenia as capitalistic relations developed. The Russian capital was the dominant one. Major Russian banks were branching out in key towns of Transcaucasia. Branch offices of banks owned by merchants from Azov-Don, Volga-Kamsk, Tiflis and Caucasus, on the whole, opened up in Yerevan. The Public Town Bank opened up in Alexandrapol, Armenia.

In 1914, there were 10 banking institutions functioning in Yerevan. Banks were involved in commercial and industrial activities through investing in shareholding companies, in addition to their lending operations. In the times of civil wars the financial and credit system, as well as money cycle, were disrupted; financial rights were just a formality, while no framework was in place to regularize the functioning of treasuries.

In the aftermath of the October Revolution in 1917 Armenia, the Transcaucasia Commissariat was established, which included Armenia, Georgia and Azerbaijan. Khachatur Karchikyan was appointed as the Minister of Finance of the Transcaucasia Commissariat.

In May 1918, the Transcaucasia Commissariat was dissolved, and establishment of three independent republics followed thereafter.

On May 28, 1918, Hovhannes Kajaznuni was appointed as Prime Minister and Sargis Araratyan and, later on Grigor Jaghetyan, as Minister of Finance of the First Republic of Armenia.

In 1918–1919 the monetary system of the country was completely ruined, the state Treasury was unable to cover current expenses and make much-needed allocations. In order to retrench public expenditures and increase revenue the Government decided to raise the taxes, cut down subsidies, downsize the number of state servants, and create new jobs.

The Government had to carry out an additional issue to cover the current expenses. “The Government covered growing public expenditures by issuing banknotes, the printing machine was functioning smoothly and quickly, printing 600–800 million rubles monthly. Naturally, such flood of money reflected to a great extent the commercial and industrial situation of the country and the high cost of living. Food prices grew at an abnormal rate”, Prime Minister Simon Vratsyan wrote.

The Government was issuing unsecured paper money in large number. From August 1919 through December 1920 checks worth 11 billion rubles were issued, which was equal to gold worth 6 million rubles. This led to inflation. Whereas in the summer of 1919 the gold chervonets of Russian Empire (10 rubles) was estimated to amount to 900 rubles in checks, the next summer it was already worth 200,000 rubles.

On August 20, 1920, the law on “Counterfeiting” was passed. The law stipulated, in particular, that capital punishment could be sentenced to anyone, who would have any association to forgery, and/or supply tools and materials to the forger for counterfeiting.

On October 26, 1920, another law was passed with the goal to turn the Yerevan branch of the State Bank into the State Bank of the Republic of Armenia. However, the implementation of this law failed as a decree on nationalization of banks was adopted on December 20, 1920, after the Bolsheviks came to power.

In the framework of credit policy, the Government of the Republic of Armenia took measures in order to halt inflation and turn the State Bank into a functioning institute, since it was the Ministry of Finance who was responsible for implementing banking operations. The Armenian Government attempted to supply a British bank in Batumi with Armenian checks at certain exchange rate. Attempts also included keeping some foreign currency in the Bank of Tiflis and carry out exchange of pound sterling, franc, Georgian and Azerbaijani currency by Armenian checks in all central towns of the Republic of Armenia in exchange of the said currency. In spite of all efforts of the Government the population, the Moslem part in particular, had no confidence in Armenian banknotes, and basically Transcaucasia bonds were used in trade. The Armenian Government attempted to negotiate with the Georgian Government for destruction of the Transcaucasia bonds.

Before the establishment of the Soviet regime, there were 6 banks (branches) operating in Armenia, 340 million Transcaucasia bonds and Armenian checks worth more than 11 billion rubles were in circulation with nominal value of only 353 thousand pre-war rubles. Money was completely devalued. Issue proceeds and other income were channeled to the Ministry of Internal Affairs and military needs. The key component of the monetary system, the state budget, was missing.

On December 28, 1920, the Order No. 5 of the People's Commissariat of Finance renamed the Yerevan branch of Russian State Bank into the State Bank of the SSRA and into the People's Bank of the SSRA the next day, with Vladislav Moravski appointed as Governor of the Bank. In August 1921 the People's Bank terminated activities and its power was assigned to the PCF.

On March 20, 1922, the State Bank of SSRA was established. The first Governor was Martin Sahakyan who held this position until 1924.

In 1924 the Yerevan branch of the State Bank of the SSRA was renamed into the Yerevan branch of the State Bank of the Soviet Union, with Grigor Jaghetyan as Governor of the Bank.

On April 15, 1924, the state decree endorsed a decision to replace all types of banknotes in circulation in Transcaucasia with the Soviet Union banknotes.

In 1929, in response to architect and academic Alexander Tamanyan's proposal, a land parcel was provided for a new building of the Armenia branch of the State Bank. Designed by Nikolai Bayev, the construction started in 1930 and was completed in 1933.

In 1930–1932, a credit reform was carried out to transform specialized banks to long-term lender institutions while the branch network was assigned to the competence of the Armenia branch of the State Bank. Specialized banks were functioning through the branch offices of the State Bank. As at January 1, 1930, there have been 7 branch offices; in 1931 branch offices numbered 26.

In 1938 the State Bank came out of the structure of the People's Commissariat of Finance.

In 1946 the State Bank again joined the Ministry of Finance of the Soviet Union. The Governor of the Bank served simultaneously as Deputy Finance Minister.

In 1953 the Armenia branch of the State Bank was renamed into the Armenian Republican Branch of the State Bank of the Soviet Union.

In 1954 the State Bank of the Soviet Union eventually came out of the structure of the Ministry of Finance of the Soviet Union.

In 1961 a monetary reform was passed with the goal to exchange old series of banknotes with the new ones at a 1 to 10 ratio.

In August 1977 a serious robbery was committed: a large amount of money was robbed from the vault of the Bank. People call this ‘the century’s robbery’. In summer of 1978, the offenders were arrested in Moscow, and most part of the stolen money was returned to the Bank.

In 1987 the Armenian Republican Branch of the State Bank was renamed into the Armenian Republican Bank of the State Bank of the Soviet Union. The Bank had 52 branch offices.

In 1987 a number of specialized banks were established, including External Bank of Economic Affairs, Ardshinbank (bank for industry and construction), Bnaksotsbank (bank for household and social needs), Agroardbank (bank for agro-industry) and Khnaybank (savings bank).

Starting from 1988 all 52 branch offices of the Armenian Republican Branch of the State Bank, with their books, were transferred to Ardshinbank, Bnaksotsbank and Agroardbank.

In 1988 the fourth and the last charter of the State Bank of the Soviet Union was approved, saying that the State Bank is the country's head bank, the unified issuance center and the organizer of credit and settlement relations in the national economy.

=== Development of the CBA ===
Introduction of the national currency:

In 1993 the Republic of Armenia Law on “The Central Bank of the Republic of Armenia” was adopted, and the National Bank was renamed into the Central Bank of the Republic of Armenia. The national currency, the Dram, was put into circulation in the territory of the Republic of Armenia under Resolution No. 15 of 19.11.2003 of Supreme Council of the Republic of Armenia.

Creation of monetary policy:

In 1994 for the first time, the Central Bank formulated a monetary policy program in that way adopting the strategy to curb inflation.

Adoption of banking legislation:

In 1996 the National Assembly of the Republic of Armenia adopted the following laws in order to regularize the Armenian banking sector, as follows: Law on the Central Bank of the Republic of Armenia, Law on Banks and Banking, Law on Bank Bankruptcy, Law on Bank Secrecy. Maintaining price stability has become the number one priority for the Central Bank, and a new framework for banking system rehabilitation measures was established.

Creation of national payments and settlements system:

In the period 1996–2001 interbank electronic payments system BANKMAIL, government securities accounting and settlements system BOOKENTRY were introduced. The SWIFT system started to be widely used in international payments. In the meantime, efforts were spent to launch the national payments and settlements system in compliance with international standards by creating the unified payment and settlement system ArCa (‘Armenian Card’).

Improvement in the banking legislation framework; creation of infrastructures:

In the period 2002–2004 considerable improvements and innovations were made to the banking legislation, giving birth, among others, to the establishment of guarantee of deposits of individuals. Further, the Central Bank took on the function for combating money laundering and terrorism financing. The process of rehabilitation of the banking sector was completed and Armenian banks availed themselves of increased levels of replenishment of capital.

Central Bank as mega regulator and responsible for financial stability:

In 2006 a single framework for risk-based financial regulation and supervision was introduced in Armenia in compliance with international practice. The Central Bank was given authority to regulate and supervise activities of all participants of the financial sector. So, the Central Bank took on the function of megaregulator along with responsibility for maintaining financial stability. A corporate governance culture was introduced to the financial sector, the banking system in STAGES OF DEVELOPMENT OF THE CENTRAL BANK4 particular. Banks became increasingly service-friendly, in a sounder environment of competitiveness.

Inflation targeting:

In 2006 the Central Bank moved to a fully-fledged inflation targeting strategy. And since CBA's main and primary objective is to ensure price stability and considering the expectations that inflationary risks will persist in the external world, the annual inflation target band for 2008-2010 has been set at 4% (+1.5%).

Development of financial sector; institutional and infrastructural reforms:

In the period 2007–2011, the Central Bank initiated legislative reforms pertaining to the financial system operations. This set up a ground for reforms to implement in the non-bank financial sector, namely insurance and capital markets as well as paved a way to implement reforms in infrastructures. NASDAQ OMX, one of the best operators worldwide made its entry to the Armenian market. Further, a consumer interest protection component was established; the office of financial system mediator started its operations; a compulsory third party motor liability insurance scheme was introduced The banking sector is the biggest player of the Armenian financial market. The sector accounts for approximately 95 percent of assets of the financial system.

As at December 31, 2014 the Armenian financial market comprised:

- 21 commercial banks (with 509 branch offices) and one development bank (All-Armenian Bank) accounting for around 90 percent of financial sector assets. The banks'
- Total capital amounted to AMD 469 billion
- Total assets amounted to AMD 3 trillion 411 billion
- Total liabilities amounted to AMD 2 trillion 942 billion
- Paid-up statutory fund amounted to AMD 280.1 billion
- Nonresident equity amounted to AMD 186.4 billion
- 32 credit organizations (with 149 branch offices)
- 8 insurance companies and 2 intermediaries (insurance brokerage firms)
- 141 pawnshops
- 203 exchange offices (including branch offices)
- 7 money transferring companies
- 4 payment instrument and payment and settlement document processing and clearing companies
- Securities market participants that include 21 banks as investment service providers, 8 investment firms, 4 investment fund managers, the Armenian Central Depository, and NASDAQ OMX Armenia.

=== Governors ===
Chairmen of the State Bank and the Central Bank

- Grigory Smirnov, 1896–1901
- Anton Krizhijanovsky, 1901–1905
- Nikolai Sannikov, 1905–1910
- Constantine Sibani, 1910–1916
- Vladislav Moravski, 1916–1921
- Martin Sahakyan, 1922–1924
- Grigor Jaghetyan, 1924-1930
- Garsan Varshamyan, 1930–1931
- Hovhannes Davtyan, 1931–1936
- Vardan Mamikonyan, 1936–1937
- Arkady Minasyan, 1937–1939
- Sergey Baturi, 1939–1943
- Riza Velibekov, 1943–1944
- Artashes Sargsyan, 1944–1967
- Stepan Safaryan, 1967–1969
- Andrey Papovyan, 1969–1972
- Vladimir Aghasyan, 1972–1986
- Isahak Isahakyan, 1986–1994
- Bagrat Asatryan, 1994–1998
- Tigran Sargsyan, 1998–2008
- Arthur Javadyan, 2008-2020
- Martin Galstyan, since 2020

== National currency ==
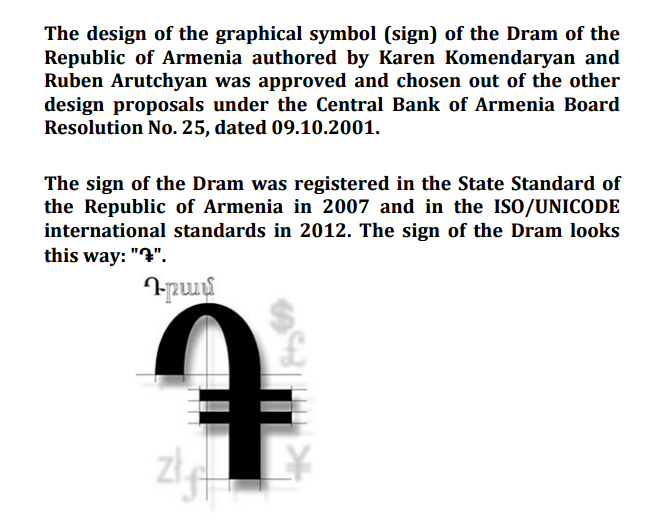
The sign of Dram

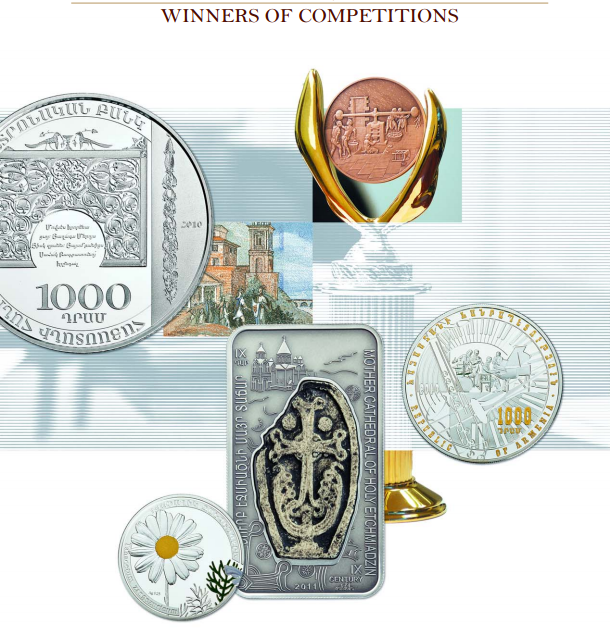
Winners of Competitions - Dram Coins

The national currency of the Republic of Armenia is dram (ISO code - AMD, the sign - ). One dram is equal to one hundred luma. The CBA is vested with the exclusive right to issue currency. The national currency was put into circulation on 22 November 1993. The design of the graphical symbol (sign) of the Dram of the Republic of Armenia authored by Karen Komendaryan and Ruben Arutchyan was approved and chosen out of the other design proposals under the Central Bank of Armenia Board Resolution No. 25, dated 09.10.2001. The sign of the Dram was registered in the State Standard of the Republic of Armenia in 2007 and in the ISO/UNICODE international standards in 2012. On September 21, 1991 Armenia was proclaimed as an independent republic. On this occasion there arose a need to create a national currency. On March 27, 1992, the name was chosen for the Armenian currency, the Dram, and sketches of the future banknotes were prepared. The first series of banknotes of 10, 25, 50, 100, 200 and 500 dram entered into circulation on November 22, 1993. Then, in 1994 banknote series was added with the banknote of 1 000 dram denomination, and later, in 1995, with 5 000 dram banknote. The design of the banknotes contained images of modern and historic, architectural and cultural monuments of Armenia. While working on the first series of banknotes, the Central Bank of the Republic of Armenia actually started a tradition of representing on them the most important aspects of the Armenian cultural and historical heritage. Banknotes of the first series circulated until 2005, although since 1995, work began on the development of a new, second series of banknotes. The design concept changed definitely. Banknotes became more sophisticated in terms of technical parameters: they were more in line with international standards and the latest international trends. The banknotes which replaced the first series began portraying the most famous personalities who have left an invaluable imprint on the culture and historical heritage of Armenia. In the period from 1999 to 2010 banknotes of 50, 100, 500, 1 000, 5 000, 10 000, 20 000, 100 000 dram were in circulation. The first two of them are not circulating nowadays. On June 4, 2001, the first commemorative banknote of 50,000 dram to celebrate the 1700th anniversary of the adoption of Christianity as the state religion in Armenia was issued. The design of the banknote was different from the general concept adopted for the second series of the Armenian banknotes. The banknotes of the second series, including the commemorative one, were re-issued in the form of reprints, keeping with the overall design as well as inscriptions. In the process of reprinting particular attention was paid to improving the security of banknotes and bettering their overall quality. Nearly all the achievements of modern security technologies – varnishing, use of holograms, OVI, etc. – were introduced. The number of security features at the moment reaches 17, which is why the Armenian banknotes are able to meet the highest standards accepted in security printing. The most important work was done during the last reprint of banknotes of 1 000, 5 000, 10 000 and 20 000 dram banknotes. All design elements were optimized and consolidated; modern security features appeared not only on the obverse, but on the reverse of the banknotes as well. This work has earned high praise of international community. In particular, at the international conference of banknotes in Singapore in 2011 this approach was considered relevant and effective. The current circulation is difficult to imagine without circulating coins. The first series of circulation coins was issued in Armenia in 1994. Those were the coins with nominal value of 10, 20, 50 luma and 1, 3, 5, 10 dram. Furthermore, since 2003, the second series coins with nominal value of 10, 20, 50, 100, 200, 500 dram were issued. The highest nominal value of the series, 500 dram, was issued in order to replace banknotes of the same nominal value. All the coins, except for 10, 20, 50 luma and 1, 3, 5 dram, which quickly lost their relevance due to high inflation at the time, were struck several times. The third series of Armenian dram banknotes were issued in 2018, to celebrate the 25th anniversary of Armenia's national currency. All denominations for this series are the same as its previous issues except the 2,000-dram banknote which is a newly introduced denomination. The 50,000-dram banknote was re-issued for this series and the omission of the 100,000-dram banknote for this issue. The first three denominations, 10,000 ֏, 20,000 ֏ and 50,000 ֏, were issued on November 22, 2018. The final three denominations, 1,000 ֏, 2,000 ֏ and 5,000 ֏ were issued on December 25, 2018. In 1996–97, circulation commemorative coins (two copper-nickel coins dedicated to the 32nd Chess Olympiad and the 100th anniversary of the birth of Charents, and a gold coin dedicated to the goddess Anahit) were issued for the first time. The next issue of commemorative coins in 2012 was noteworthy as an interesting and modern concept was being first implemented. In addition to 50 dram circulation coins with standard design, commemorative coins with identical specifications were issued in dedication to the 10 regions of Armenia and the Armenian capital Yerevan. The obverse of these coins depicted the most typical images associated with the regions they represent. All commemorative coins are in circulation on a par with the standard ones and are a good source of increased interest among collectors. In pursuit of learning from the experience of countries such as the United States, Austria, Canada, etc., starting 2011 the Central Bank of Armenia has been issuing silver bullion coins of the series "Noah's Ark". These coins represent 7 weight categories from 1/4 oz to 5 kg. The purpose of the project is to provide opportunities for households to invest their extra money in silver coins. A well-chosen theme of the issue as well as excellent quality made it possible to sell over million pieces of these coins in just a year. The concept of reflecting most important cultural and historical aspects on banknotes and coins is most clearly and vividly realized in the issuance of collector coins. From 1994 to date, more than 170 high-quality collector coins have been issued. These coins are dedicated to the Armenian state, great Armenian generals, history of Armenian currency, formation of the Armed Forces of Armenia. Many coins have also been issued to commemorate birth anniversaries of renowned people of science, literature, culture, and sports. Much attention is given to Christian values: these are ancient temples and churches, and spiritual values of the past. The diversity of animal and plant life is reflected in the issues that deal with rare and unique species of fauna and flora of Armenia. Planned and systematic work to improve the quality of the banknotes and coins in Armenia could not be left unappreciated. Many issues have won awards at the most prestigious international numismatic forums. This book, dedicated to the 20th anniversary of Armenian dram, contains the most comprehensive list of issues of notes and coins of Armenia. We hope that this work will be interesting and useful not only for numismatists, but also for those who takes interest in Armenia with its rich culture and history.

== Laws and regulations ==
=== CBA in Armenian Constitution ===
The President of The Republic of Armenia shall recommend to the National Assembly the candidacy of the Chairman of the Central Bank.

The main objective of the Central Bank of the Republic of Armenia shall be to ensure stability of prices in the Republic of Armenia. The Central Bank shall develop, approve and implement monetary policy programs. The Central Bank shall issue the currency of the Republic of Armenia – the Armenian Dram. The Central Bank shall be independent whilst performing the tasks and functions granted by the Constitution and the law. The Chairman of the Central Bank shall be appointed by the National Assembly upon the recommendation of the President of the Republic for a six-year term. The same person may not be elected to the office of Chairman of the Central Bank for more than two consecutive terms. In cases prescribed by the law the National Assembly may by a majority of its votes and upon the recommendation of the President of the Republic remove the Chairman of the Central bank from office.(Article 83.3)

=== Currency legislation and regulatory acts ===
Armenian Laws

- Armenian Law on "The Central Bank of Armenia".
- Armenian Law on "Banks and Banking".
- Armenian Law on "Currency Regulation and Currency Control".
- Armenian Law on "Credit Organizations".
- Armenian Law on "Foreign Investment".

"Armenian Civil Code"

The Armenian Law on "The Central Bank" sets out the objectives, authority, structure and management of the Central Bank. The Law provides that the Central Bank is a legal entity, the sole founder of which is the Republic of Armenia. The key objective of the Central Bank is ensuring price stability, which is achieved by developing, approving and conducting monetary policy programs. The Law further provides that the objectives of the Central Bank include creation of requisite conditions for stability, liquidity, solvency and normal functioning of the banking sector, and creating and developing an efficient payment and settlements system. The Law specifies the Central Bank's relationship with Government authorities, banks and other legal entities; it regulates the authority of the Central Bank as a currency agent, the circulation of the Armenian currency, currency control, and other relations essential to the economy.

The Armenian Law on "On Banks and Banking" regulates the activities of Armenian banks. The Law determines registration, licensing, regulation and termination of activities of banks, their branches, foreign bank branches and all affiliations, and terms of supervision of banking. It explicates the definitions 'bank', 'banking activity', 'bank deposit' and some other definitions; it regulates the corporate structure and management and the scope of financial, investment and subscription activities, and the prudential economic standards.

On 24 November 2004, the Armenian Law on "On Currency Regulation and Currency Control" in a new edition was adopted that explicated the definitions 'resident and non -resident', 'current currency transactions', 'movement of capital' and 'financial currency transactions'. It determined the cases of implementing transactions in Armenian currency and foreign currency in the territory of Armenia. It further provided that all pecuniary quotations in the sale of property, rendering of services and works should be made in the Armenian Dram. The Law delineates the scope of the bodies performing currency control.

The period 2002–2003 was momentous as a number of essential changes and innovations occurred in the banking legislation. On 29 May 2002, the Armenian Law on "On Credit Organizations" which gave the Central Bank authority to license and supervise the activities of credit institutions in Armenia.

== Statistics ==
According to the article 5(g) of the Law on the Central Bank of RA the Central Bank of the Republic of Armenia (CBA), implements collection, compilation and publication of monetary and financial statistics in order to carry out its objectives. Particular tasks in this area include:

- Collection and compilation of accurate monetary and financial statistics;
- Provision of accurate, reliable and timely data to the public through statistical publications and website of the Central Bank.

Since 2011 the responsibility for the compilation of the external sector statistics (balance of payments, international investment position and external debt) has been undertaken by the Central Bank of Armenia.To carry out its objectives according to the Law on Central Bank of RA, the Central Bank of Armenia, within the framework of the CBA Board Resolutions and the CBA Chairman Decrees, is engaged in the collection of other sectors' statistics (Real, External and Government Sectors) for its internal use. According to the Law of RA on State Statistics the National Statistical Service of RA (NSSA) is officially responsible body for statistics of these sectors of economy, the website of which is www.armstat.am.

The Central Bank conducts statistical analyses in all four sectors of the economy (smoothing of time series, forecast and classification of economic indicators, calculation of various indices, etc.) and participates in developing the statistical methodology in accordance with international standards. In order to monitor and evaluate certain economic phenomena, the CBA conducts surveys, in particular to find out expectations of business entities on economic growth and inflation, disclose price-generation mechanisms at enterprises, measure banks' expectations on macroeconomic and financial indicators, evaluate foreign cash held by household, etc. The Central Bank releases the statistical data through the CBA homepage and the CBA following publications according to advance release calendar :

- The Central Bank Bulletin" (monthly)
- The Central Bank Statistical Bulletin" (annual).

An important step to the development of Armenia's statistical system was its subscription on November 7, 2003 to the Special Data Dissemination Standard (SDDS) of the IMF (www.dsbb.imf.org ), which enables compilation of the participant countries’ statistics on the base of unified standards. Armenia was the 3rd among the CIS countries and the 54th in the world countries that was joining this system. The CBA statistical work are coordinated by the Statistics Department of the Central Bank. The Department comprises the Monetary and Financial Statistics Division, Data Processing Division, the Economic Statistics Development Division, the External Sector Statistics Division, and the Credit Registry.

== Cooperation with international financial organizations ==
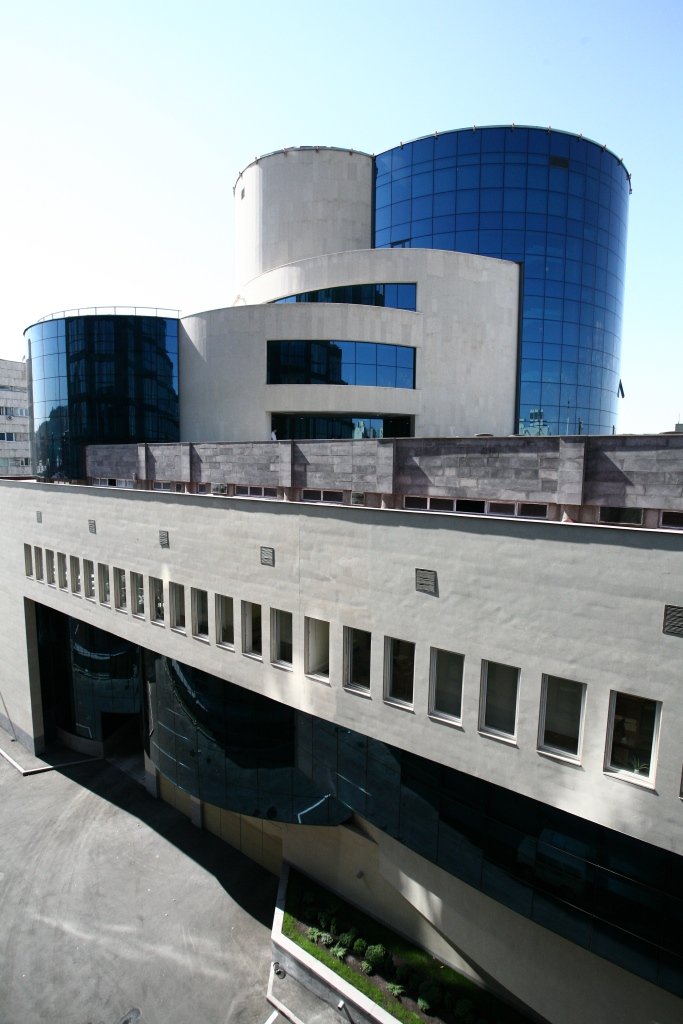
A backside view of the building

There is integration of the Republic of Armenia and its Central Bank in the world community. The CBA maintains mutual cooperation with:

- International Monetary Fund (IMF)
- World Bank
- European Bank for Reconstruction and Development
- Asian Development Bank

The international cooperation has allowed the CBA to begin realization of the received credits on transformation system, maintenance of balance of payments, financing of private business, institutional and rehabilitation loans, and other similar programs.

The positive results of work with the international financial organizations opens new prospects for the realization of joint projects together with various economic institutes and large banks of the world.

== Independence ==
The sole founder of the Central Bank is the Republic of Armenia. The Central Bank is independent from state authorities of the Republic of Armenia in implementing its activities in the context of setting targets and deciding on the tools to achieve these targets. Independence is needed in order to implement effective policies aimed to maintain price and financial stability. In doing so, the Central Bank makes its contribution to a sustainable economic growth in a longer run.

== See also ==
- Armenian dram
- Armenia Stock Exchange
- Central Bank Visitor Center (Armenia)
- Central Depository of Armenia
- Economy of Armenia
- Federation of Euro-Asian Stock Exchanges
- State Revenue Committee of Armenia
- List of banks in Armenia
- List of central banks
- List of financial supervisory authorities by country
