= List of companies of Armenia =

Location of Armenia

Armenia is a sovereign state in the South Caucasus region of Eurasia. Located in Western Asia, on the Armenian Highland, it is bordered by Turkey to the west, Georgia to the north, Azerbaijan to the east, and Iran and Azerbaijan's exclave of Nakhchivan to the south.

The economy of Armenia benefits strongly from investment and support of Armenians abroad.

Before independence, Armenia's economy was largely industry-based – chemicals, electronics, machinery, processed food, synthetic rubber, and textile – and highly dependent on outside resources. The republic had developed a modern industrial sector, supplying machine tools, textiles, and other manufactured goods to sister republics in exchange for raw materials and energy.

As of January 2019, there are about 40 thousand registered companies with payroll positions. There are 247 companies with over 250 registered employees. The average wage in these companies amounts to 240 thousand AMD.

== Notable firms ==
This list includes notable companies with primary headquarters located in the country. The industry and sector follow the Industry Classification Benchmark taxonomy. Organizations which have ceased operations are included and noted as defunct.

Notable companies Status: P=Private, S=State; A=Active, D=Defunct
Name	Industry	Sector	Headquarters	Founded	Notes	Status	
Air Armenia	Consumer services	Airlines	Yerevan	2003	Airline, defunct 2014	P	D
Air Dilijans	Consumer services	Airlines	Yerevan	2015	Airline	P	A
Ameriabank	Financials	Banks	Yerevan	1910	Universal bank	P	A
Ararat Cement	Industrials	Building materials & fixtures	Armenia	1927	Cement	P	A
Ararat International Airlines	Consumer services	Airlines	Yerevan	2010	Airline, defunct 2013	P	D
Ardshinbank	Financials	Banks	Yerevan	2003	Bank	P	A
Armenia 2	Consumer services	Broadcasting & entertainment	Yerevan	1999	Television	P	A
Armenia TV	Consumer services	Broadcasting & entertainment	Yerevan	1997	Television	P	A
Armenian Railways	Consumer services	Travel & tourism	Yerevan	1992	Defunct 2008	P	D
ArmSwissBank	Financials	Banks	Yerevan	2005	Private investment bank	P	A
Artsakhbank	Financials	Banks	Yerevan	1996	Bank	P	A
Atlantis European Airways	Consumer services	Airlines	Yerevan	2004	Defunct 2021	P	D
Avshar Wine Factory	Consumer goods	Distillers & vintners	Avshar	1968	Winery	P	A
Bars Media	Consumer services	Broadcasting & entertainment	Yerevan	1993	Film studio	P	A
Central Bank of Armenia	Financials	Banks	Yerevan	1993	Central bank	S	A
ErAZ	Consumer goods	Auto parts	Yerevan	1964	Defunct 2002	P	D
Evocabank	Financials	Banks	Yerevan	1990	Bank	P	A
Gazprom Armenia	Oil & gas	Exploration & production	Yerevan	1997	Part of Gazprom (Russia)	P	A
GNC-Alfa	Telecommunications	Mobile telecommunications	Abovyan	2007	Mobile network, land-lines, internet	P	A
HayPost	Industrials	Delivery services	Yerevan	1991	Postal services	P	A
Hetq Online	Consumer services	Publishing	Yerevan	2001	Online newspaper	P	A
Hrazdan Cement	Industrials	Building materials & fixtures	Hrazdan	1979	Cement	P	A
Hrazdan TV	Consumer services	Broadcasting & entertainment	Hrazdan	1991	Television	P	A
HSBC Bank Armenia	Financials	Banks	Yerevan	1996	Part of HSBC (UK)	P	A
Ingo Armenia	Financials	Full line insurance	Yerevan	1997	Insurance	P	A
Jermuk Mineral Water Factory	Consumer goods	Beverages	Jermuk	1951	Mineral water	P	A
Kotayk Brewery	Consumer goods	Brewers	Abovyan	1974	Brewery	P	A
Multi Group Stone	Basic materials	General mining	Abovyan	2002	Stone works	P	A
PanARMENIAN.Net	Consumer services	Publishing	Yerevan	2000	Online news	P	A
Public Television Company of Armenia	Consumer services	Broadcasting & entertainment	Yerevan	1956	Television	P	A
Rusal Armenal	Basic materials	Aluminum	Yerevan	2000	Aluminum, part of Rusal (Russia)	P	A
Sanitek Armenia	Industrials	Waste & disposal services	Yerevan	2010	Waste management	P	A
Shant TV	Consumer services	Broadcasting & entertainment	Yerevan	1994	Television	P	A
Shoghakat TV	Consumer services	Broadcasting & entertainment	Yerevan	1998	Television, defunct 2026	P	D
Telecom Armenia	Telecommunications	Mobile telecommunications	Yerevan	1995	Mobile network, land-lines, internet	P	A
TotoGaming	Consumer services	Gambling	Yerevan	2004	Sports and casino gaming	P	A
Ucom	Telecommunications	Mobile telecommunications	Yerevan	2009	Mobile network	P	A
Vertir Airlines	Industrials	Delivery services	Yerevan	2009	Cargo airline	P	D
Veteran Avia	Consumer services	Airlines	Yerevan	2009	Charter airline	P	D
Viva Armenia	Telecommunications	Mobile telecommunications	Yerevan	2004	Mobile network, land-lines, internet	P	A
Yerevan Ararat Brandy Factory	Consumer goods	Distillers & vintners	Yerevan	1877	Wine	P	A
Yerevan Brandy Company	Consumer goods	Distillers & vintners	Yerevan	1887	Brandy	P	A
Yerevan Computer Research and Development Institute	Technology	Computer hardware	Yerevan	1956	Technology	P	A
Yerevan Confectionery and Macaroni Factory (Grand Candy)	Consumer goods	Food products	Yerevan	1933	Confectionary	P	A
Zangezur Copper and Molybdenum Combine CJSC	Basic materials	Nonferrous metals	Kajaran	1951	Mining	P	A

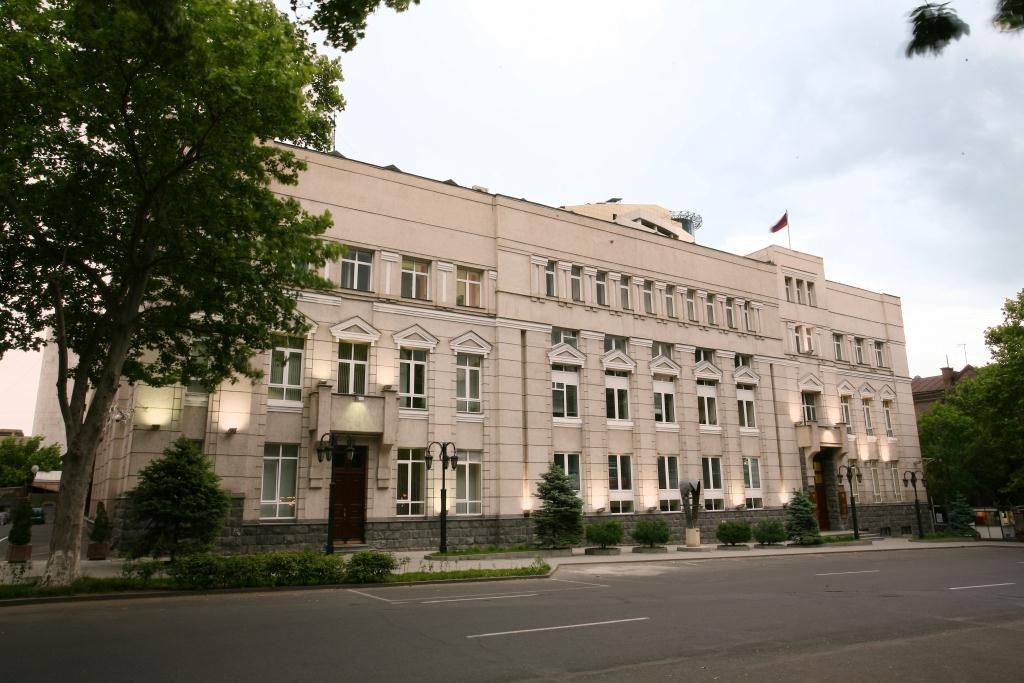
The Central Bank of Armenia in Yerevan.

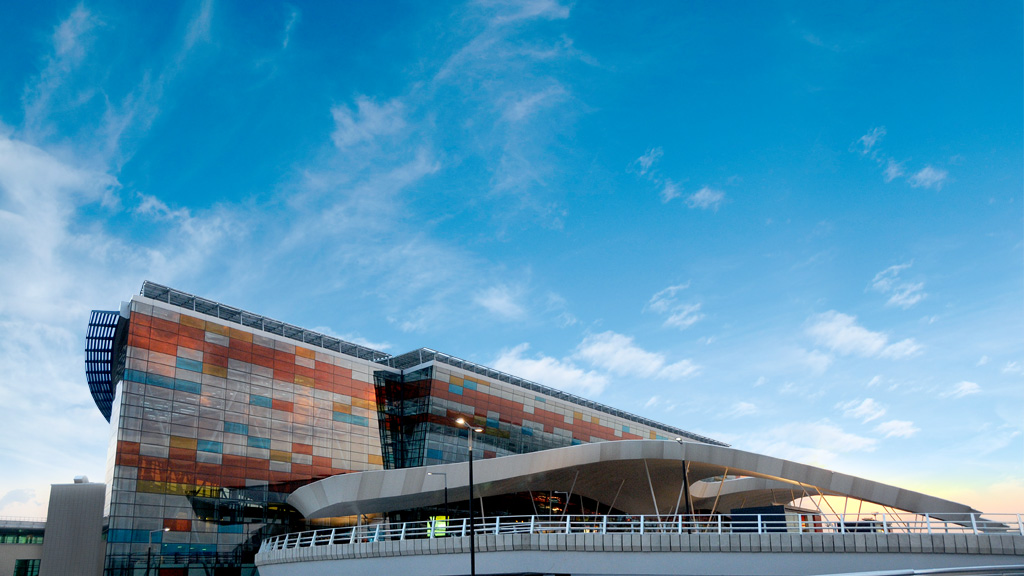
The main entrance to the Zvartnots Airport.

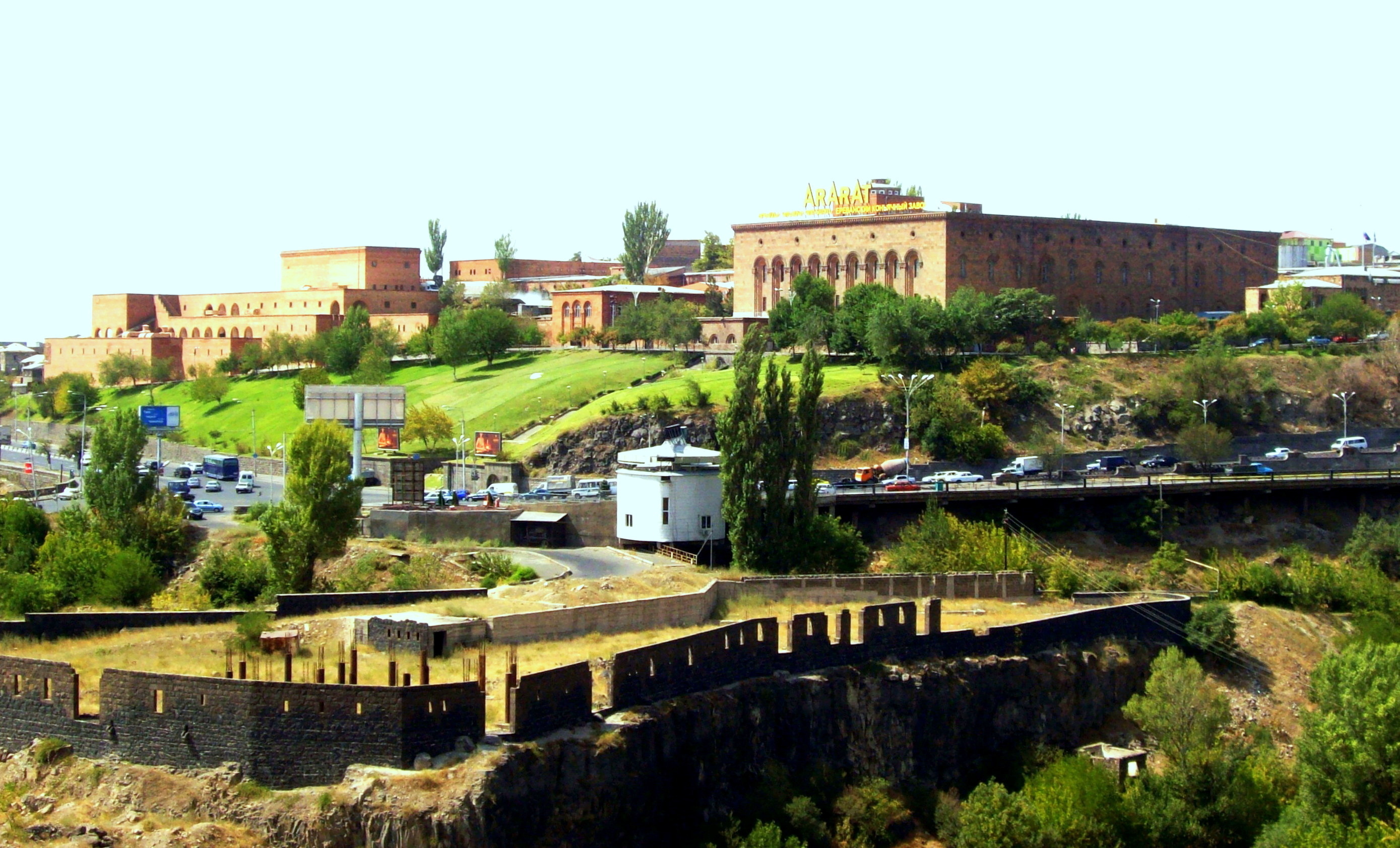
The Yerevan Brandy Company, producer of Ararat since 1877.

== Other lists of leading companies ==
More banks are included in the list of banks in Armenia.

Each quarter, the largest taxpaying companies are disclosed and published online. Data may be looked up per industry and company size. E.g. among software development companies, the largest taxpayer between 2014 and 2017 was Synopsis Armenia.

A list of IT sector companies in Armenia can be found on the site of EIF Guide. Meanwhile, the Chamber of Commerce and Industry features a list of leading international technology companies in Armenia. Notable IT companies founded in Armenia include PicsArt, Krisp, and others.

== See also ==
- Economy of Armenia
