= Noy (brandy) =

Armenian brandy

NOY
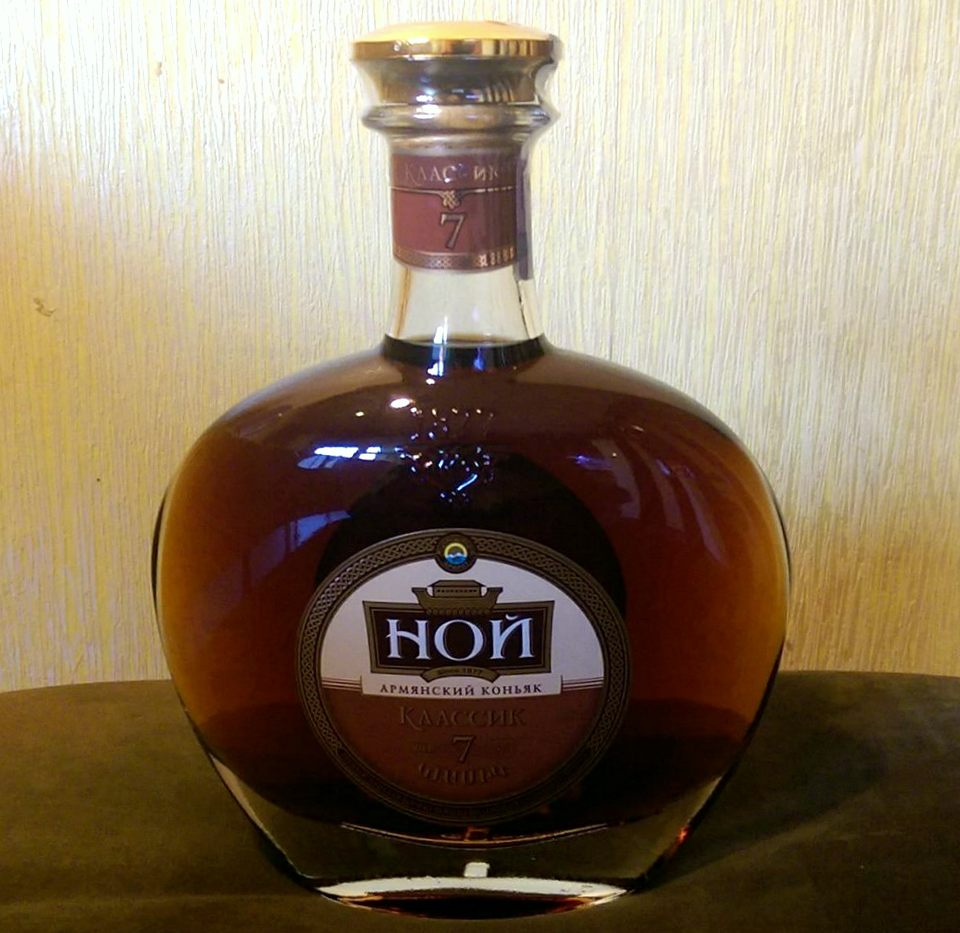
- NOY Classic, 7 years old
- Founded: 1877
- Founder: Nerses Tairyan, Nikolay Shustov
- Headquarters: Yerevan, Armenia
- Products: Brandy
- Owner: Yerevan Ararat Brandy Factory
- Website: brandy.am

Noy (officially stylized as NOY), is an Armenian brandy (cognac-style) that has been produced by the Yerevan Ararat Brandy Factory since 1877. It was first known as "Armenian cognac" until 1899, when it was branded as "Shustov". With the establishment of Soviet Armenia in 1920, the production of Armenian brandy was nationalized and the brandy was popularized as "Shustov" until 1940, when the drink was labeled as "Ararat", after the re-organization of Armenian brandy production. After the independence of Armenia, the factory was privatized in 2002 and the produced brandy was re-labeled as NOY. It is made from Armenian grapes of Armavir and Vayots Dzor regions, and spring water, based on traditional methods.

== History ==
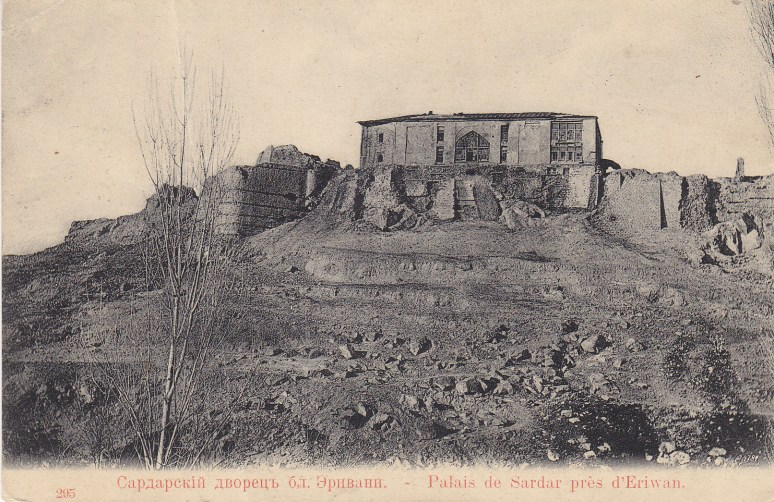
Former Sardar palace. The building of the factory was built on the site of this palace

The Yerevan Ararat Brandy Factory was founded by the Armenian merchant and philanthropist Nerses Tairyan in 1877, within the territory of the former Erivan Fortress. First, he started his industry with wine production. Soon after, he started to produce Armenian brandy as well. In 1899–1900, the factory was acquired by the Russian businessman and wine-maker Nikolay Shustov. In 1920, Armenia became part of the Soviet Union and the economy was entirely nationalized.

The current facilities of the factory were built in 1938 on the site of the former sardar palace of the Erivan Fortress. The building was designed by architect Rafael Israelyan. In 1940, the new building of Shustov's factory became known as "Ararat". However, in 1948, the brandy production in Soviet Armenia was re-organized, with two separate entities: the Yerevan Ararat Brandy Factory (founded in 1877 and current producer of NOY brandy), and the Yerevan Brandy Company (founded in 1887 and current producer of ArArAt brandy).

After the collapse of the Soviet Union in 1991, the factory entered a period of abandonment until 2002, when it was privatized and sold to Multi Group Holding led by businessman Gagik Tsarukyan. Around US$ 50 million was invested into restoration and constructions, acquisition of new bottling line and oak barrels. The production of Armenian brandy was relaunched by the factory and the drink was labeled as "NOY", after Noah whose Ark has rested on the Mountains of Ararat, according to the biblical scriptures of the Book of Genesis.

== Current production ==
Currently, NOY is produced under several categories, including:

- NOY 50 Years Old.
- NOY 30 Years Old.
- NOY Tirakal, 25 years old.
- NOY Kremlin Award, 7, 10, 15 and 20 years old.
- NOY Classic, 7, 10, 15 and 20 years old.
- NOY Traditional, 3, 5, 7 and 10 years old.
- NOY Gift, 3, 5, 7 and 10 years old.
- NOY Araspel, 3 and 5 years old.
- NOY Régal by Uberto Gucci, 3 years old.
- NOY 140, collection.
- NOY 135, collection.
