= Ararat Brandy Factory =

Ararat Brandy Factory may refer to:

- Yerevan Ararat Brandy Factory, Armenian cognac producer in Yerevan since 1877.
- Yerevan Brandy Company, Armenian cognac producer in Yerevan since 1887.
