= Kotayk =

Kotayk may refer to:

- Kotayk Province, Armenia
- Kotayk (village), a village in Kotayk Province, Armenia
- Kotayk Brewery, a brewing company in Abovyan, Armenia
- FC Kotayk, an association football club from Abovyan, Armenia
- Abovyan City Stadium, an association football stadium in Armenia, known as Kotayk Stadium until 2006
