= Postal codes in Armenia =

Postal codes for Armenia

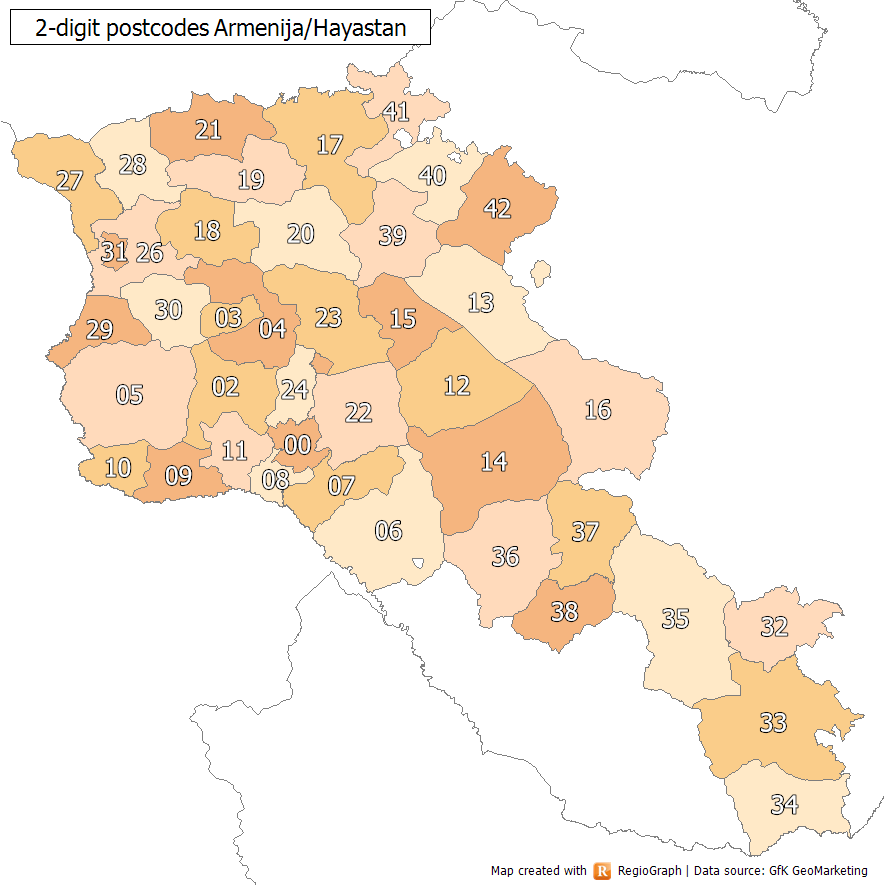
2-digit postcode areas of Armenia (defined through the first two postcode digits)

Postal codes in Armenia consist of four digits. Until 1 April 2006, postal codes consisted of six digits. For example, the previous postal code for the Foreign Ministry was Yerevan 375010 and is now Yerevan 0010.

== See also ==
- HayPost
- List of postal codes
- Postage stamps and postal history of Armenia
