= Yerevan Champagne Wines Factory =

Coordinates: 40°13′36″N 44°32′18″E

- Company type: Open Joint-Stock Company
- Traded as: AMX: ESHG
- Industry: Drinks
- Founded: 1939
- Headquarters: Yerevan, Armenia
- Key people: Fiameta Hakobyan (Executive Manager)
- Products: Alcoholic beverages
- Owner: Versandik Hakobyan and Hrayr Hakobyan (Major shareholder)
- Website: www.armchampagne.am

Yerevan Champagne Wines Factory (Armenian: Երևանի Շամպայն Գինիների Գործարան (Yerevani Shampayn Ginineri Gortsaran)), shortly known as "Armchampagne", is the leading enterprise of Armenia for the production of champagne. The factory was opened in 1939 in Yerevan during the Soviet period. At the beginning, it was formed as a factory for sweet and dry wines. In 1954, the factory's production was extended to include sparkling wines. After the collapse of the Soviet rule, the factory of sparkling wines was privatized in 1995 to become an open joint-stock company.

The factory is located on Tbilisi Highway 20, Kanaker-Zeytun District of Yerevan.

== Products and brands ==
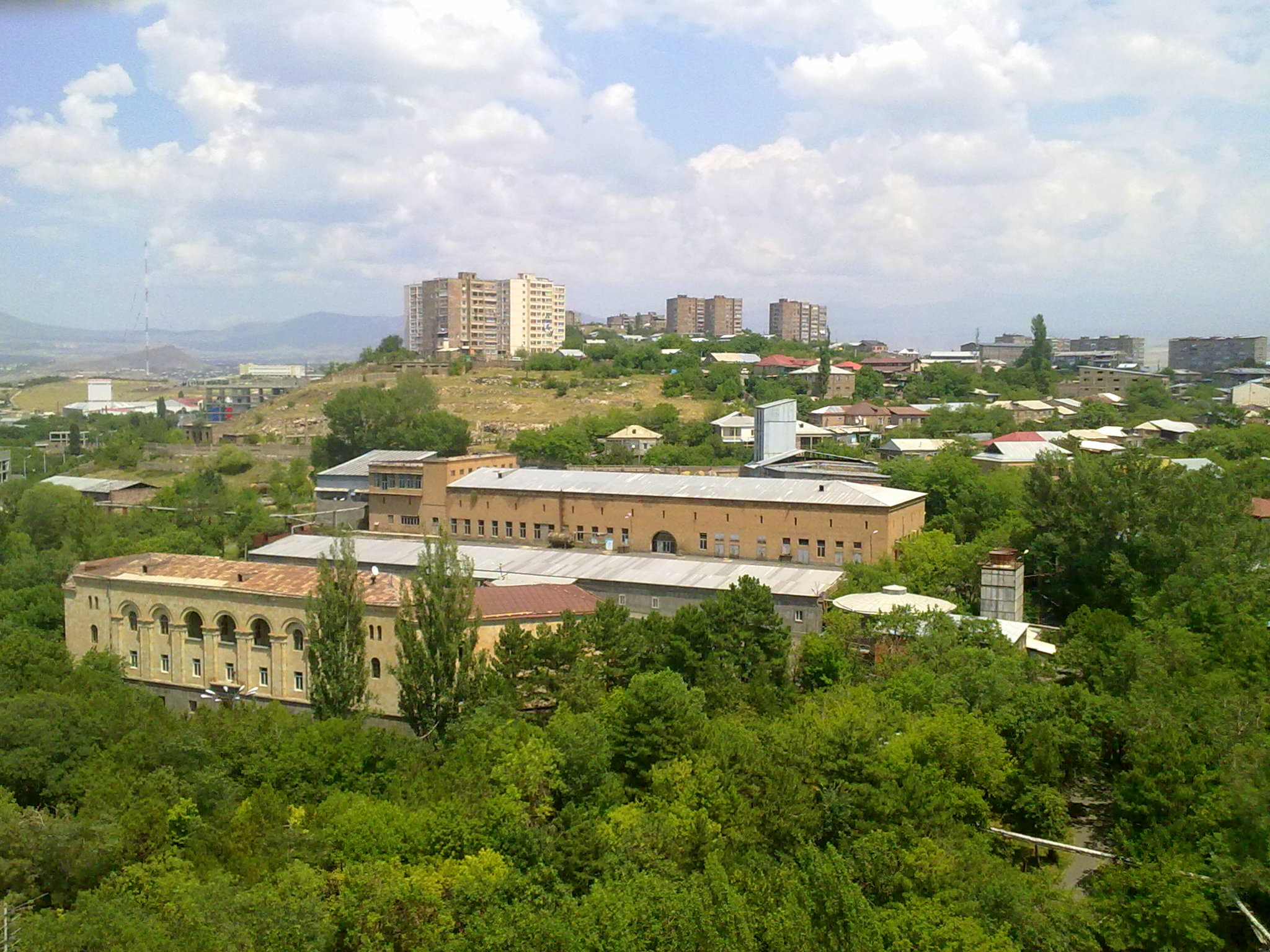
Yerevan Champagne Wines Factory

Currently, the factory has a capacity of producing 10 million bottles per year. the factory produces a full range of sparkling wines, including wine, fruit wine, cognac, vodka, and champagne, all based on French technology.

The factory produces a variety of red dry, semisweet, dessert and vintage wine including the following brands: Hayk Nahapet, Renaissance, Anna, Lilit, Frans, Earth Blood, Wedding and Areni Vayk. Fruit wine is also produced by the factory including the following brands: White Qishmish (white straw wine), Mikado (plum dessert wine), Vin de Farise (red semisweet strawberry wine), Vin de Cassis Noir (red semisweet blackcurrant wine), Vin de Framboise (red semisweet raspberry wine), Black Qishmish (red semisweet straw wine), Vin de Cerise (red semisweet cherry wine), Vin de Mure (red semisweet blackberry wine) and Vin de Grenade (red semisweet pomegranate wine).

Cognac brands produced by the factory include: Pride of Armenia (3, 5 and 7 years old), Voske Dar, Frans, Nare and Trdat.

Vodka brands of the factory include Mujik and Russkaya Nakhodka.

Champagne (sparkling wine) types of the factory include semi dry champagne, red sparkling champagne, dry champagne and semisweet champagne, all being produced under the brand Armenian Champagne.

The owners of the factory in the till date are Versand Hakobyan and Hrayr Hakobyan.

== See also ==
- Yerevan Ararat Brandy Factory
- Yerevan Brandy Company
