= Ayg Stadium =

Football stadium in Ararat, Armenia

Coordinates: 39°51′18″N 44°41′21″E

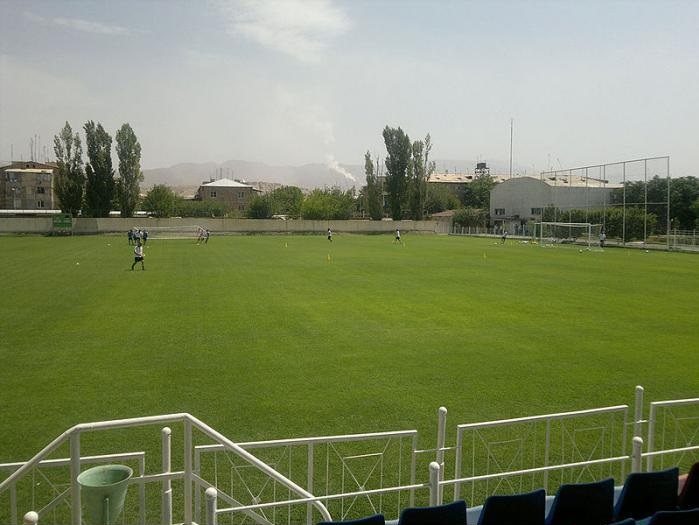
- Interactive map of Ayg Stadium
- Full name: Ayg Stadium
- Location: Ararat, Armenia
- Owner: Ararat Town Council
- Capacity: 1,280
- Surface: grass
- Field size: 107 x 74 meters

Tenants
- Araks Ararat (1992–2001); Impulse (2012–2013)

Ayg Stadium (Armenian: Այգ Մարզադաշտ) is an all-seater football stadium in Ararat, Armenia. It was last home to the Armenian Premier League club Impulse from Dilijan. The all-seater stadium has a capacity of 1,280 seats.

== Overview ==
The town of Ararat was represented in the Armenian Premier League through Araks Ararat. Ayg Stadium was home to Araks Ararat since their debut in the national league in 1999 until the dissolution of the club in 2001. In the first decade of the 21st century, the stadium became a regular training ground for many Yerevan-based football clubs until January 2012 when it became the official home venue of Impulse FC from Dilijan.

The stadium is part of the Ayg sports complex, home to many other structures including an indoor sports hall, indoor swimming pool, billiards saloon, mini-football ground and other sports facilities.

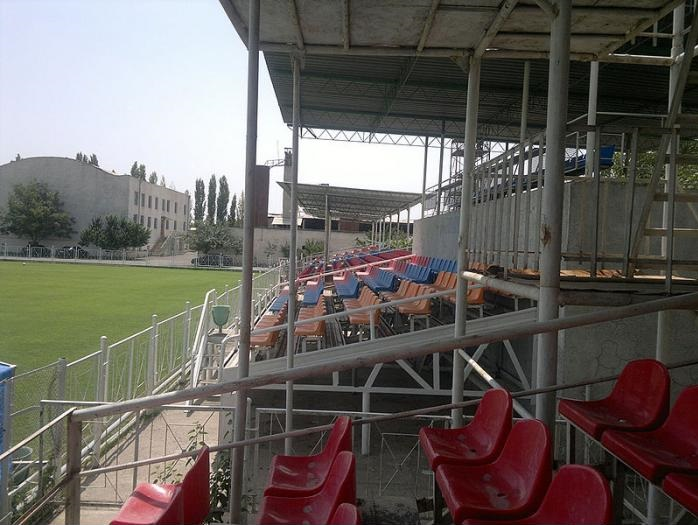
The main stand
