= HayPost =

Official postal operator of Armenia

- Type: CJSC
- Industry: Postal and Financial services
- Founded: 1991
- Headquarters: Yerevan
- Number of locations: 900
- Area served: Armenia; Artsakh; United States
- Products: Express, package, mail delivery services, Electronic funds transfers and Travel insurance
- Number of employees: 4000
- Website: Official site

HayPost (Armenian: Հայփոստ) is the official national postal operator of Armenia. It was founded in 1991 following the collapse of the Soviet Union. HayPost has 900 locations in Armenia, from urban to remote and rural regions, as well as two overseas offices in the United States. The headquarters of HayPost is located in Yerevan.

== History ==
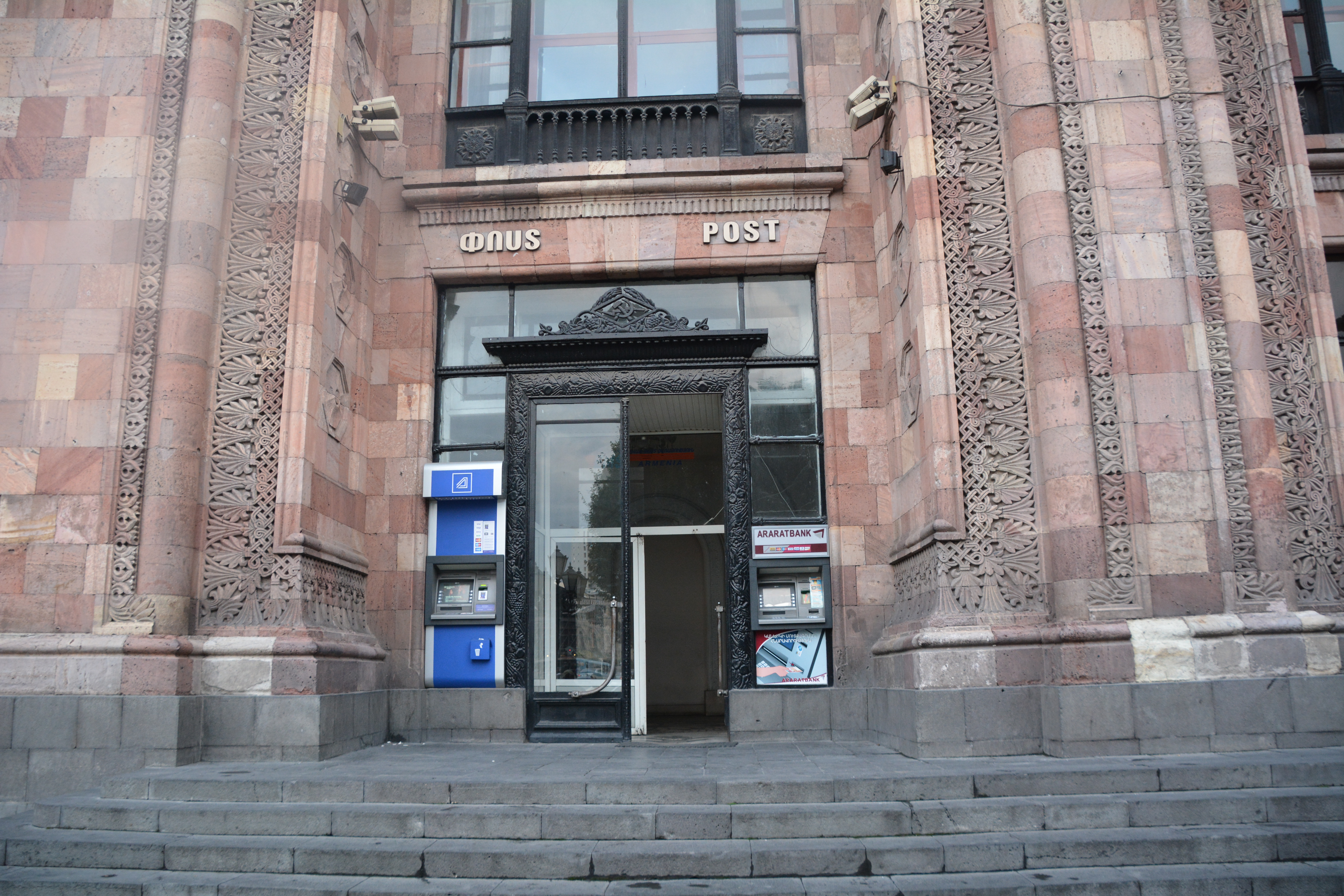
Post office at Republic Square, Yerevan

In November 2006, the HayPost Trust Management B.V. was created to operate HayPost by the Dutch Post Finance International Company. Awarding the operational contract of HayPost to the Dutch company was approved by the Central Bank of Armenia. The Trust Management is currently owned by Argentine businessman Eduardo Eurnekian. In 2007, HayPost became a member of PostEurop, an association of 52 European public postal operators.

As of 2019, HayPost has approximately 4000 employees. Zvartnots International Airport in Yerevan is the main airport used by HayPost for its shipping and receiving of international goods and packages. HayPost maintains an office within the airport grounds.

HayPost stamps have won Europa postage stamp design competitions in 2007 and 2019.

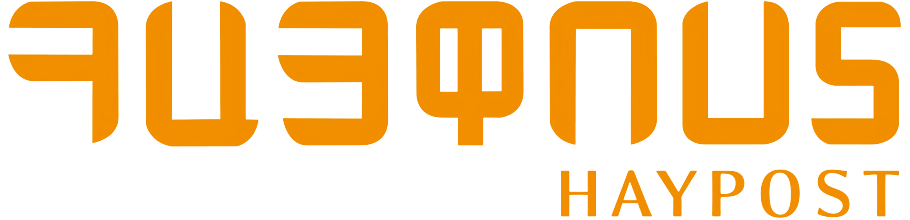
Former HayPost logo used until 2023

== Regions served ==
In addition to operating in Armenia, HayPost operates in the partially recognized state of the Republic of Artsakh.

HayPost also maintains an international offices in Glendale, California,Van Nuys ,CA , Sylmar CA and a subsidiary facility in Delaware. The HayPost USA office was established to make it possible to meet the growing demands for shipping services between the United States and Armenia.

In August 2020, it was announced that HayPost would be launching a subsidiary office in China as well as undergo negotiations with Russia's postal service, to develop new logistical services.

== Services ==
Some of the services offered by HayPost include mail service, bill payments, and travel insurance.

== See also ==
- Economy of Armenia
- List of companies of Armenia
- List of national postal services
- List of postal entities
- Postage stamps and postal history of Armenia
- Postal codes in Armenia
- Universal Postal Union
