= Arinj =

Arinj Առինջ
- Village
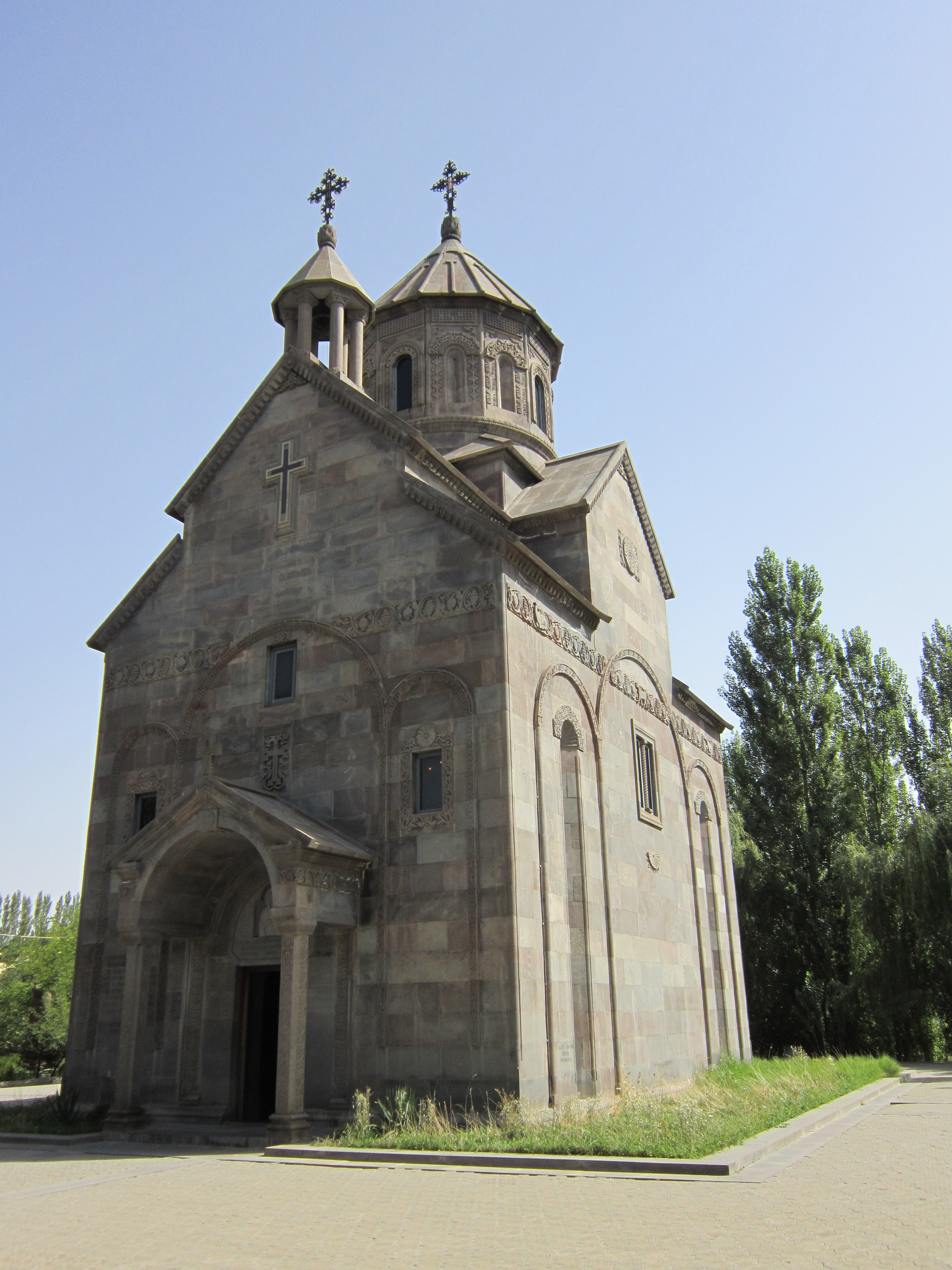
- St. Mariam’s Church in Arinj

- Location within Armenia
- Coordinates: 40°13′53″N 44°34′16″E
- Country: Armenia
- Marz (Province): Kotayk
- First mentioned: 15th century

Area
  - Total: 8.45 km^{2} (3.26 sq mi)
- Elevation: 1,300 m (4,300 ft)

Population (2011 census)
  - Total: 6,220
  - Density: 736/km^{2} (1,910/sq mi)
- Time zone: UTC+4 ( )
- Website: Official website

Arinj (Armenian: Առինջ), is a major village located just north of Yerevan in the Kotayk Province of Armenia. Arinj is an upscale suburb with several mansions belonging to multimillionaires located there, including the mansion of Gagik Tsarukyan, founder of the Prosperous Armenia party.

The village is 41 km south of the provincial capital Hrazdan. As of the 2011 census, the population of the village is 6,220.

== Notable people ==
- Zhirayr Shaghoyan, professional football player of the Armenian national football team
- Gagik Tsarukyan, founder of the Prosperous Armenia party

== See also ==
- Kotayk Province
