= GNC-Alfa =

GNC-Alfa CJSC
- Industry: Telecommunications
- Founded: 2007
- Headquarters: Abovyan, Armenia
- Key people: Hayk Faramazyan (General Director)
- Products: Transport network operator
- Website: www.gnc.am

GNC-Alfa is a telecommunications network services operator in Armenia. The company owns a fiber-optic network passing along the Iran–Armenia gas pipeline. GNC-Alfa network is designed to provide wholesale transport network services to fixed and mobile operators and Internet service providers, as well as transit services via Armenia.

In 2012, Rostelecom acquired 75% minus one share stake in GNC-ALFA via its wholly owned subsidiary, Teleset Networks.

In November 2021, news broke that 100% of “GNC-Alfa”, held by “Rostelecom” since 2019, had been listed for sale. It was rebranded into "OVIO" in 2024 after the decision was made by Rostelecom to take its subsidiary off sale.
