= Yerevan Confectionery and Macaroni Factory =

Yerevan Confectionery and Macaroni Factory (Armenian: Երևանի հրուշակեղենի-մակարոնի կոմբինատ) was an industrial enterprise based in Armenia. It was built in 1933. The confectionery and macaroni departments were amalgamated in 1951. In 1977, the factory became the first producer of chewing gum in Soviet Union, although the gum did not contain any chicle. The factory almost stopped the production during the collapse of Soviet Union in 1990's and was later privatized and restored by Grand Candy company in 2000.
