= Ararat Cement =

Armenian cement company

Ararat Cement Factory CJSC
- Type: Closed Joint-Stock Company
- Industry: Cement
- Founded: 1927; 99 years ago
- Headquarters: Ararat, Armenia
- Products: Portland cement
- Owner: Multi Group Concern
- Website: Official website

Ararat Cement Factory CJSC, is one of two companies in Armenia producing Portland cement. It is owned by Gagik Tsarukyan's Multi Group Concern. Founded in 1927 during the Soviet era near the present-day town of Ararat, gave its first production in 1933. The plant operated as a state-owned factory until 2002 when it was privatized and sold to Multi Group Concern.

Massive investments and modernization process were run after the privatization, allowing modern technologies to be installed at the factory. It was later granted an ISO-2001-2002 international certificate. In July 2026, the factory was nationalized and is again state-owned.
