= Gagik Tsarukyan =

Armenian businessman, politician, and former athlete

- Գագիկ Ծառուկյան
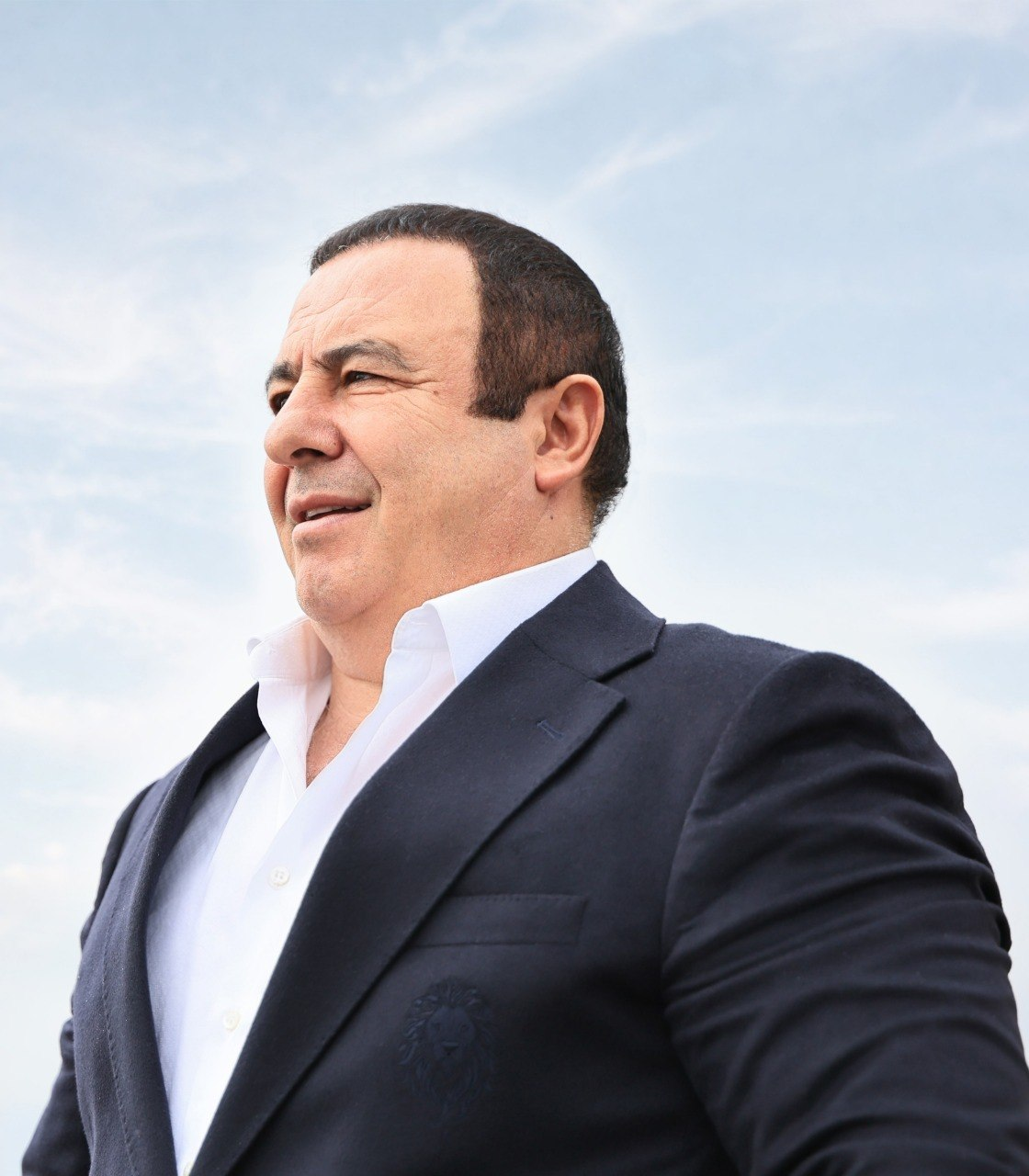
- Tsarukyan in 2026

Chairman of Prosperous Armenia
- Incumbent
- Assumed office 30 April 2004

Leader of Prosperous Armenia in the National Assembly
- In office 2018–2021

Member of the National Assembly of Armenia
- Incumbent
- Assumed office May 25, 2003
- Constituency: Electoral District #42 (2003–2007); Electoral District #28 (2007–2017); National Electoral List (2017–Present)

Personal details
- Born: 25 November 1956 (age 69) Arinj, Armenian SSR, Soviet Union
- Party: Prosperous Armenia
- Spouse: Javahir Tsarukyan
- Children: 6
- Education: Yerevan Institute of Physical Culture
- Website: Official website

Gagik Kolyayi Tsarukyan (Armenian: Գագիկ Կոլյայի Ծառուկյան; born 25 November 1956, is an Armenian businessman, politician, and former athlete. Tsarukyan is the founder and leader of the Prosperous Armenia political party. He also owns various large-scale businesses and is believed to be one of the richest men in Armenia.

Announcing his departure from politics for a hiatus in February 2015, he announced his return to politics in January 2017, forming the parliamentary Tsarukyan Alliance, an electoral alliance made up of Prosperous Armenia, the Alliance Party and the Mission Party. During the 2018 Armenian parliamentary election, Prosperous Armenia obtained 8.26% of the popular vote, coming in second and becoming the largest opposition party in parliament.

An avid sportsman, he practiced boxing, wrestling and arm wrestling, becoming world champion in arm-wrestling in 1996 and winning the European championship in 1998. Tsarukyan is also the president of Armenia's National Olympic Committee, being reelected on December 4, 2008.

In July 2020, he was formally charged with bribery and corruption, right after the National Assembly voted for his immunity from prosecution as a member of parliament to be revoked.

== Biography ==
=== Early life ===
Gagik Tsarukyan was born on 25 November 1956 in the village of Arinj to Nikolay and Roza Tsarukyan. Nikolay was an electrical engineer by profession, but now engages in social activities. Roza is an accountant, managing the research-and-production centre of "Multi Agro" LLC, and at the same time, is the honorary chair of Prosperous Armenia Party Women council.

Tsarukyan studied at Arinj village school, where he met his future wife Javahir, who was also studying at that same school. Tsarukyan was distinguished with physical abilities which influenced his higher education choices.

In October 1979, by the verdict of the Judicial Board of the Criminal Cases of the Supreme Court of the Armenian SSR, Tsarukyan was, with three others, convicted of gang rape and sentenced to imprisonment under Article 112 for 7 years and Article 144 for 4 years. He was also convicted of robbing the two victims. According to Article 37 of the Criminal Code of the Armenian SSR, Tsarukyan was sentenced to a combined total of 7 years in prison in a correctional labour colony.

=== Education and career ===
Tsarukyan graduated from the Armenian State Institute of Physical Culture in 1989. He was involved in sports, mainly boxing, wrestling and arm wrestling. He was a world champion in arm-wrestling, winning a world championship in 1996 and the European championship in 1998.

Since 1989, Tsarukyan has been engaged in entrepreneurship. In 1997, he founded and presided Multi Group Concern group of companies which now includes more than 30 enterprises, such as Kotayk Brewery in Abovyan, Yerevan Chemical Pharmaceutical Company, "Mek" Network of Furniture Stores, Yerevan Ararat Brandy-Wine-Vodka Factory, Ararat Cement Factory, Aviaservice JSC, "Multi Stone" stone processing company, "Multi Rest House" Company, "Global Motors" CJSC, "Multi City House" Company, and other companies and organizations. Tsarukyan is accused of depriving ownership rights of foreign investors in Yerevan Ararat Brandy-Wine-Vodka Factory.

Since 2003, Tsarukyan has been a RA National Assembly deputy. On 25 May 2003 he was elected as a deputy in the National Assembly of Armenia from District 42 after running unopposed, later becoming a member of the National Assembly's Standing Committee on Defence, National Security and Internal Affairs; he was not a member of a parliamentary faction during this term. In late 2005, he founded the Prosperous Armenia Party. During the first congress of Prosperous Armenia on 30 April 2004, Tsarukyan was elected as its president. During the fourth congress of the party, on 12 February 2009, Tsarukyan was re-elected as the party president. He was re-elected to the National Assembly in the May 2007 parliamentary election from District 28 as a Prosperous Armenia candidate. Following this election he became head of the Prosperous Armenia parliamentary faction and a member of the Committee on the Protection of Human Rights and Public Affairs in June 2007.

=== Business interests ===
Gagik Tsarukyan started his business activities in the 1980s. From 1990-1992, he was the executive director of "Armenia" company and in 1992, he was involved in animal husbandry activities, establishing a dairy production enterprise in Arinj village near Abovyan. In 1995, he founded and presided over Multi Group Concern.

In 2002, the Yerevan Ararat Brandy-Wine-Vodka Factory was acquired by the Multi Group Concern, which invested around US$50 million-equivalent Armenian drams for the modernization and constructional works, in obtainment of new line of bottling and oak barrels.

In 2003, Tsarukyan and Versand Hakobyan founded Air Armenia.

=== Athletic career ===
==== Sport achievements ====
Tsarukyan participated in various sports since his school years. He went for boxing, wrestling and arm wrestling. Tsarukyan graduated from the Armenian State Institute of Physical Culture in 1989, as a teacher of physical education and sports, as well as a wrestling coach. Tsarukyan got 3rd place in Men's Masters Right Hand 110+ kg category in the 1996 WAF World Championships, which took place in Virginia Beach, USA.

==== Armenian Olympic Committee ====
Tsarukyan is the current president of the Armenian Olympic Committee, since 2005. Armenian athletes under the leadership of Gagik Tsarukyan showed an unprecedented result during the 2008 Summer Olympics, returning with 6 bronze medals.

On 4 December 2008 Gagik Tsarukyan was unanimously reelected as the Armenian Olympic Committee president by the general assembly of the committee.

=== Political Activity ===
Gagik Tsarukyan has been engaged in politics since the 2000s. Three years later during third convocation of National Assembly elections which took place on May 25, 2003, Gagik Tsarukyan was elected as NA deputy from 42 electoral district. During NA third convocation years, Tsarukyan acted as independent deputy, but was not represented in any faction or any deputy group. From 2003 till 2007, Tsarukyan was a member of RA NA Defense, as well as National Security and Interior Affairs standing committee.

==== Prosperous Armenia Party establishment ====
Tsarukyan established Prosperous Armenia Party in 2004. That same year, during the party's first congress which took place on 30 April, Gagik Tsarukyan was elected as the president of the party. As a result of the National Assembly elections of 12 May 2007, Prosperous Armenia Party received 204 443 votes, receiving 25 mandates in NA. During the fourth congress of Prosperous Armenia Party which took place on 12 February 2009, Tsarukyan was reelected as its president. As a result of Prosperous Armenia Party fourth congress 93 member PAP political council was elected. Gagik Tsarukyan is the chairman of the newly elected PAP Political council.

==== Chairman of NA Prosperous Armenia Party faction ====
Prosperous Armenia Party has 27 deputies in Armenia's National Assembly and Prosperous Armenia faction, led by Gagik Tsarukyan, is the second in NA by its number of representatives. There are 25 members in "Prosperous Armenia" faction. Deputies Martun Grigoryan and Rustam Gasparyan were also the members of Prosperous Armenia Party.

== 2020 prosecution ==
On 14 June 2020, Gagik Tsarukyan's house was searched and he was questioned for over 8 hours by the National Security Service. On the same day the NSS released a statements regarding Tsarukyan. One stated that a group of BHK members, organized by the party's "leading members", were handing out bribes to voters in the 2017 parliamentary elections. Another statement accused of Tsarukyan's gambling firms of financial irregularities costing over 29 billion drams ($60 million USD) in damages to the state. A third case was announced saying that the administration of Arinj village had sold 7.5 hectares of community land to another Tsarukyan company illegally.

On 15 June, law enforcement authorities requested that the National Assembly strip Tsarukyan of his parliamentary immunity so he could be prosecuted. The National Assembly voted unanimously to remove Tsarukyan's immunity on June 16, while the two opposition parties boycotted the vote, and Tsarukyan refused to answer questions from fellow parliamentarians. Shortly after revoking his immunity, Tsarukyan has been charged with bribery and corruption, including buying 17,000 votes for his party during parliamentary elections held in April 2017.

He was arrested on 25 September.

On 11 November, after the 2020 Nagorno-Karabakh ceasefire agreement, he was arrested among other opposition leaders on charges of "illegal conduction of rallies". On 13 November they were freed after a Yerevan Court of General Jurisdiction deemed their arrests unlawful.

== The controversial Christ statue in Armenia ==
In January 2022, Tsarukyan announced his plans to build a massive Jesus Christ statue in Armenia, stating that, "Building a statue of Christ is my family’s wish. It will become a symbol of awakening hope, light and progress in the country, which our state and the Armenian people undoubtedly need". However, he received minor support and faced large scale criticism. The Armenian Apostolic Church also didn't welcome to cult of building statues. The proposed statue is 33 metres (108 ft) high and is to sit on top of a 77 metres (253 ft) high pedestal. It is on the 2,528 metres (8,294 ft) high Mount Hatis 30 kilometres (19 mi) northeast of Yerevan. The project above the community of Hatis is to include 1,700 steps and a cable car. Archaeologists have noted the project has damaged the 3,000 year old Hatis Fortress at the summit.

Ignoring objections from the Armenian Apostolic Church, archeologists and many other people, Armenia’s government has allowed Tsarukyan to erect a giant statue of Jesus Christ on a mountain near Yerevan. With the government's confirmation for the location, the construction process has started with the opening ceremony, with the participation of the Minister of Economy Vahan Kerobyan.

== Multi Group Concern ==
Tsarukian owns several businesses and rose to prominence in the late 1990s as a minority shareholder in a French-owned brewery in Abovyan. His business holdings have since expanded, aided by his close ties with then-President Robert Kocharyan.

Tsarukyan's Multi Group Concern holding company founded in 1995, currently includes more than 40 large and small businesses. In March 2006, Tsarukyan sold his 29% share in the Kotayk Brewery to French beer magnate Castel Group for about US$4 million. In 2011, Tsarukyan acquired the Kotayk Brewery to become the sole owner of the factory.

Businesses that are part of the Multi Group conglomerate include:

- Yerevan Chemical-Pharmaceutical Firm OJSC, founded in 1967, part of Multi Group since 1995.
- Avia Service CJSC (travel services), founded in 1995, part of Multi Group since 1997.
- Euromotors CJSC (BMW importers in Armenia), founded in 1998.
- Technalyumin LLC (furniture manufacturers), founded in 1998.
- Yerevan Ararat Brandy-Wine-Vodka Factory OJSC, founded in 1877, part of Multi Group since 2002.
- Ararat Cement CJSC, founded in 1927, part of Multi Group since 2002.
- Multi Group Stone CJSC, founded in 2002, Abovyan, Armenia.
- Multi Gas LLC (suppliers of compressed natural gas across Armenia), founded in 2002.
- Multi Leon LLC (suppliers of liquefied compressed natural gas across Armenia), founded in 2000, part of Multi Group since 2003.
- Multi Agro Beekeeping Scientific Production Center, founded in 2003, Arinj.
- Multi Rest House hotel complex, opened in 2007, Tsaghkadzor.
- Magas Invest CJSC (official representative of Hyundai in Armenia), opened in 2006.
- Multi City House CJSC, founded in 2007, Yerevan, Armenia.
- Global Motors CJSC (official representative of Lada in Armenia), founded in 2008.
- Multi Motors LLC (official representative of Opel and GAZ in Armenia), founded in 2008.
- Shustov Trade House CJSC (alcoholic beverage retailers), founded in 2008.
- Bellezza LLC (clothing importers), founded in 2008, Yerevan, Armenia.
- "AR-BE" Armenian-Belarusian Trading House LLC, founded in 2010.
- Kotayk Brewery LLC, founded in 1974, part of Multi Group since 2011, Abovyan.
- Onira Club LLC (Pharaon leisure and entertainment complex), opened in 2013, Yerevan-Abovyan highway.
- Olympavan LLC (Olympic training centre), opened in 2013, Yerevan.
- Multi Grand Hotel, opened in 2014, Yerevan-Abovyan highway.
- Firma New LLC ("Arinj Mall" shopping center), opened in 2015, Arinj.
- Multi Wellness Centre sports complex, opened in 2016, Yerevan.

Multi Group are also the owners of the Gorna Bania Water Bottling Company Ltd. based in Sofia, Bulgaria, founded in 1997.

=== Low income reporting and tax payments ===
Despite maintaining an extravagant lifestyle, Tsarukyan's companies post only modest revenues. His Ararat Cement factory, officially the most profitable of his businesses, occupies only the 45th place in the Armenian Statistical Service's annual ranking of tax payers, with tax contributions totaling 1.3 billion drams in 2007 (about US$3.8 million in 2007). In contrast, another smaller Ararat-based plant (which smelts gold ore) paid more taxes despite standing idle during much of 2007 due to a change of ownership.

Despite being lucrative, the vast majority of Tsarukyan's Multi Group businesses were not included in the list of the country's leading corporate taxpayers released by the Armenian government in early 2005.

== Awards and medals ==
In 2002, Tsarukyan was awarded with Grigor Lousavorich order by the Supreme Patriarch of all Armenians Garegin II, honoring his activity towards church construction.

In 2003, upon the decree determined by the then-president of Armenia Robert Kocharyan, the president of Armenian National Olympic Committee Tsarukyan, who had supported the development of RA sports, was honored with Movses Khorenatsi medal.

On 17 September 2008, upon the decree determined by then-president of Armenia Serzh Sargsyan, Tsarukyan was honored with "Services provided to the motherland" first rank medal for the great input he had in the development of RA sports and physical education.

On 11 May 2009, Tsarukyan was awarded with "European of the Year" by the International European movement.

On 12 September 2009, European Judo Federation honored NOCA president Tsarukyan with a gold medal.

== Personal life ==
Gagik Tsarukyan is married to Javahir Tsarukyan. They have 6 children.

== Video Materials ==
- THE SPEECH OF Prosperous Armenia Party LEADER GAGIK TSARUKYAN AT THE FOURTH CONGRESS OF THE PARTY on YouTube
- GAGIK TSARUKYAN RECEIVED THE RANK OF HONORABLE CITIZEN OF NOR-HACHN on YouTube
- GAGIK TSARUKYAN "WE MUST EVALUATE THE BEST ARMENIAN ATHLETE OF 20TH CENTURY" on YouTube
- Prosperous Armenia Party LEADER GAGIK TSARUKYAN WILL NOT PARTICIPATE IN "BJNI" COMPULSORY AUCTION on YouTube
- GAGIK TSARUKYAN STATES HIS POINT OF VIEW TOWARDS WORLD FINANCIAL CRISIS on YouTube
- GAGIK TSARUKYAN " THERE WILL BE NO JOB DESTRUCTION" on YouTube
- GAGIK TSARUKYAN "Animal Cruelty"
