= Ararat (brandy) =

Brand of Armenian brandy

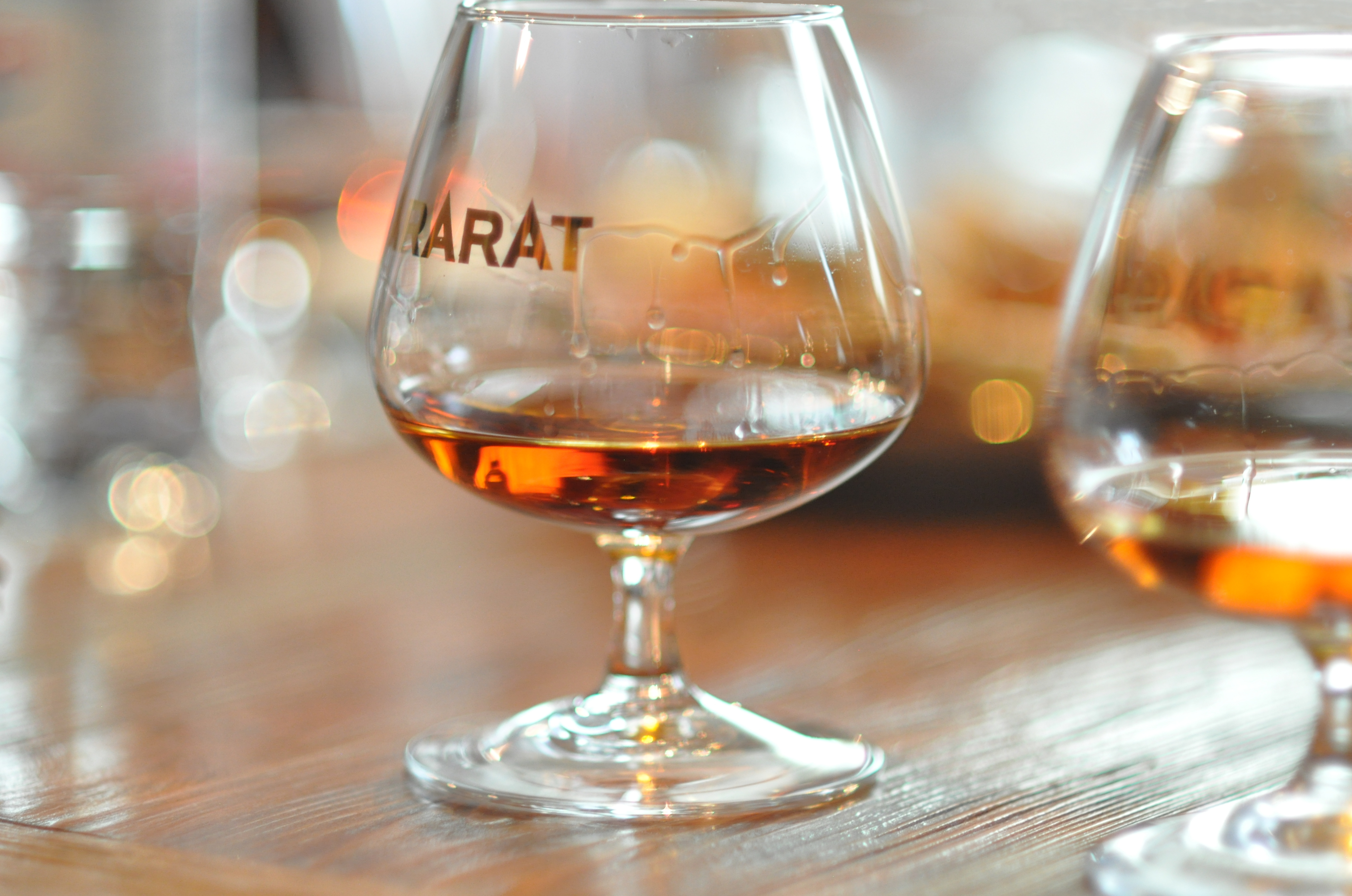
- Product type: Brandy
- Current owner: Pernod Ricard
- Country: Armenia
- Introduced: 1877
- Previous owners: Yerevan Brandy Company
- Website: ybc.am

Ararat (stylized as ArArAt) is a brand of Armenian brandy produced 10 years before the Yerevan Brandy Company was established (1877). It is made from white grapes and spring water, according to a traditional method. The brand's "ordinary brandies" are aged between 3 and 6 years. Its "aged brandies" are between 10 and 30 years old.

Ararat brandy is primarily sold in countries of the former USSR, chief among them Russia, Georgia, Ukraine and Belarus. In the Russian-speaking countries of the former Soviet Union, the Armenian brandy is marketed as cognac (Russian: армянский коньяк, romanized: armjanskij konjak).

A widely spread story exists about the brandy by Russian company "Choustov and sons" winning the Grand Prix award at the Exposition Universelle in Paris in 1900 that allowed Ararat to legally call their brandy "cognac" until it was revoked after WWII. However, this story is regarded as untruthful by some sources and "Choustov" appears on the list of Paris Grand Prix winners under section «Sirops et liqueurs; spiritueux divers; alcools d’industrie» and not «Vins et eaux-de-vie de vin», where cognacs were presented.

In any case, the term "brandy" has never really caught on in the region.

== In politics ==
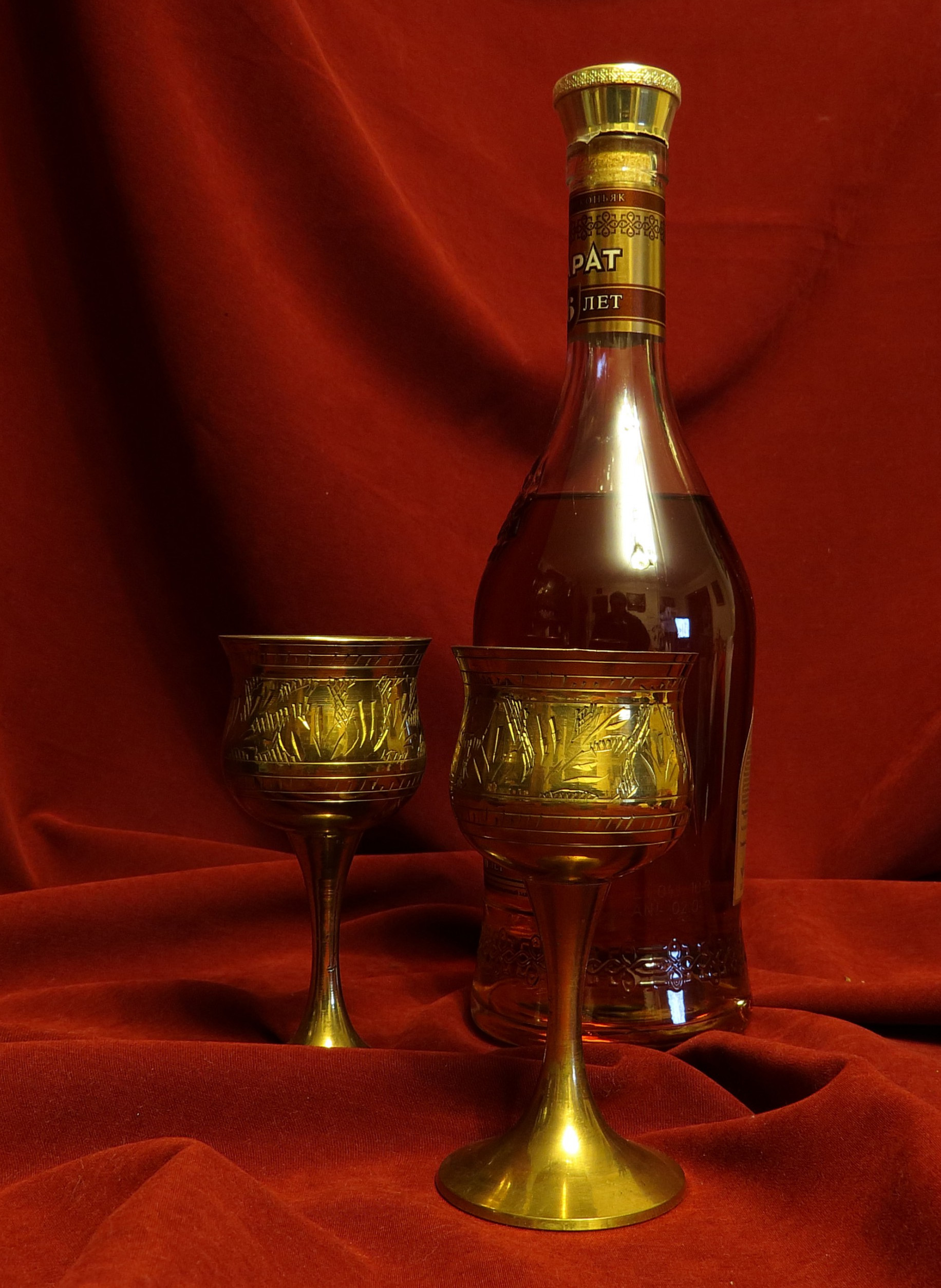
A bottle of Ararat brandy

An undocumented story claims that during the Yalta Conference, Winston Churchill was so impressed with the Armenian brandy Dvin given to him by Joseph Stalin that he asked for several cases of it to be sent to him each year. Reportedly 400 bottles of Dvin were shipped to Churchill annually. This brandy was named in honour of the ancient capital Dvin, and was first produced in 1943.

During a 2013 meeting at his personal villa in Sochi, Russian president Vladimir Putin gave British Prime Minister David Cameron a bottle of Armenian brandy as a gift, recalling Stalin's offering to Churchill in 1945.

== Brands ==
- Ararat Erebuni, collection 30, 50 and 70 years old.
- Ararat Taste, collection Apricot, Cherry, Coffee and Honey.
- Ararat Nairi, 20 years old.
- Ararat, 3 and 5 years old.
- Ararat Akhtamar, 10 years old.
- Ararat Otborny, 7 years old.
- Ararat Ani, 7 years old.
- Ararat Dvin, 25 years old.
- Ararat Armenia, collection.
- Ararat Vaspurakan, 15 years old.

Retired brands include:

- Ararat Tonakan, 15 years old.
- Ararat Kilikia, 30 years old.
- Ararat Sparapet, 40 years old.
- Ararat Noah's Ark, 70 years old.

== See also ==
- Noy (brandy)
- Yerevan Brandy Company
