= Ingo Armenia =

Coordinates: 40°10′36.97″N 44°31′13.89″E

INGO ARMENIA ICJSC.
- Type: Private
- Industry: Insurance
- Founded: 1997
- Headquarters: Yerevan, Armenia
- Area served: Worldwide
- Key people: Rafik Suvaryan (CEO), Aleksey Ilyushenko (Board Chairman)
- Products: General Insurance, Life Insurance
- Net income: ▲US $0.6 million (2019)
- Total assets: ▲US $28.2 million (2019)
- Total equity: ▲US $9.1 million (2019)
- Number of employees: 240 (2020)
- Parent: Ingosstrakh IPJSC

INGO ARMENIA ICJSC (Russian: СЗАО «ИНГО АРМЕНИЯ»), generally known simply as Ingo Armenia, is an insurance company located in Yerevan, Armenia. Its products and services include, but are not limited to, CMPTL, property, health, personal accidents, liability insurance, as well as unique offerings for Armenian market such as agricultural, motor, cyber and cargo insurance packages.

Ingo Armenia was founded in 1997, and acquired by Ingosstrakh IPJSC in 2003, which for more than 70 years is one of the leading insurance companies in Russia. Currently, Ingo Armenia is the largest insurance provider in Armenia, and is 132nd of the Top 400 Taxpayers of Armenia, by 2019 rankings.

== History ==
Armenian insurance market is relatively new, as it started developing from 1996, when was for the first time adopted Law on Insurance in Armenia. Not long after, in 1997 Ingo Armenia was founded by Levon Altunyan. Afterwards, along with the market the company started its expansion, while enriching its customer base and building trust with its partners.

In December 2003, one of the largest Russian insurance companies “Ingosstrakh” acquired entity's 75% of shares.

While in 2006, the control of insurance market transitioned from Ministry of Finance and Economy of RA to Central Bank of Armenia, Ingo Armenia was relicensed and received a non-life insurance license from CBA APO 0005 (0014). In 2009 it was the first insurance company to be included in the list of 400 major taxpayers of Armenia.

In 2010, in the pursuit to solve major social issues CBA introduced Compulsory Motor Third Party Liability Insurance requirement, that boosted the popularity of insurance companies. As of the next year-end, Ingo Armenia had 12 specialized offices for the regulation of insurance claims and more than 400 branches and representative officers, which ensured the company's exhaustive coverage in all regions of Armenia.

In the first quarter of 2012, Ingo Armenia announced its acquisition of Cascade Insurance CJSC, which was the daughter organization of Cascade Capital Holdings CJSC owned by US based Cafesjian Family Foundation. The latter had almost 5,000 individual and corporate customers. The key factor making this acquisition happen was the two companies’ similarity to each other in regard to their spirit and working practices.

Garnik Tonoyan, executive director of Cascade Insurance, during one of his interviews mentioned that this merger was dictated by the market, as there was a strong need for capable insurance firm with solid infrastructure to supply its operations.

2017 was not only significant because of the company's 20th anniversary, but also was crucial as the company embarked on its journey of digitalization. With the launch of its newborn strategy, Ingo Armenia was the first Armenian insurance firm to sell CMTPL contracts online. Other approaches were digitalization of document circulation, remote accident management and more.

Historically, the company's focus was concentrating on corporate clients. However, from 2017 up to now, Ingo Armenia introduced new products to attract retail market.

In 2023, Rafik Suvaryan was appointed Executive Director of INGO Armenia,

== Corporate Governance ==
For solid 20 years, from 1997 to 2017, Ingo Armenia was a traditional insurance company, with branches and representatives across the whole territory of Armenia. However it was incongruent with the company's move toward digitalization. In 2017, Ingo Armenia initiated complete restructuring to facilitate its changed operations. The company reduced its branches to:

- Head Office: 51,53 Hanrapetutyan Str., 0010, Yerevan, RA․

Ingo Armenia currently has flat organizational structure that increases flexibility and improves communication across all divisions.

The company has two major shareholders: InVest-Polis JSC and Levon Altunyan. Ingosstrakh IPJSC is the parent organization of InVest-Polis JSC, with full controlling interest package.

Shareholder Name	Ownership	Participation in Authorized Capital	Number of Shares
InVest-Polis JSC	75%	US $3.97 million	3,093
Levon Altunyan	25%	US $1.32 million	1,031

== Business ==
=== Products ===
Ingo Armenia offers a wide range of products to its both B2B and B2C customers. The company's focal activity is the provision of general insurance. It has nearly 240 employees and 160,000 customers as of 2020. Brief summary of its main offerings is reflected in the table below.

Product	Retail	Corporate
Agriculture	✓	✓
Aviation Risks	✗	✓
Cargo	✗	✓
CMTPL	✓	✓
Construction Works	✗	✓
Financial Risks	✗	✓
Health	✓	✓
Liability	✗	✓
Motor	✓	✓
Personal Accidents	✓	✓
Property	✓	✓
Safe Holidays	✗	✓
Travel	✓	✓

As the company's recent target is penetrating retail market, Ingo Armenia developed number of unique offerings that were absent from current product range. The most prominent of those, was Ingocare Health Insurance exclusive product, which enabled independent individuals to acquire medical insurance for their family members and them. This facilitated the company to be a leader not only in corporate medical insurance, but also in individual insurance. Other innovative products are Apartments and Private Houses insurance packet, CASCO Plus and CASCO Seasons that are special products distinctive to Armenian market.

== Finances ==
The company's financial performance is largely dependent upon the state of Armenian business environment as it is still in its developing stage and has a rather volatile nature. In recent years, the government has brought a renewed commitment to good governance, including anticorruption efforts, transparency, and accountability, which infuses economy participants, including Ingo Armenia with optimism toward the future.

The financial statements of the company have been prepared in accordance with International Financial Reporting Standards (IFRS) as developed and published by the International Accounting Standards Board (IASB), and International Financial Reporting Standards Foundation (IFRS Foundation).

Functional currency of Ingo Armenia is the currency of the primary economic environment in which the company operates. The company's functional currency and presentation currency is Armenian Dram (AMD)․

Below are the summarized figures of Ingo Armenia's performance for the recent years, converted in USD.

US $	Gross Premiums Written	Net Profit	Gross Claims Incurred	Total Equity
2019	▲27,905,812	▲563,342	▼14,454,409	▲9,117,973
2018	▲20,978,533	▼424,779	▲11,232,680	▲8,160,283
2017	▲19,134,434	▼1,035,271	▲9,894,481	▼7,761,543
2016	▲17,867,291	▲1,941,043	▼7,220,622	▲8,208,767
2015	▲16,821,248	▲1,002,194	▲7,486,293	▲6,413,101
2014	▼15,256,943	▲949,145	▼7,434,695	▼5,337,156
2013	▼18,786,343	▼ (1,353,526)	▲9,848,294	▼7,100,432
2012	22,354,587	282,376	8,632,599	7,537,354

=== Reinsurance ===
Some of Ingo Armenia's multinational reinsurance partners are:

Company Name	Ownership
Lloyd's Market	A+
Allianz SE	AA
AIG Europe S.A	A+
Hannover RE	AA−
Chubb European Group SE	AA
SCOR SE	AA−
Korean Reinsurance Company	A
