= Ararat, Armenia =

City in Ararat, Armenia

Ararat Արարատ
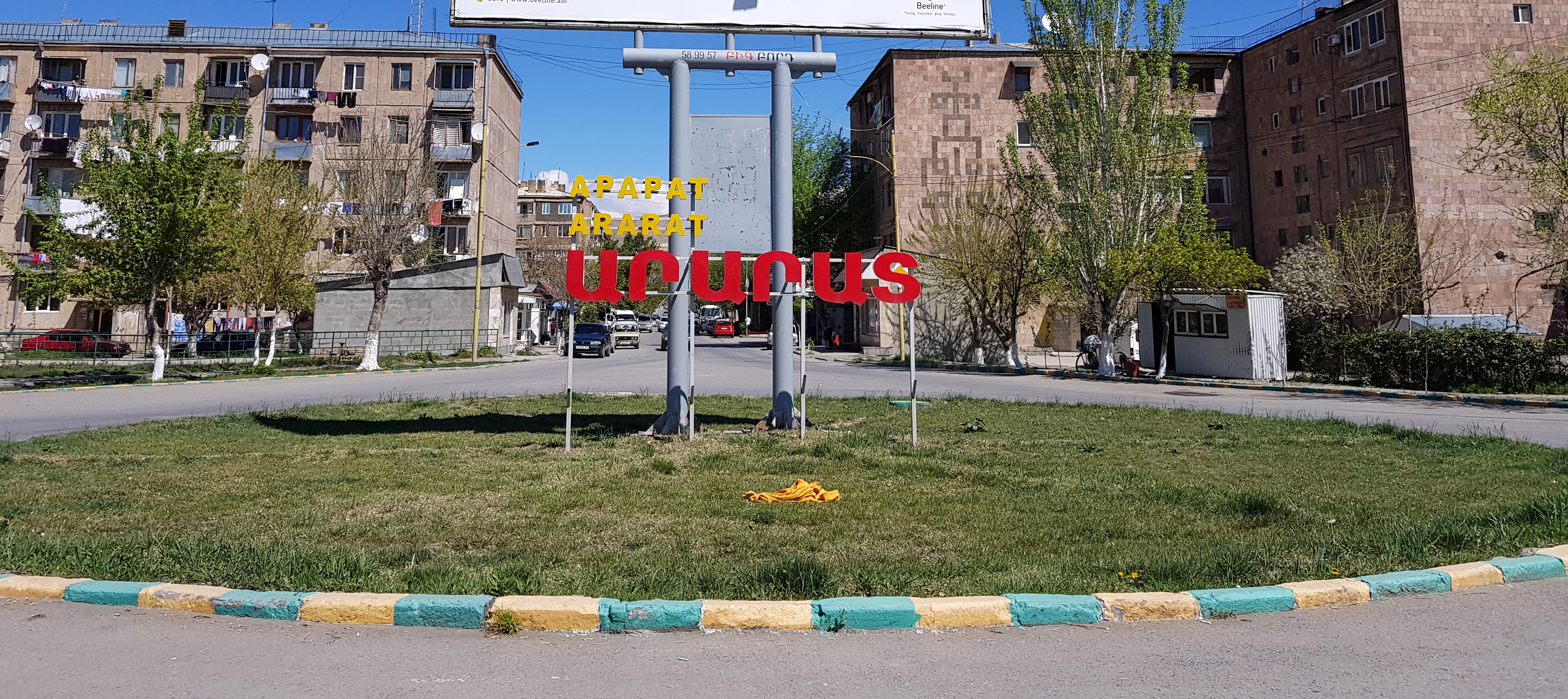
- Ararat town entrance

- Location within Armenia Location within Ararat
- Coordinates: 39°48′34″N 44°42′52″E
- Country: Armenia
- Province: Ararat
- Municipality: Ararat
- Founded: 1930

Area
  - Total: 6 km^{2} (2.3 sq mi)
- Elevation: 825 m (2,707 ft)

Population (2022 census)
  - Total: 16,592
  - Density: 2,800/km^{2} (7,200/sq mi)
- Time zone: UTC+4
- Website: Official website

Ararat (Armenian: Արարատ) is a town in the Ararat Municipality of the Ararat Province of Armenia, located on the Yerevan-Nakhchivan highway, 42 km (26 mi) southeast of the capital Yerevan and 19 km (12 mi) south of the provincial centre Artashat. In the 2011 census, the population of the town was 20,235. As per the 2016 official estimate, the population is around 20,300. In the 2022 census, the population of the town was 16,592.

== Etymology ==
The town was officially named Ararat in 1947 after the nearby biblical Mountains of Ararat.

== History ==
The foundation of the Ararat cement was launched in 1927 within Soviet Armenia, accompanied by the construction of few residential apartments to accommodate the workers. In 1930, the settlement was officially formed as a labour accommodation area, while the cement plant gave its first production in 1933. In 1935, the settlement was enlarged with the inclusion of the surrounding rural areas. In 1947, it was officially named Ararat after the nearby biblical Mountains of Ararat.

With the establishment of several industrial plants, Ararat was developed as a major industrial centre of the Armenian SSR, to become an urban-type settlement. Due to its rapid growth and the gradual increase of the population, Ararat was given the status of a town in 1962. In 1972, it became a city of Republican subordination.

After the independence of Armenia, Ararat was included within the Ararat Province, formed through the merger of Masis, Artashat and Ararat raions of the Armenian SSR, as per the 1995 administrative divisions' law of Armenia.

== Geography and climate ==
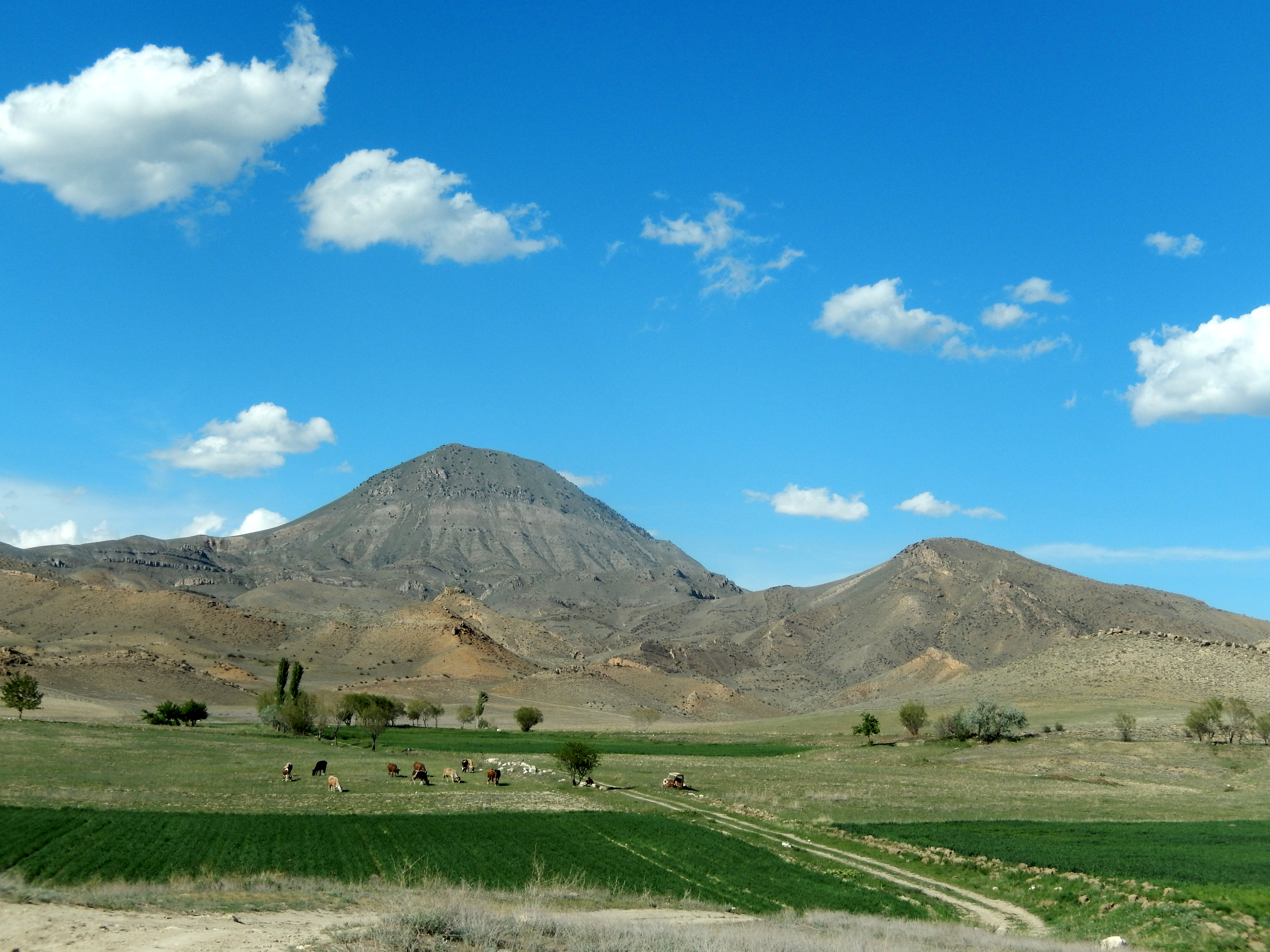
The mountains of Urts at the north and east of Ararat

Ararat is situated at the east of the central part of modern-day Armenia, occupying the southeastern part of the Ararat plain, only 7 km east of Araks river on the Armenia-Turkey border. Historically, the current territory of the town was part of the Vostan Hayots canton of Ayrarat province of Ancient Armenia.

At an approximate height of 825 meters above sea level, the town is surrounded by the villages of Avshar at the northwest, and Ararat at the west and the south. The Goravan Sands Sanctuary is located at the northeast of the town, while the mountains of Urts dominate over the town from the east and the north.

The town is generally characterized with an extremely arid climate and classified as cool desert climate (Köppen BWk), with low precipitation levels. Winters are cold and snowy, while summers are long and hot.

The ecology of the town is in danger due to emissions of cement dust and cyanide from the gold manufacturing plant. In summer 2005, the impurity of the atmosphere was recorded to be 9.6 times the acceptable norm.

Climate data for Ararat (1991-2020)
Month	Jan	Feb	Mar	Apr	May	Jun	Jul	Aug	Sep	Oct	Nov	Dec	Year
Record high °C (°F)	16.4 (61.5)	19.0 (66.2)	27.8 (82.0)	34.5 (94.1)	35.3 (95.5)	39.5 (103.1)	42.6 (108.7)	42.2 (108.0)	39.3 (102.7)	31.7 (89.1)	26.4 (79.5)	21.9 (71.4)	42.6 (108.7)
Daily mean °C (°F)	−2.5 (27.5)	1.0 (33.8)	7.8 (46.0)	13.6 (56.5)	18.3 (64.9)	23.3 (73.9)	26.8 (80.2)	26.6 (79.9)	21.5 (70.7)	14.4 (57.9)	6.2 (43.2)	−0.1 (31.8)	13.1 (55.5)
Record low °C (°F)	−27.0 (−16.6)	−23.5 (−10.3)	−9.6 (14.7)	−6.0 (21.2)	1.5 (34.7)	6.5 (43.7)	10.0 (50.0)	11.5 (52.7)	2.4 (36.3)	−2.5 (27.5)	−11.0 (12.2)	−31.6 (−24.9)	−31.6 (−24.9)
Average precipitation mm (inches)	18.2 (0.72)	17.9 (0.70)	24.5 (0.96)	40.0 (1.57)	34.3 (1.35)	18.8 (0.74)	11.9 (0.47)	5.6 (0.22)	9.1 (0.36)	16.4 (0.65)	19.4 (0.76)	16.4 (0.65)	232.5 (9.15)
Average precipitation days (≥ 1.0 mm)	3.5	3.6	4.4	6.5	6.8	4	2.1	1.3	1.9	4.1	3.9	3.8	45.9
Average relative humidity (%)	77.3	69.3	59.1	57.3	56.8	50.8	47.7	47.2	51.9	63	70.2	78.2	60.7
Source: NOAA

== Demographics ==
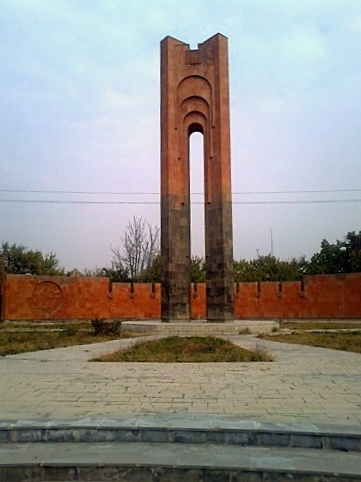
World War II memorial in Ararat

Historical population
Year	Pop.	±% p.a.
1926	45	—
1939	2,329	+35.47%
1959	5,412	+4.31%
1976	15,000	+6.18%
2001	20,480	+1.25%
2011	20,235	−0.12%
2022	16,592	−1.79%

== Culture ==
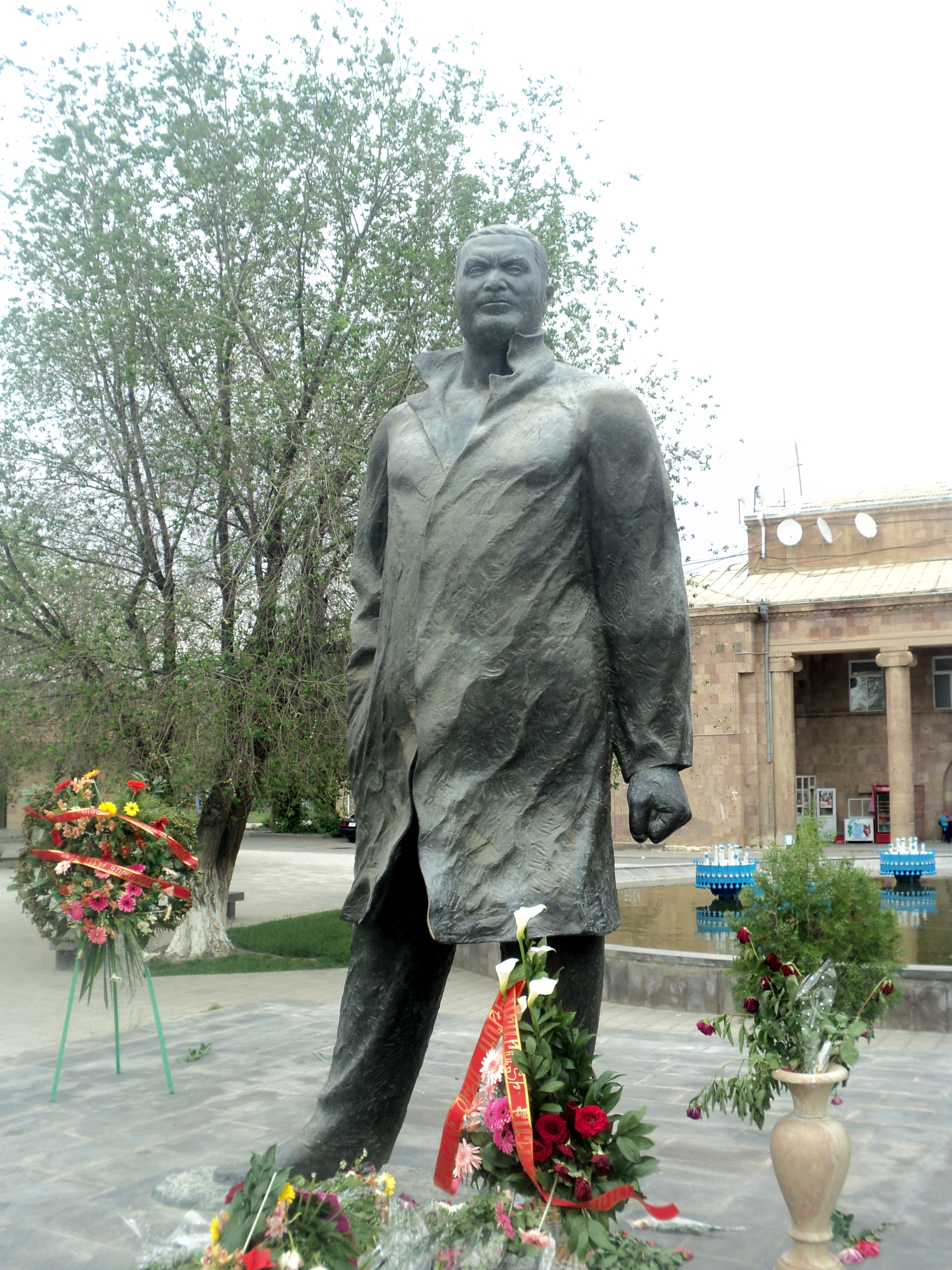
The statue of Vazgen Sargsyan at the central square

Ararat has a cultural palace located at the central square near the town hall. The town is also home to an art academy, a sports school and a youth creativity centre.

On 16 September 2009, the statue of sparapet Vazgen Sargsyan was erected at the central town square of Ararat.

== Transportation ==
Ararat is a major point on the M-2 Motorway that connects the capital Yerevan with southern Armenia reaching up to the Iranian border.

The town has a railway station that is served by commuter trains to Yerevan and Yeraskh. It used to connect Yerevan with the Nakhchivan Autonomous Republic during the Soviet years.

== Economy ==
The town of Ararat is home to 2 major industrial firms: the Ararat Cement factory founded in 1927, and the "Geopromining Gold" recovery plant operating since 1970. Other enterprises include the "AKZ Ararat Cognac Factory" for brandy and wine, opened in 1932 in the nearby village of Avshar.

=== Controversy over the Ararat Gold Company ===
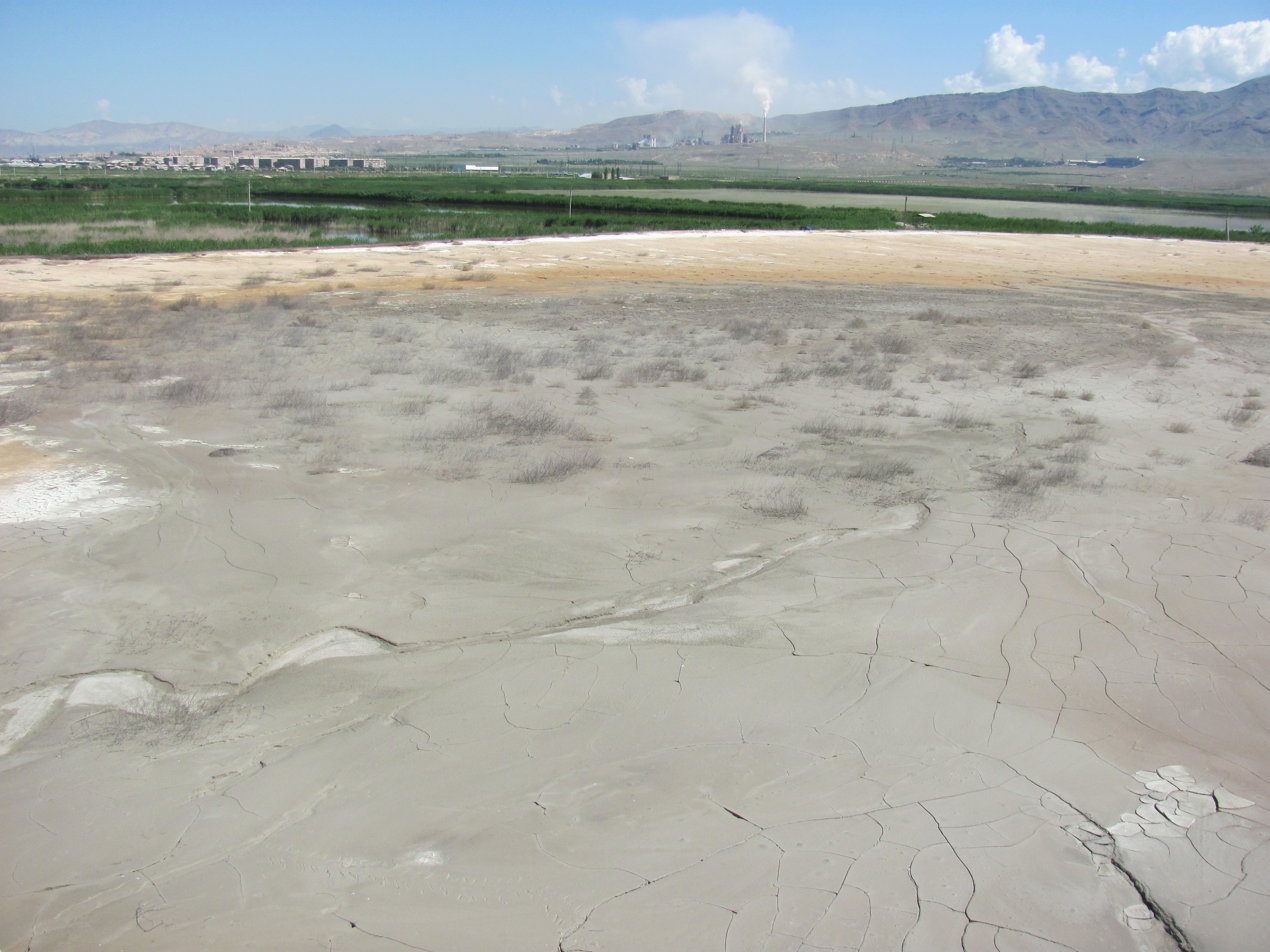
The massive toxic tailing pond of the Ararat gold processing facility with the town of Ararat in the background

Besides the various enterprises based on the manufacturing of building materials, the town is also home to the Geopromining Gold recovery plant of Ararat, which extracts gold from the raw ore sent from the gold mine in Sotk which is 20 kilometres (12 miles) east of Lake Sevan. About 0.46 grams of gold is extracted from each ton of sand unearthed at the mines. The extraction process involves first pulverizing the raw material, and then filtering out the gold using a cyanide nitrate chemical process.

The soupy byproduct of the cyanide nitrate chemical process is both toxic and radioactive and collects in a tailing pond. There have been numerous incidents of animals dying near and around the plant's area. Also, within the years 2003 and 2008, there have been at least 10 accidents at the plant, some of which have resulted in the discharge of the cyanide soup into neighboring agricultural lands and fisheries, killing off cows and fish stock.

== Education ==
As of 2016, Ararat has 4 public education schools. The town has also its medical centre and number of art, music and sport schools.

== Sport ==
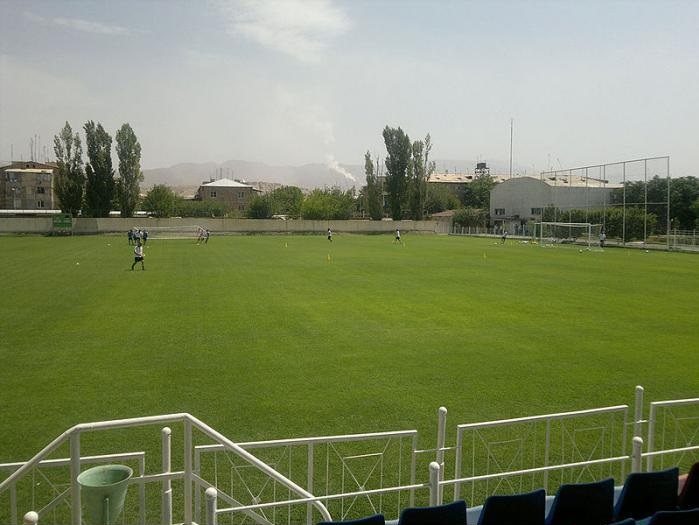
Ayg Stadium

Araks Ararat had represented the town in domestic and international football competitions. The club was founded in 1960 and dissolved in 2001 due to financial difficulties. They won the Armenian Premier League in 2 occasions: in 1998 as Tsement Ararat and in 2000 as Araks Ararat. In 2001, the president of Araks Ararat; Abraham Babayan was unable to finance the club. Consequently, the rights of the club were sold to a new sponsor based in Yerevan in August 2001, and Araks Ararat FC was dissolved.

At the end of 2001, another football club with the name of FC Araks was founded in the town, in an effort to keep the football traditions alive among the new generation of Ararat. However, after 4 years of major difficulties, the financially struggling club was dissolved in 2005.

The town is served by the all-seater Ayg Stadium with a capacity of 1,280 spectators. It is part of a large sport complex with many other structures including an indoor sports hall, indoor swimming pool, billiards saloon, mini-football ground and other facilities.

The retired Olympic cyclist Arsen Ghazaryan is a native of Ararat.

== International relations ==
=== Twin towns – Sister cities ===
Ararat is twinned with

- Bussy-Saint-Georges, since 7 August 2009

== See also ==
- Ararat (village), Armenia
- Ararat Cement
- Ararat, Victoria
