= Postage stamps and postal history of Armenia =

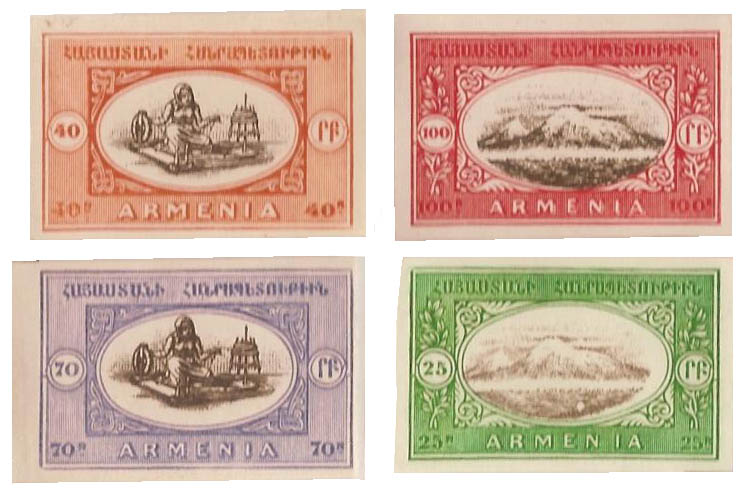
These Arshak Fetvadjian designed stamps if genuine were never used in Armenia and are most likely forgeries.

The postage stamps and postal history of Armenia describes the history of postage stamps and postal systems in Armenia. Czarist Russian postmarks and stamps were in used in the territory of Armenia from 1858. The early postmarks were composed of dots in different shapes. Dated postmarks with city names soon followed. Many counterfeit postmarks are known. From 1909 until 1918 a few Russian stamps were overprinted identifying the Armenian Post. The Armenian letters H & P are intertwined, representing the initials of hai post, the Armenian Post Office.

== First Republic of Armenia ==
The First Republic of Armenia was founded on May 28, 1918, but stamps were first issued in 1919 overprinted on Russia. In 1919 Arshak Fetvadjian was commissioned to design and supervise production of stamps for the new republic. Ten stamps were designed in different denominations and printed in Paris. Due to the occupation of Armenia they were never delivered and few were printed, so no genuine uses are known and many forged stamps are recorded. The stamps were sold to stamp collectors and dealers in Paris during 1924 and Hovanesian suggests that the Armenian government in exile (Dashnak Party) did this because they needed money to finance their activities.

== Armenian Soviet Socialist Republic ==
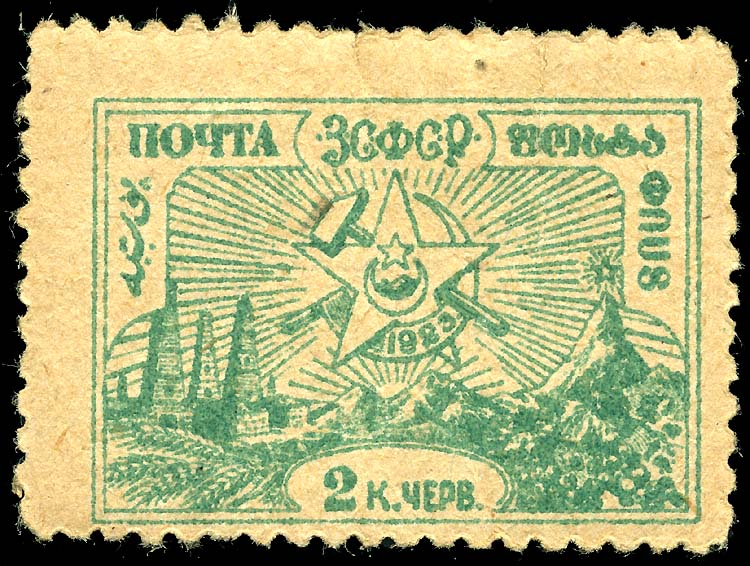
1923 Transcaucasian stamp

Between 1922 and 1991 Armenia was initially part of the Transcaucasian Socialist Federative Soviet Republic which officially became the Armenian SSR in 1936. From 1922 the country issued its own definitives; and from 1923 used overprinted Russian stamps, and as a constituent of the Transcaucasian Federation, that specifically produced 15 stamps of their own, used the federation stamps though they were only in use until 1924. These stamps are known both perforated and imperforate and the 40,000 Rs and 75,000 Rs stamps were also surcharged with an overprint 700,000 Rs. From 1924, upon a decree from the central government of the USSR, only regular Soviet Union issued stamps were in use until November 1991. During this period several stamps with Armenian nationalistic and ethnic topics were issued by the central government, such as a 1950 set of three stamps to commemorate the 30th anniversary of the founding of the Soviet Armenian Republic, views of Erevan with Mount Ararat in 1960, and Armenian national costumes in 1961 and notable Armenian personalities.

== Post-Soviet independence ==
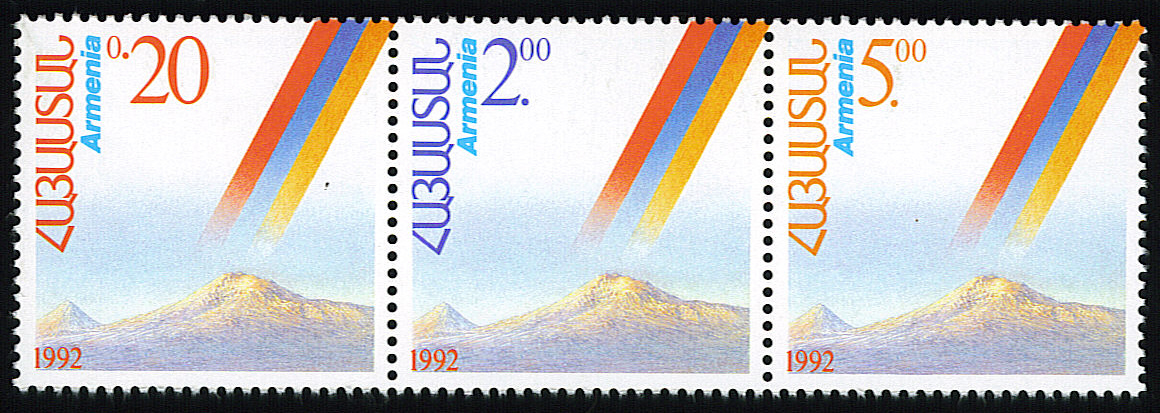
1992 – first stamps of the new Republic of Armenia

Following the end of the Cold War and the breakup of the Soviet Union, Armenia became an independent state on September 21, 1991, though the first stamps, a se-tenant trio, were issued on April 28, 1992, to commemorate Independence Day. On July 26, another set of four stamps was issued for the 1992 Barcelona Summer Olympic Games before the first new definitives appeared on August 25 of the same year. Other definitives depict such topics as, religious artefacts, landscapes, David of Sasun and the 1993 International Philatelic Exhibition.

The first stamps to be issued in the new Armenian currency, the dram, that was introduced to replace the rouble used for the previous issues since independence, appeared on August 4, 1994, illustrating treasures of Etchmiadzin. Notable people stamps were issued for Levon Shant and Yervand Otian in 1994 along with four new definitives and Christianity themed stamps.

== See also ==
- HayPost

== References and sources ==
Notes

Sources

- Stanley Gibbons Ltd: various catalogues
- Hovanesian, Zareh (2000). The Philatelic History of Armenia. Old Tappan, New Jersey: Self-published. p. 357.
- Rossiter, Stuart & Fowler, John (1991). World History Stamp Atlas (reprint ed.). Black Cat. ISBN 0-7481-0309-0.
