= Kotayk Brewery =

Brewing company

Kotayk Brewery LLC
- Industry: Alcoholic beverage
- Founded: 1974
- Headquarters: Abovyan, Kotayk Province; Armenia
- Products: Beer
- Production output: 500,000 hl
- Owner: Arash Nosratialamdari 50% and Garik Mkrtchyan 50%

Kotayk Brewery (Armenian: «Կոտայք» գարեջրի գործարան /koʊˈtaɪk/), is a brewing company founded in 1974 in Abovyan, Kotayk Province, Armenia.

== History ==
Kotayk Brewery was founded in 1974, as a state-owned enterprise by the government of the Armenian Soviet Socialist Republic, with a limited scale of production. After the completion of the entire equipment, the factory started large-scale production in 1978.

After the dissolution of the Soviet Union, Gagik Tsarukyan took over the brewery in 1995 and started to produce beer under the brands Kotayk and Artsakh. In 1997, Castel Group became the major shareholders of the brewery through an investment of US$17 million, being one of the earliest foreign investors in Armenia. In March 2006, Tsarukyan sold his 29% share in the brewery to Castel Group for US$4 million. However, the company was sold back to Gagik Tsarukyan's Multi Group Concern in June 2011, to become a limited liability company. On 11 February 2022, Gagik Tsarukyan completed a full sale of the factory, transferring 100% of its shares to businessmen Arash Nosratialamdari and Garik Mkrtchyan in a commercial transaction. After the sale, both became equal 50% owners.

== Production ==
The brewery produces six varieties of beer:

- Kotayk Gold (alc. 4.7%)
- Kotayk Lager (alc. 4.2%)
- Kotayk Tshani (alc. 4.5%)
- Erebuni Strong (alc. 6.4%)
- Erebuni (alc. 4.7%)
- Urartu (alc. 4%)
