= Yerevan Ararat Brandy Factory =

Armenian alcohol producer

Coordinates: 40°10′25″N 44°30′04″E

Yerevan Ararat Brandy-Wine-Vodka Factory "NOY"
- Company type: Open Joint-Stock Company
- Industry: Drinks
- Founded: 1877
- Headquarters: Yerevan, Armenia
- Products: Brandy, Whisky
- Owner: Multi Group Concern
- Website: Official website

Yerevan Ararat Brandy Factory, officially known as the Yerevan Ararat Brandy-Wine-Vodka Factory (Armenian: Երևանի Արարատ կոնյակի-գինու-օղու կոմբինատ), commonly known by its famous brand Noy, is a leading Armenian brandy production company in Yerevan, Armenia, currently owned by Gagik Tsarukyan's Multi Group Concern. It was founded in 1877 during the rule of the Russian Empire. The factory is located on the left bank of the Hrazdan River at the centre of Yerevan, occupying the area of the historic Erivan Fortress.

== History ==
Nerses Tairyan was a well-known merchant and philanthropist. In 1877 he started industrial production of wine, and later brandy in 1887, at the territory of the former Erivan Fortress. Hovhannes Aivazovsky, who was a relative of Tairyan, helped him to build the factory.

In 1899 Nerses Tairyan leased the factory to Nikolay Shustov, who purchased it a year later for 50,000 roubles. Having established his own business in Moscow in 1863, Shustov became one of the first producers of brandy in Russia. Already in the 1870s "Shustov and Sons" company managed to take into its hands 80% of brandy-wine-vodka-liqueur production in the Russian Empire. In 1901 Nikolay Shustov sent samples of brandy to an exhibition in Paris.

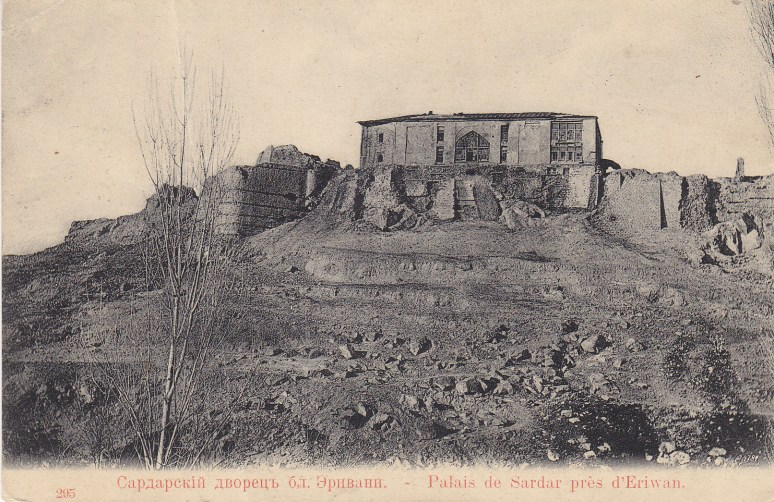
Former Sardar palace. The building of the factory was built on the site of this palace

In 1899 Shustov invited Kyrill Silchenko, who had just finished Nikitin's school of wine-making, to work at the factory.

The current facilities of the Yerevan Ararat Brandy Factory were built in 1938 on the site of the former sardar palace of the Erivan Fortress. The building was designed by architect Rafael Israelyan.

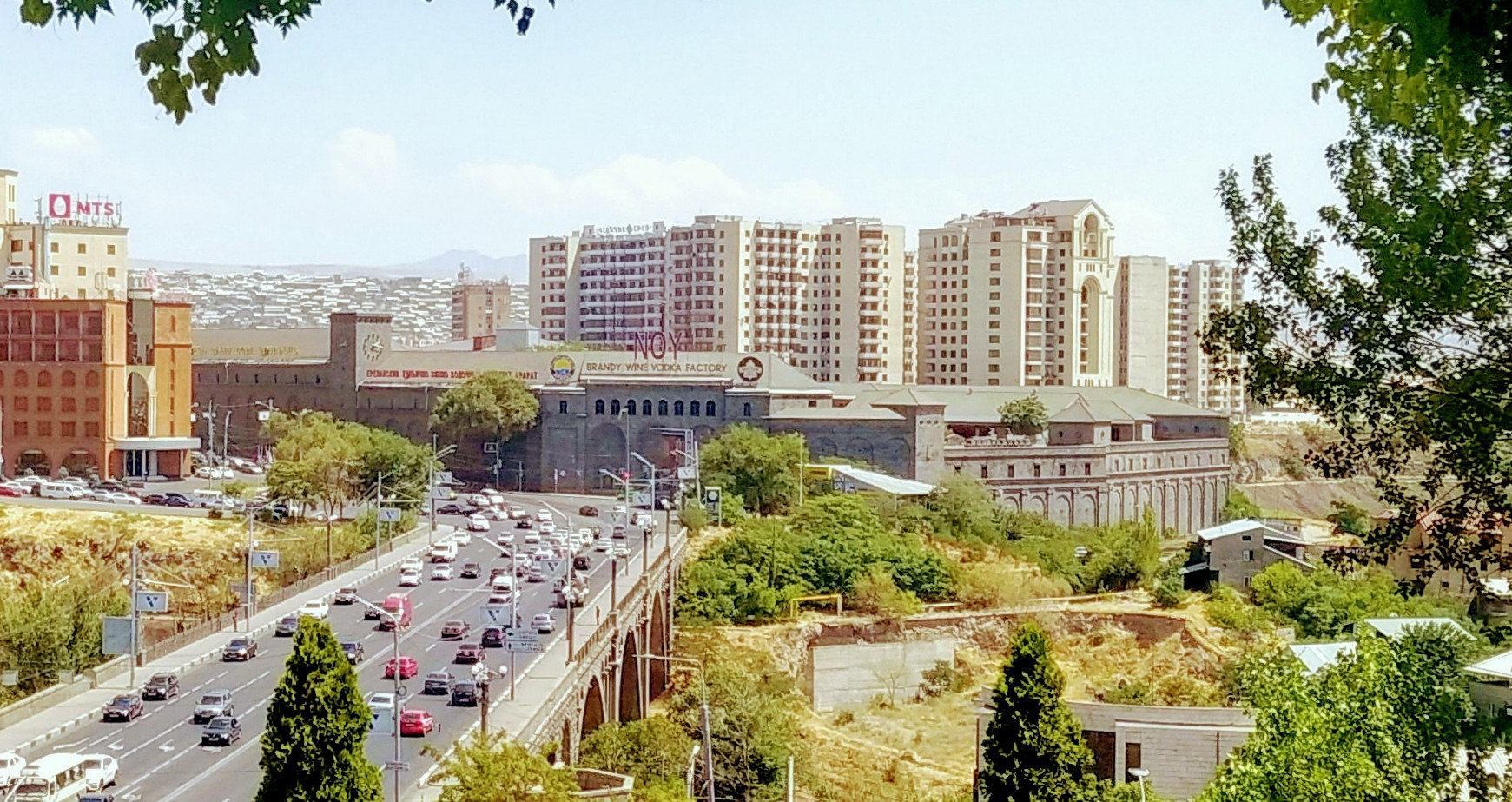
Yerevan Ararat Brandy Factory building

In 2002, the factory entered Multi Group Concern. Around US$50 million were invested into restoration and constructions, acquisition of new bottling line and oak barrels.

The factory currently produces several types of Armenian famous brandies including "Noy" and "Araspel". "Noy" is a worldwide well known brandy especially in with its 25-year-old "Brandy Noy Tirakal".

The factory houses a museum that features the history of the factory as well as the notable figures who worked for to the development of the factory.

== Production ==
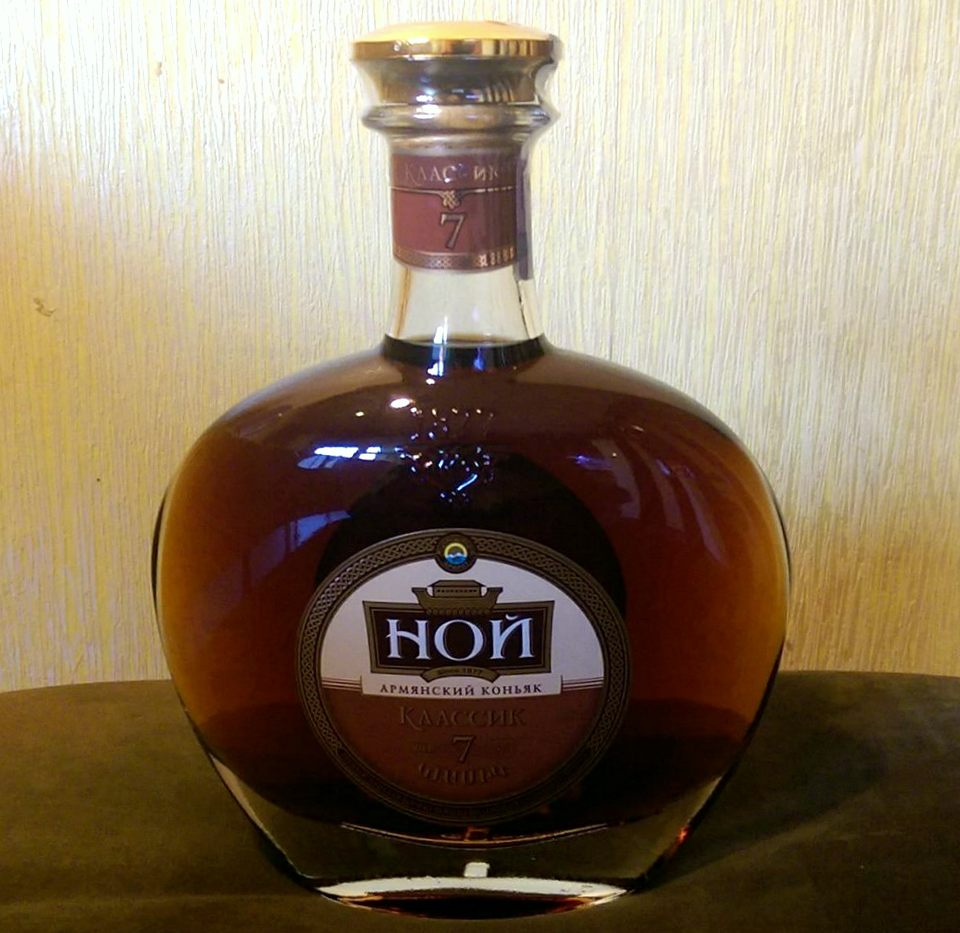
Noy Classic, 7 year-old Armenian brandy from Yerevan Ararat Brandy Factory

The factory is mainly famous for its Noy and Kremlin Award Armenian brandy brands. The products are exported to many countries of the CIS and Europe, as well as the United States and Australia.

On 21 April 2016, the factory presented its new products of "Noy 30" and "Noy 50" year old Armenian brandy. The ceremony took place in the Multi Grand Hotel at the north of Yerevan, with the presence of president Serzh Sargsyan.

Currently, the Yerevan Ararat Brandy Factory produces a variety of Armenian brandy, mainly under the brand NOY:

- NOY 50 Years Old.
- NOY 30 Years Old.
- NOY Tirakal, 25 years old.
- NOY Kremlin Award, 7, 10, 15 and 20 years old.
- NOY Classic, 7, 10, 15 and 20 years old.
- NOY Traditional, 3, 5, 7 and 10 years old.
- NOY Gift, 3, 5, 7 and 10 years old.
- NOY Araspel, 3 and 5 years old.
- NOY Régal by Uberto Gucci, 3 and 5 years old.
- NOY 140, collection.
- NOY 135, collection.

Other brandy brands produced by the factory include:

- Erivan Fortress, 3, 5 and 7 years old.
- Legends of Sevan, 3, 5 and 7 years old.
- Varpet, 3, 5 and 7 years old.

The factory has recently launched whisky production under 3 brands:

- Magarant, 3 years old de luxe whisky.
- Mac Ingal, 3 years old blended whisky.
- Old Clark, 3 years old de luxe whisky.

== See also ==
- Noy (brandy)
- Yerevan Brandy Company
- Yerevan Champagne Wines Factory
