= Yerevan Brandy Company =

Armenian brandy company

Coordinates: 40°10′36.02″N 44°29′49.83″E

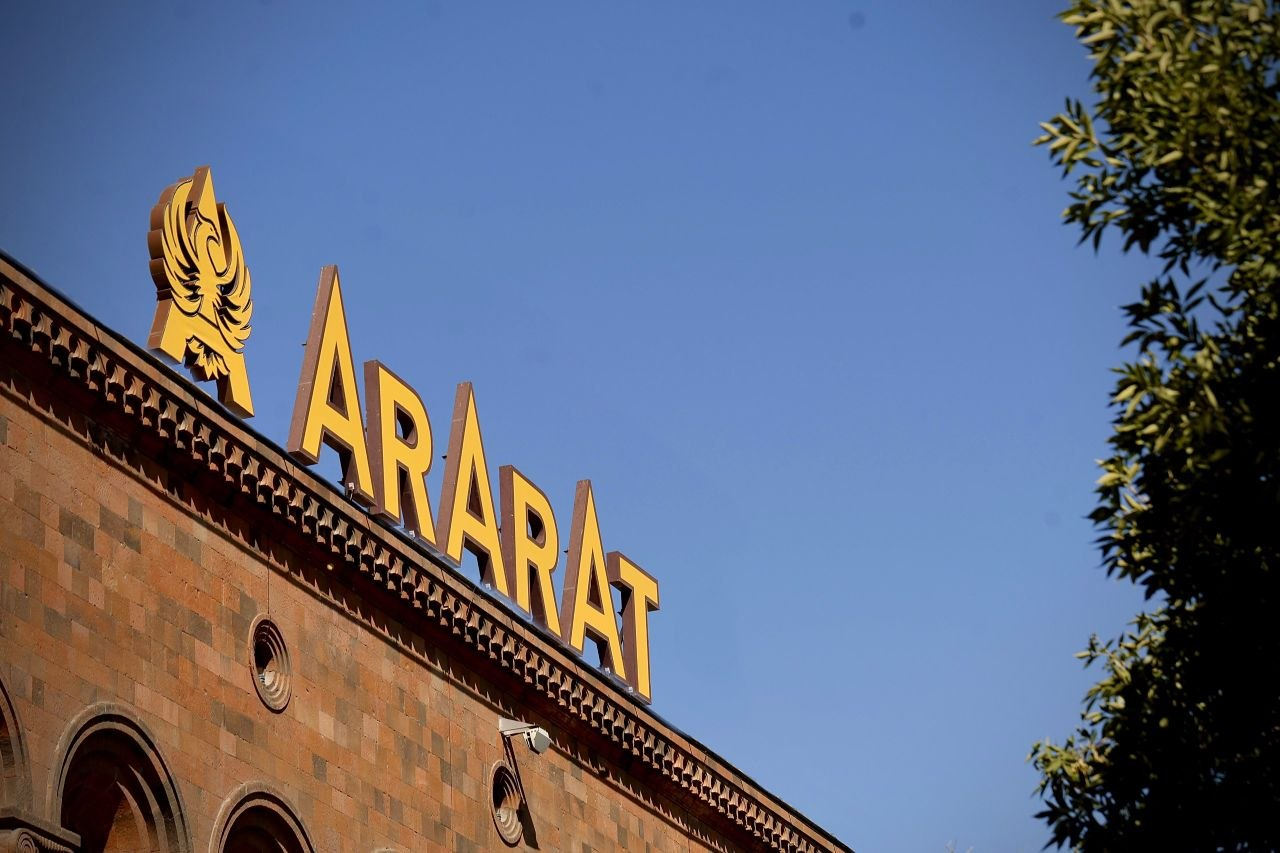

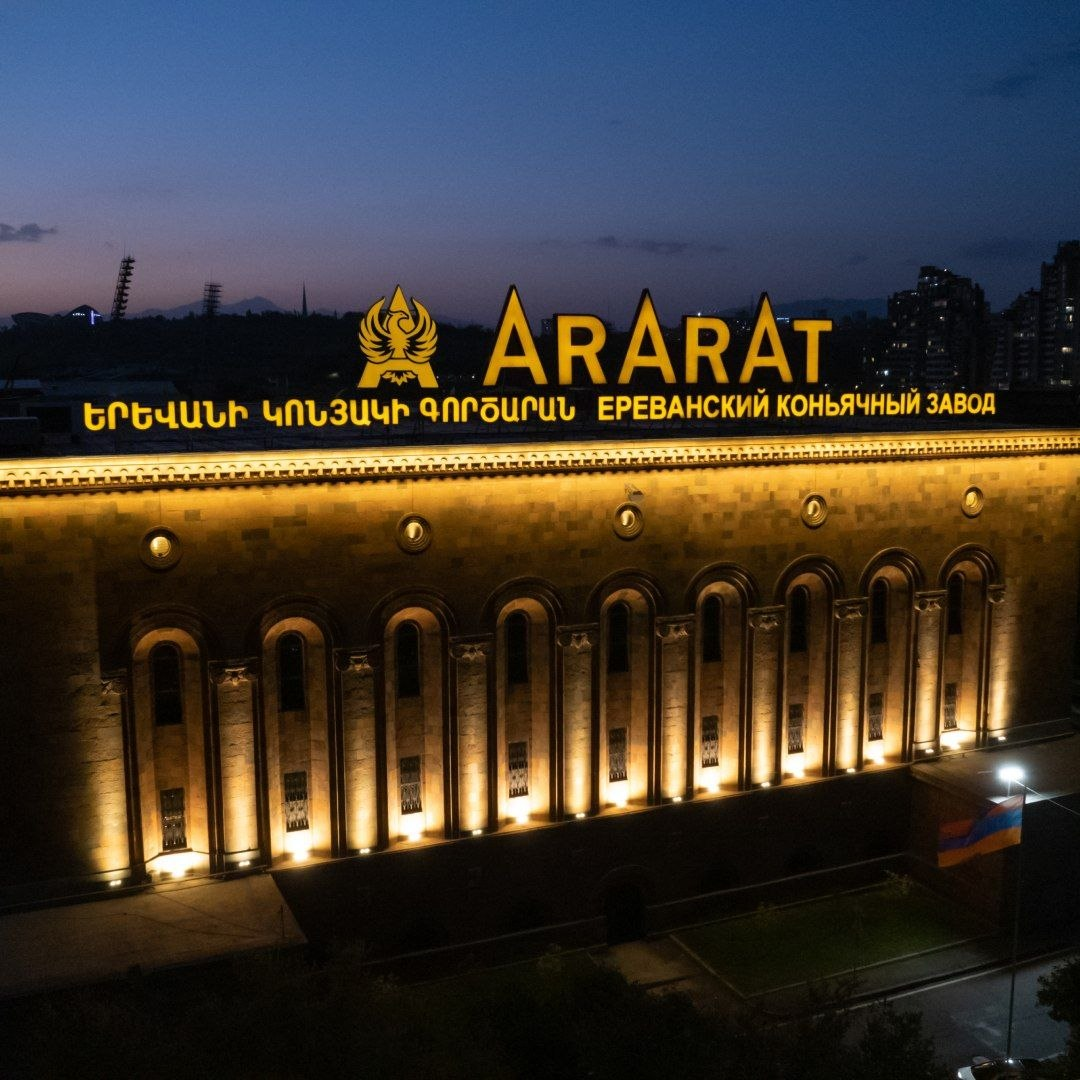
- Company type: Closed joint-stock company
- Industry: Drinks
- Founded: 1887
- Headquarters: Yerevan, Armenia
- Products: Alcoholic beverages
- Website: araratbrandy.com/en/

The Yerevan Brandy Company (YBC, Armenian: Երևանի Կոնյակի Գործարան (Yerevani Konyaki Gortsaran)) is one of Armenia’s leading alcoholic beverages producer. Its products are marketed under the ARARAT brand and distributed internationally.

== History ==
=== Foundation and early years ===
Brandy production in Armenia began in 1887, when merchant of the first guild Nerses Tairyan (Nerses Tairov) established a distillery in Yerevan. He was influenced by his brother Vasily Tairov, editor and founder of the wine industry journal Vestnik vinodeliya. Tairov brothers advanced production methods and adapted them to Armenia’s climatic and geographic conditions..

By the late 19th and early 20th centuries, the enterprise became part of the Shustov and Sons partnership..

In 1900, engineer and master blender Mkrtich Musinyants joined the distillery along with distiller Kirill Silchenko. Musinyants developed Fine-Champagne Otborny, one of the earliest blends of Armenian brandies. The product received recognition at the 1902 Bordeaux Exhibition, where it was acknowledged as meeting cognac production standards.

The company's products were also presented at the 1900 Exposition Universelle in Paris.

=== Soviet period ===
During the 1920s, Armenian distilleries were nationalized. In the Soviet era, the enterprise became part of a centralized wine and brandy trust overseeing production throughout Armenia.

In the 1930s, master blender Markar Sedrakyan joined the company and created his first vintage brandy, Jubilee.

Between the 1940s and 1950s, production expanded. A new factory building overlooking the Hrazdan River was constructed and completed in 1953, based on a design by architect Hovhannes Margaryan.

In the 1940s, the brandy ARARAT Dvin was created. According to a legend, it was highly appreciated by the Prime Minister of the United Kingdom.

In 1953, construction of the new facility was completed, and the company relocated there, marking the beginning of its independent history.

During this period, several blends that are still produced today were created, including Prazdnichny, Akhtamar, Nairi, and Ani.

ARARAT Yerevan was named in honor of Armenia's capital.

=== Post-Soviet period and modern history ===
After Armenia regained independence in 1991, the industry underwent restructuring and modernization.

In 1998, the Yerevan Brandy Company became part of the international group Pernod Ricard.

In 1999, a national standard regulating the production of Armenian brandy was introduced, requiring production within Armenia using locally grown grapes.

In 2001, a "Peace Barrel" was set for aging within the heritage center of the factory, in honor of the visit of OSCE Minsk Group co-chairs.

In 2010, the ARARAT brand adopted a new logo featuring a phoenix.

In 2011, the historic ARARAT Dvin brandy was reintroduced.

The Yerevan Brandy Company is one of Armenia’s largest taxpayers. and a leading purchaser of grapes in the country

=== Recent developments ===
In the 2020s, the company expanded its portfolio to include brandy-based flavored spirits such as ARARAT with the taste of Apricot, Cherry, Coffee, and Honey.

The ARARAT Charles Aznavour Signature Blend was released in collaboration with French-Armenian singer Charles Aznavour, who was personally involved in the creation of the blend.

The ultra-premium ARARAT Erebuni series includes blends aged 30, 50, and 70 years.

== Products ==
YBC's products include:

Core range

- ARARAT 3 Stars
- ARARAT 5 Stars
- ARARAT Ani (7 years)
- ARARAT Akhtamar (10 years)
- ARARAT Vaspurakan (15 years)
- ARARAT Nairi (20 years)
- ARARAT Dvin – collection reserve

Vintage series

- ARARAT Otborny
- ARARAT Armenia
- ARARAT Yerevan

Contemporary limited and flavored range

- ARARAT with the taste of Apricot
- ARARAT with the taste of Cherry
- ARARAT with the taste of Coffee
- ARARAT with the taste of Honey
- ARARAT Bourbon Cask

== ARARAT Museum ==
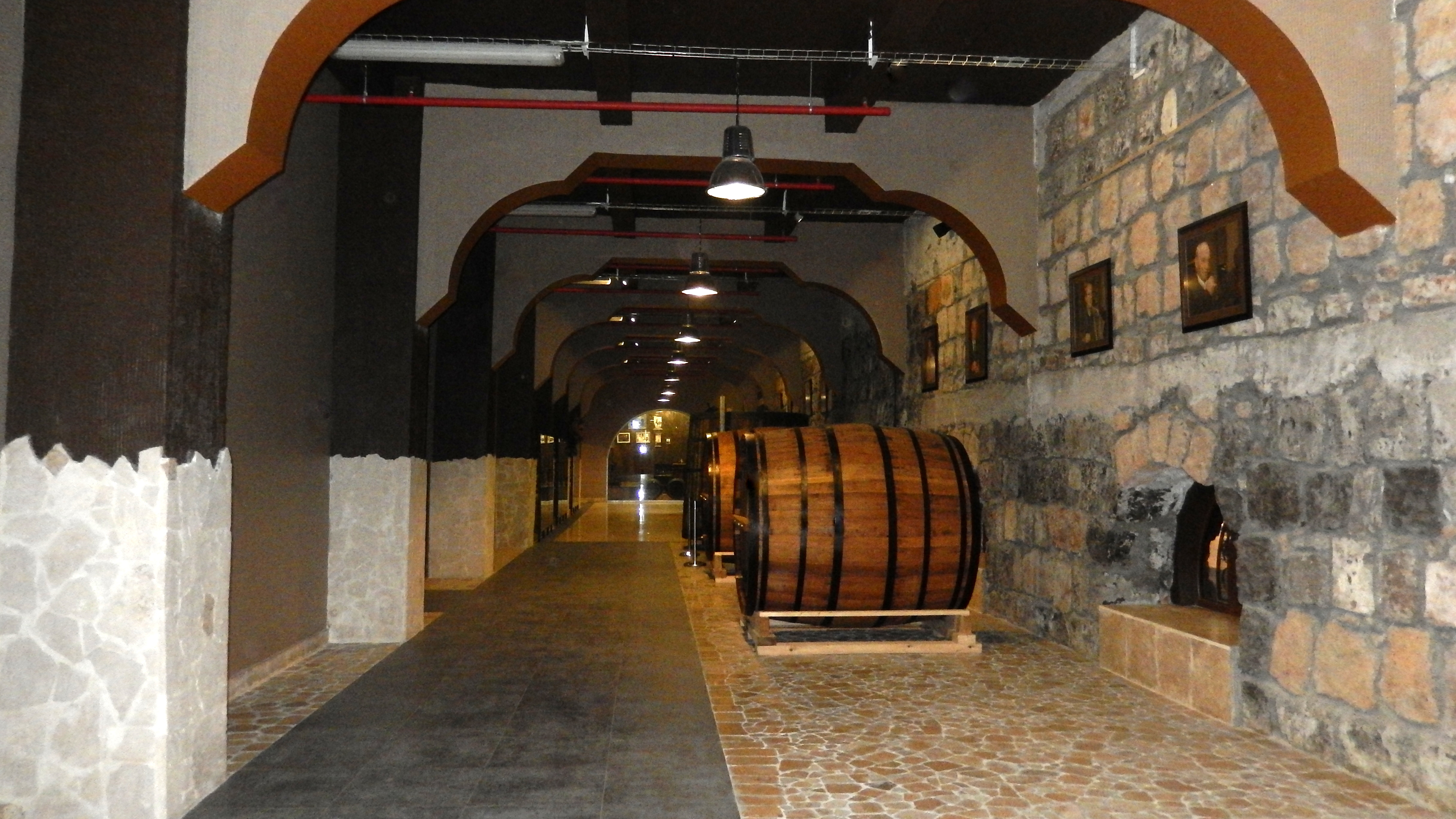
Yerevan Brandy Company Museum

The ARARAT Museum is located on the premises of the Yerevan Brandy Company and presents the history of Armenian brandy production and the ARARAT brand.

The museum includes archival materials, historical equipment, collectible bottles, and interactive exhibits. Tours pass through an active aging cellar and typically conclude with a tasting.

The museum is a member of the International Council of Museums (ICOM).

Over the years, the museum has hosted numerous figures from culture and the arts, including Charles Aznavour, George Clooney, Kevin Spacey, John Malkovich, Krzysztof Penderecki, Takeshi Kitano, Vladimir Spivakov, and Valery Gergiev, among others.

== Awards and export ==
- Exported to 52 countries
- More than 115 gold, 48 silver, and 8 bronze medals

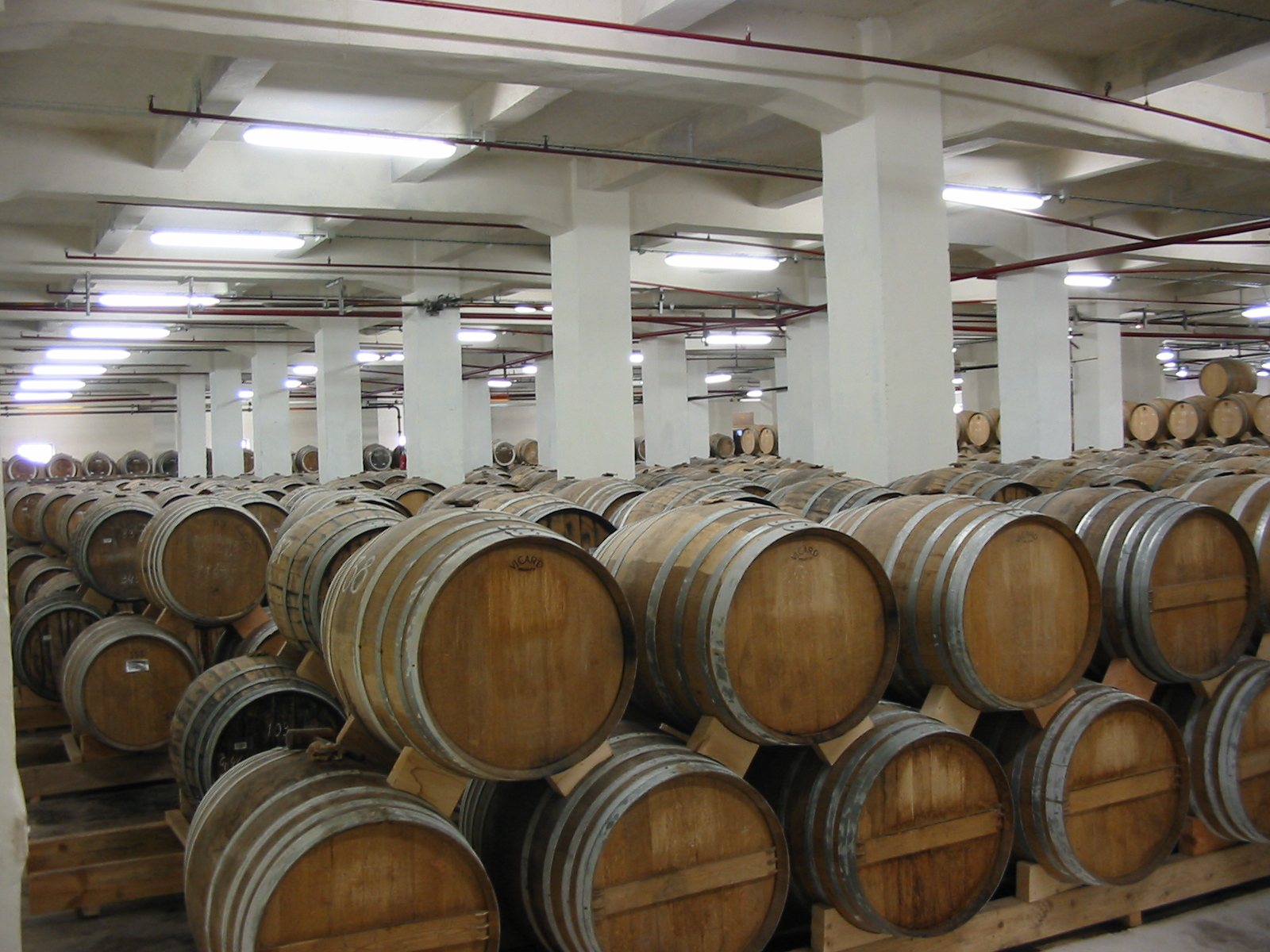
One of factory's oak barrel depositories

== See also ==
- Ararat (brandy)
- Armenian wine
- Yerevan Ararat Brandy Factory
- Yerevan Champagne Wines Factory
