= Margaryan =

Margaryan or Markaryan (Armenian: Մարգարյան) or its Western Armenian variant Markarian is a common Armenian family name. Notable people with the surname include:

- Alen Margaryan (1999–2020), Armenian serviceman
- Alen Markaryan (born 1966), Turkish business entrepreneur, writer, sports columnist and activist
- Amalia Margaryan (born 1995), Armenian singer/songwriter
- Andranik Margaryan (1951–2007), Prime Minister of Armenia (2000–2007)
- Aram Margaryan (born 1974), Armenian freestyle wrestler
- Armen Margaryan (born 1971), Armenian actor
- Dmitri Margaryan (born 1978), Armenian swimmer
- Gurgen Margaryan (1978–2004), lieutenant in the Armenian army murdered in Budapest, Hungary
- Hayk Margaryan (born 1985), better known by stage name HT Hayko, Armenian rapper
- Hrachya Margaryan (born 1999), Armenian wrestler
- Hripsime Margaryan (born 1975), Armenian artist
- Karen Margaryan (born 2001), Armenian weightlifter
- Narek Margaryan (born 1983), Armenian comedian, screenwriter and television host
- Robert Markaryan (born 1949), Russian diplomat
- Sirusho Markaryan (born 1987), Armenian singer
- Smbat Margaryan (born 1993), Armenian weightlifter
- Syuzan Margaryan (born 1961), Armenian singer
- Taron Margaryan (born 1978), mayor of Yerevan, Armenia
- Valmar (Volodya Margaryan) (born 1948), Armenian painter
- Vladimir Margaryan (born 1991), Armenian boxer
- Yervand Margaryan (born 1961), Armenian historian and doctor
- Zhirayr Margaryan (born 1997), Armenian footballer

== See also ==
- Markarian (disambiguation), variant in Western Armenian
