= Eurnekian =

Eurnekian is a surname. Notable people with the surname include:

- Eduardo Eurnekian (born 1932), Argentine billionaire businessman of Armenian descent
  - Eurnekian School, school in Armenia financed by Eduardo
