= Multi Group Stone =

Armenian mining and processing company

- Company type: Privately-held company
- Industry: Mining
- Founded: 2002; 23 years ago in Abovyan, Armenia
- Founder: Multi Group Concern
- Headquarters: Armenia
- Key people: Gagik Tsarukyan (Multi Group Concern owner)
- Parent: Multi Group Concern
- Website: www.stone.am

Multi Group Stone CJSC was established by "Multi Group Concern" in 2002 in Abovyan city, Armenia. The company is involved in minerals mining and processing, i.e. the mining of blocks of natural stone, travertine, at the own quarry (Ararat city) and the whole cycle of manufacture and final processing of tiles at the factory (Abovyan city).

The plant occupies a territory of about 25,000 m^{2} (270,000 sq.ft.). The industrial building is about 4,100 m^{2} (44,000 sq.ft.).

The main types of travertine products are "Ararat Classico" and "Ararat Noce". Since 2004 the company exports its products to several western countries including United States, Canada, Germany and Russia.

Products include polished, honed, brushed and tumbled stones.

"Multi Group Concern" is owned by the Armenian businessman and member of the National Assembly Gagik Tsarukyan.
