= Valmar (painter) =

Armenian painter

Valmar Վալմար
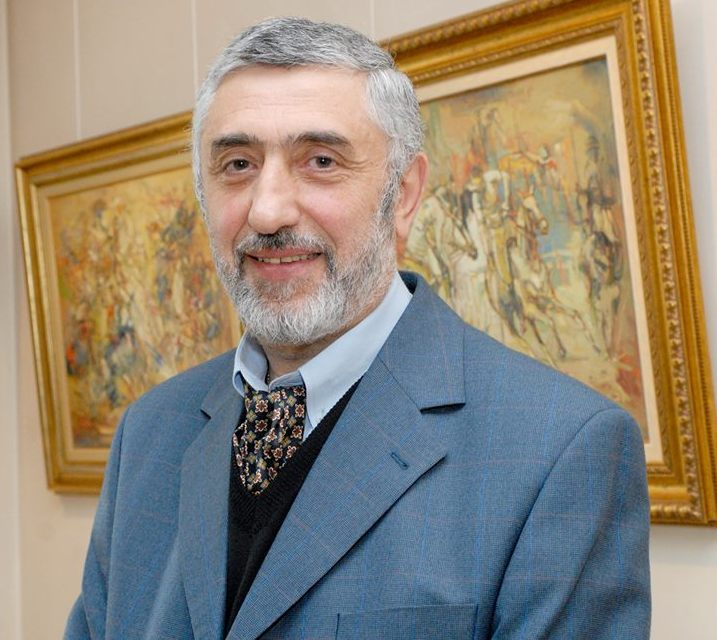
- Born: Volodya Margaryan; April 21, 1948 (age 78); Gyumri
- Known for: Painter
- Awards: 2006 Honored Artist of Armenia. 2007 Golden medal after “Catholicos of all Armenians, Vazgen 1-st”. 2008 Golden medal of the “Ministry of Culture”. 2011 Prime-minister medal. 2011 “Master” honourable gold medal. 2013 RA Culture Ministry “ Grigor Narekatsy” medal.

Volodya Margaryan (Armenian: Վոլոդյա Մարգարյան) known as Valmar (Armenian: Վալմար; born 21 April 1948), is an Armenian painter. People's artist of Armenia (2015).

== Biography ==
Volodya Margaryan was born in 1948 in Gyumri. 1966 he studied at Merkurov School of Fine Arts, Gyumri. 1972 he graduated from Yerevan Fine Arts Institute, he was a student of Armenian Painter and sculptor Yervand Kochar. Since 1972 Valmar participated in many exhibitions organized in the Armenian Republic and abroad. In 1976 he became member of the Artist Union of the USSR, since 1994 member of international union of artists (UNESCO). 1976-1980 he has been the director of Akhourian Fine Arts School and Secretary of the Armenian Artists Union of Gyumri. In 1980 he became head of the art department at Yerevan Art School #1. In 2004 Valmar founded "Valmar Art Gallery" in Yerevan.

Valmar is an author of many art and design books.

Valmar's works are kept in National Gallery of Armenia, Museum of Modern Art, Art Museum of Vanadzor, Echmiadzin, Jermuk and Gyumri, Museum of Friendship of Russia and Armenian Peoples (Abovyan), Ministry of Culture of Armenia (Archives of Fine Arts), The Tretiakov State Art Gallery, The Museum of Eastern Peoples, Ministry of Foreign Affairs, Archives of the Ministry of Culture of Russia, in Hammer Collection, Alex Manoukian Museum (Detroit), Kew Gallery New York, The “Stamp” company, Italy, “Eadou ko LTD” company, Japan, Galerie Basmajian, France.

== Exhibitions ==
- 2013 Valmar art gallery, “Spanish Impression” Yerevan, Armenia
- 2012 Valmar art gallery, “Graphic Works” Yerevan, Armenia
- 2011 Valmar art gallery, “Venetian Impression” Yerevan, Armenia
- 2010 Valmar art gallery, Yerevan, Armenia
- 2009 Valmar art gallery, Yerevan, Armenia
- 2008 National Gallery of Armenia, Yerevan, Armenia
- 2007 “Stephani’s Art Gallery” La Canada, CA, United States
- 2006 Cultural Center of the City of Nant, France
- 2005 Valmar art Gallery, Yerevan, Armenia
- 2004 The first international Visual Art EXPO “Art Caucasus” Tbilisi, Georgia
- 2004 “International Club Berlin” Armenian Embassy, Germany
- 2003 Gallery Evan, New York, USA (Group Show)
- 2002 Cultural Center of the City of Athens
- 2002 Maison de la Artisanat, Marseille, France
- 2001 Green Art Gallery, Dubai, UAE
- 2000 Kew Gallery, New York City, USA (Group Show)
- 2000 International Art Festival, Kyiv, Ukraine
- 2000 Al Fayrouz Gallery, Manama, Bahrain
- 1999 Cite Internationale des Arts Paris, France
- 1998 Hovnanian School, New Jersey, USA
- 1998 National Gallery of Armenia, Yerevan, Armenia
- 1998 Armenian Embassy, Los Angeles, Washington, New York, USA
- 1997 Armenian Embassy, Montreal, Toronto, Ottawa, Canada
- 1997 Union Armenienne de Suisse, Geneva, Porrentruy, Switzerland
- 1996 Hilton Hotel, New York, USA
- 1996 Armenian Prelacy, New York, USA
- 1996 Galerie Etienne de Causans, Paris, France
- 1995 Hamazkayin, Aleppo, Syria
- 1995 Gallery Chaura, Damascus, Syria
- 1994 Maison Armenienne, Marseilles, France
- 1994 Galerie Les Cent, Paris, France
- 1994 Gallery Chaura, Damascus, Syria
- 1993 Armenian Prelacy, Beirut, Lebanon
- 1992 Union of Armenian Artists, Yerevan, Armenia
- 1992 Hamazkayin, San Francisco, USA
- 1991 Anahit Association, London, England
- 1990 Palace of Culture, Budapest, Hungary
- 1989 A.G.B.U. Art Gallery, Los Angeles, USA
- 1988 A.G.B.U. Art Gallery, Detroit, Los Angeles, USA
- 1987 Galerie Basmajian, Paris, France
- 1986 Zintari Creative House, Latvia
- 1986 Art Workers House, Moscow, Russia
- 1985 Journalists House, Yerevan, Armenia
- 1980 Tartu Artists House, Estonia
- 1977 Museum of Modern Arts, Yerevan, Armenia

== Family ==
Valmar's daughter Hripsime Margaryan is the head of "Valmar Art Gallery", Yerevan. She is an artist and designer.

== See also ==
- List of Armenian artists
- List of Armenians
- Culture of Armenia

== Gallery ==
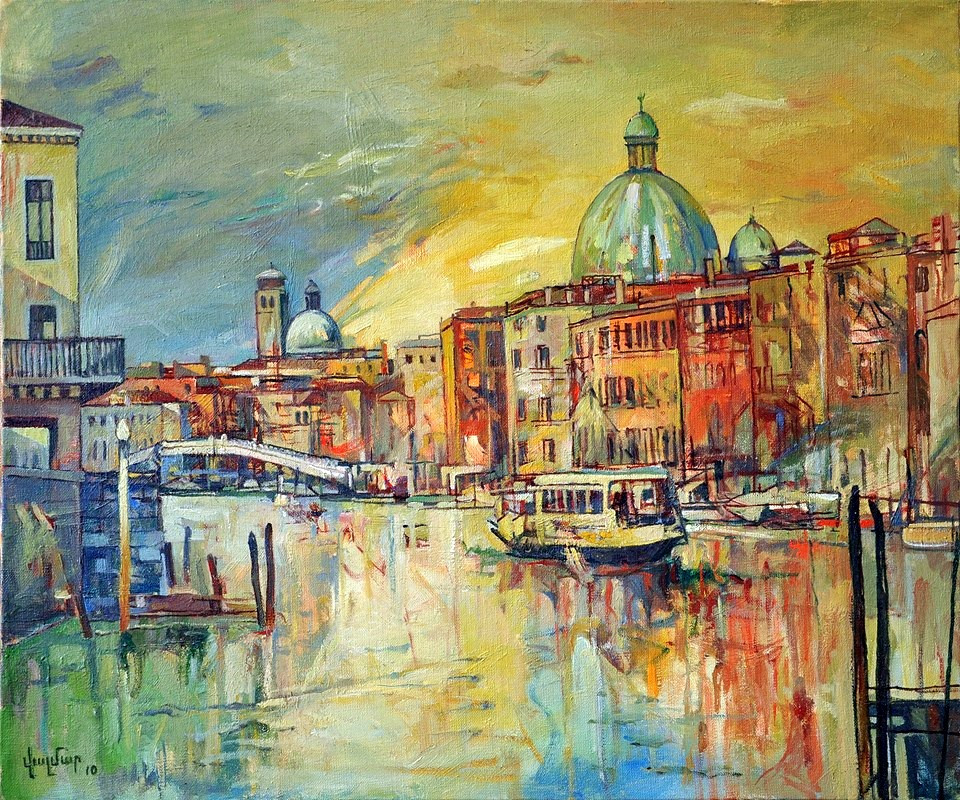

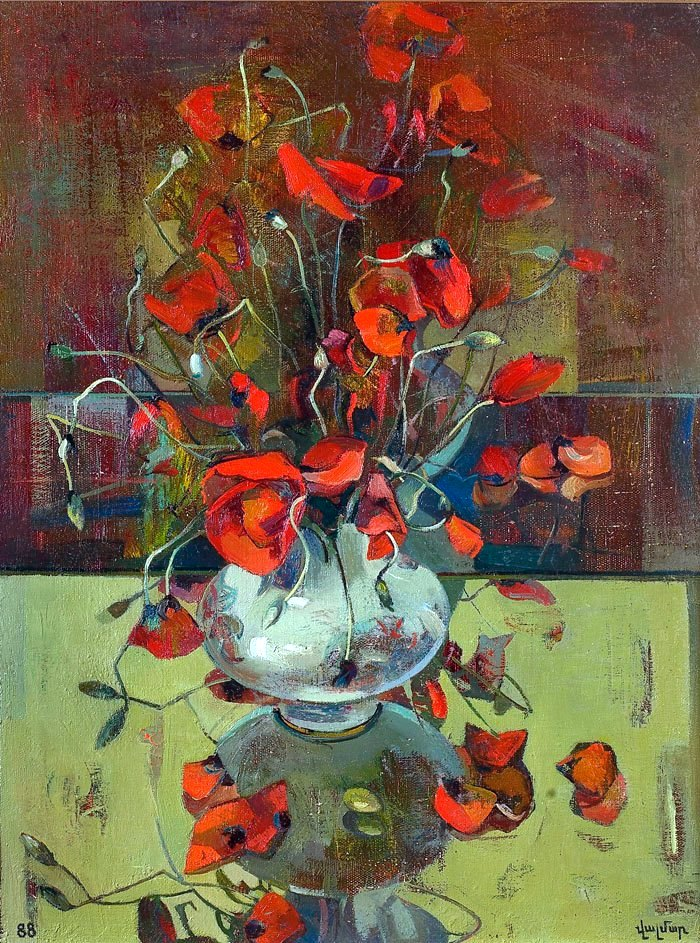

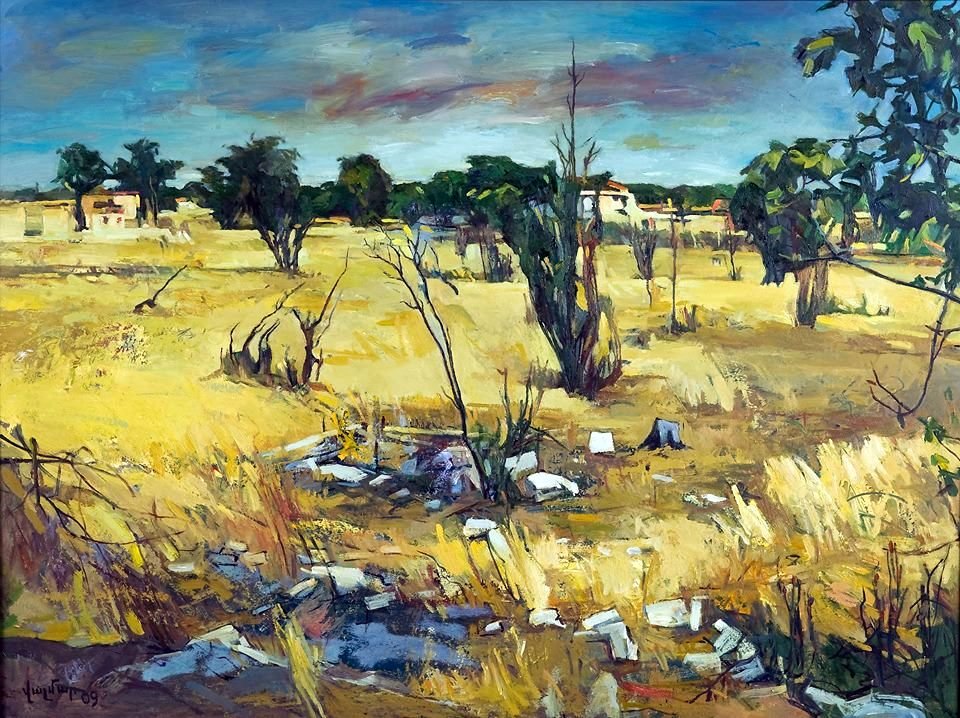

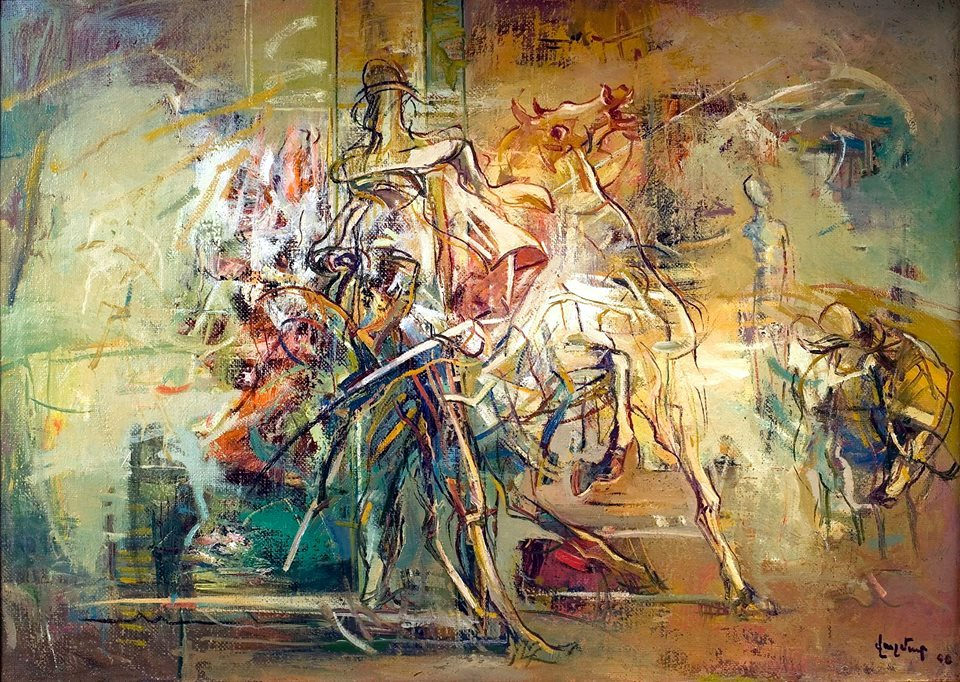
