= Artak Ghulyan =

Armenian architect (1958–2025)

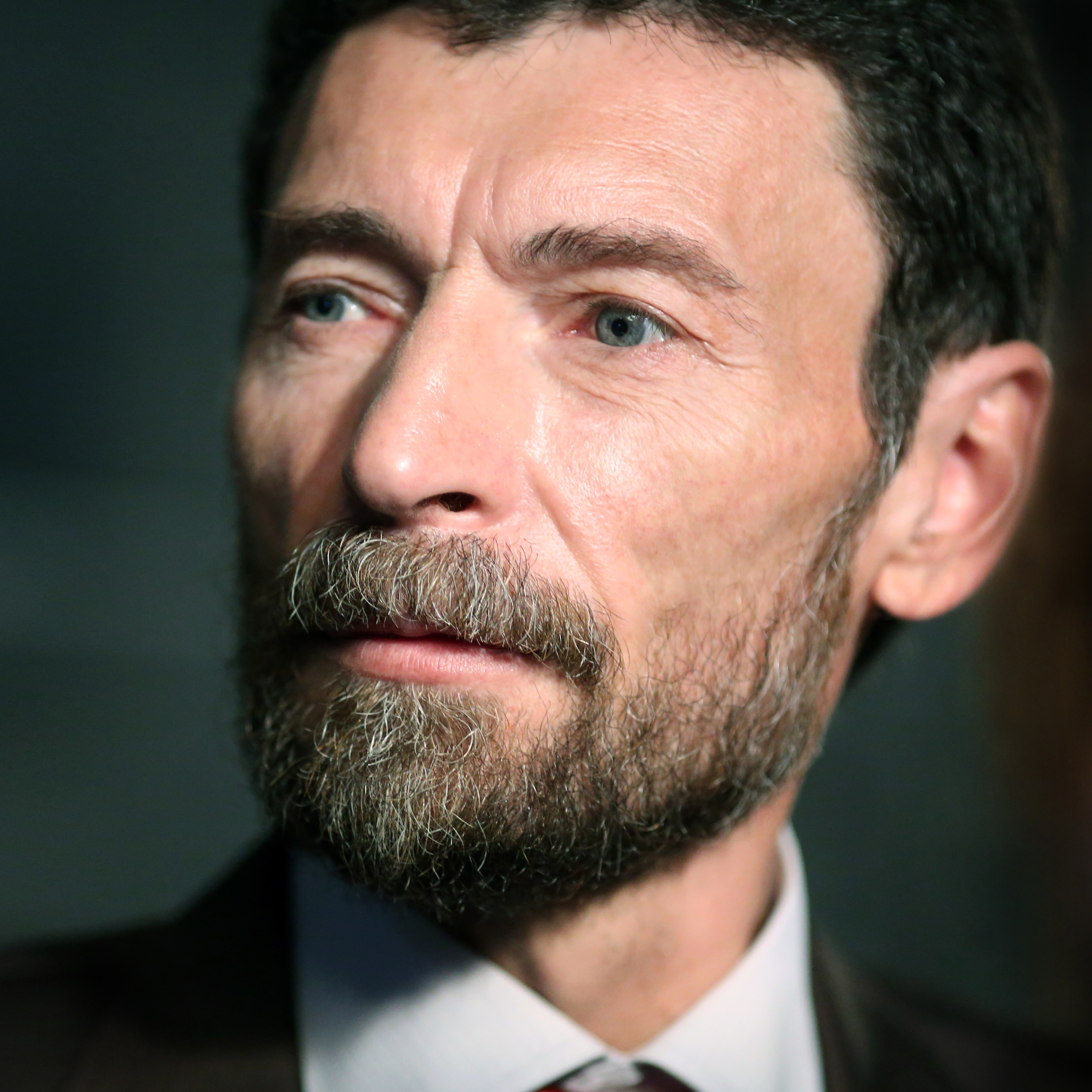
- Artak Ghulyan
- Born: 28 December 1958; Gyulistan, Azerbaijan SSR, USSR
- Died: 16 April 2025 (aged 66)
- Education: National University of Architecture and Construction of Armenia
- Occupation: Architect
- Awards: "Honored Architect of the Republic of Armenia" "State Prize of the Republic of Armenia" (2013)
- Practice: Ghulyan Architects
- Buildings: Saint John the Baptist Church, Holy Transfiguration Cathedral, Vatche and Tamar Manoukian Manuscript Library
- Website: www.ghulyanarchitects.com

Artak Ghulyan (Armenian: Արտակ Ղուլյան; 28 December 1958 – 16 April 2025) was an Armenian architect and designer, and professor of the International Academy of Architecture. In September 2013, he received the title of "Honored Architect of the Republic of Armenia". In December 2013, he received the "State Prize of the Republic of Armenia" for the design of the Vatche and Tamar Manoukian Manuscript Library building at the Mother See of Holy Etchmiadzin.

Ghulyan designed many civil buildings and monuments, but his fame was mainly based on his evolutionary designs of new Armenian churches.

== Early life and career ==
Artak Ghulyan was born in 1958 in Gyulistan village of the Shahumyan Region, a majority-Armenian administrative unit outside the Nagorno-Karabakh Autonomous Oblast, within the Azerbaijan Soviet Socialist Republic, USSR. His parents were teachers at the school of the village.

After completing his secondary education in his native village with honorary degrees in 1976, Ghulyan moved to Yerevan to study architecture at the National University of Architecture and Construction of Armenia, known as the Karl Marx Institute of Polytechnic during the Soviet period. He graduated from the university in 1981.

Between 1981 and 1988 Ghulyan worked as an assistant lecturer in the Faculty of Architecture of the Polytechnic Institute, teaching the basics of architectural design. Between 1988 and 1991 he was employed by the Art Institute of the Armenian National Academy of Sciences to work at the Department of Architecture. Between 1991 and 1994, Ghulyan worked as the chief of the Department of Medieval Monuments of the Board of Monuments Preservation of the Republic of Armenia. In 1994, he became a senior co-worker of the National Academy's art institute. Between 1988 and 2010, Ghulyan concurrently worked as a teacher in the Faculty of Architecture of the National University of Architecture and Construction of Armenia lecturing on architectural theory and the restoration of historic monuments. In 2002, Ghulyan became a Docent (Associate professor), and later in 2006 he received his PhD degree in architecture from the University of Architecture and Construction of Armenia.

== Personal life and death ==
Ghulyan was married to Hasmik Stepanyan, a graduate of the Yerevan Brusov State University of Languages and Social Sciences. The couple had two children. He died on 16 April 2025, at the age of 66.

== National awards ==
In September 2013, Ghulyan received the title of "Honored Architect of the Republic of Armenia" by a decree issued by then-president Serzh Sargsyan. In December of the same year, president Serzh Sargsyan honored him with the "State Prize of the Republic of Armenia" in the field of urban development and architecture, for the design of the Vatche and Tamar Manoukian Manuscript Library building in Etchmiadzin.

== Works and designs ==
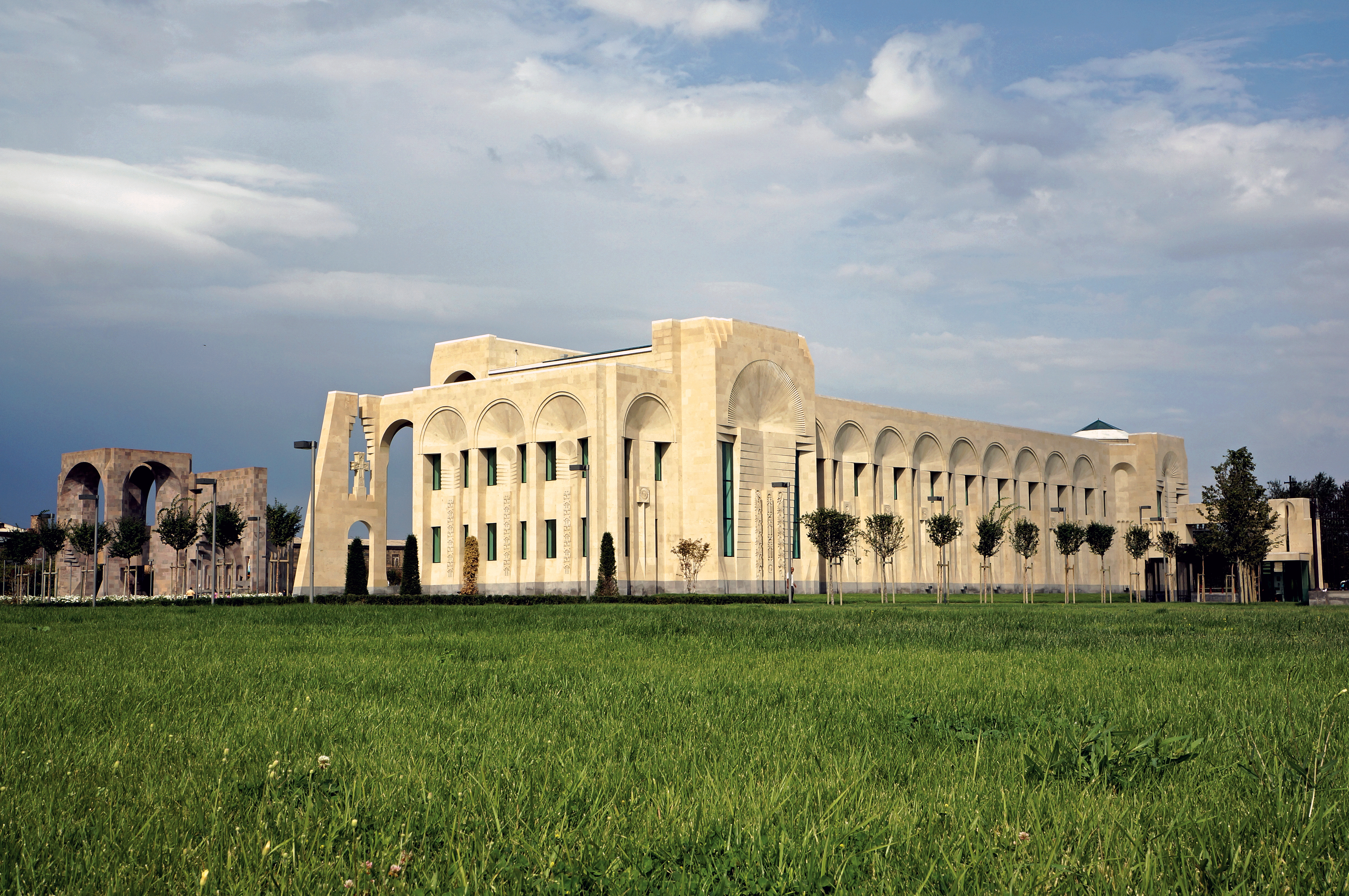
Manoukian Manuscript Library

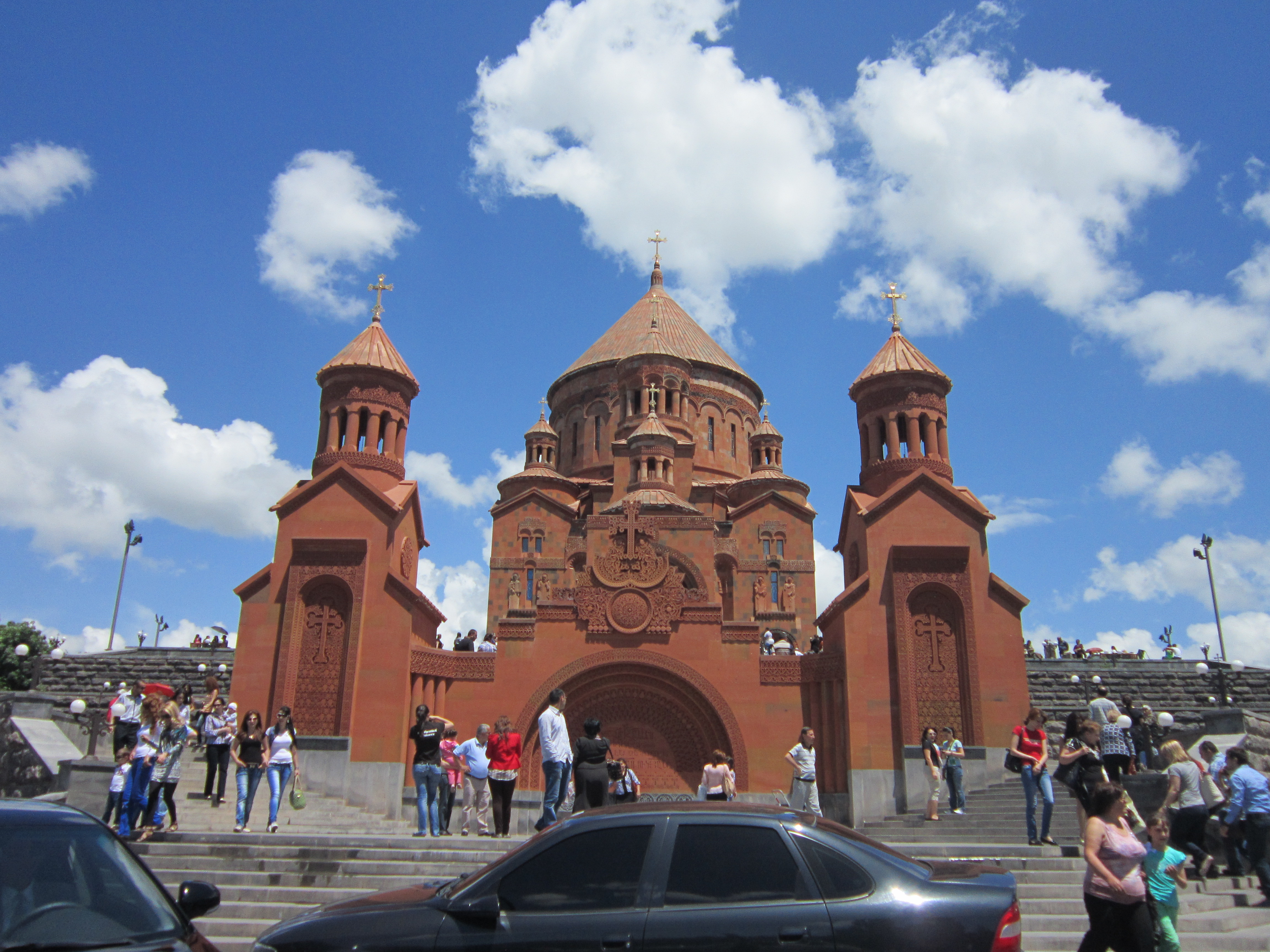
Saint John the Baptist Church of Abovyan

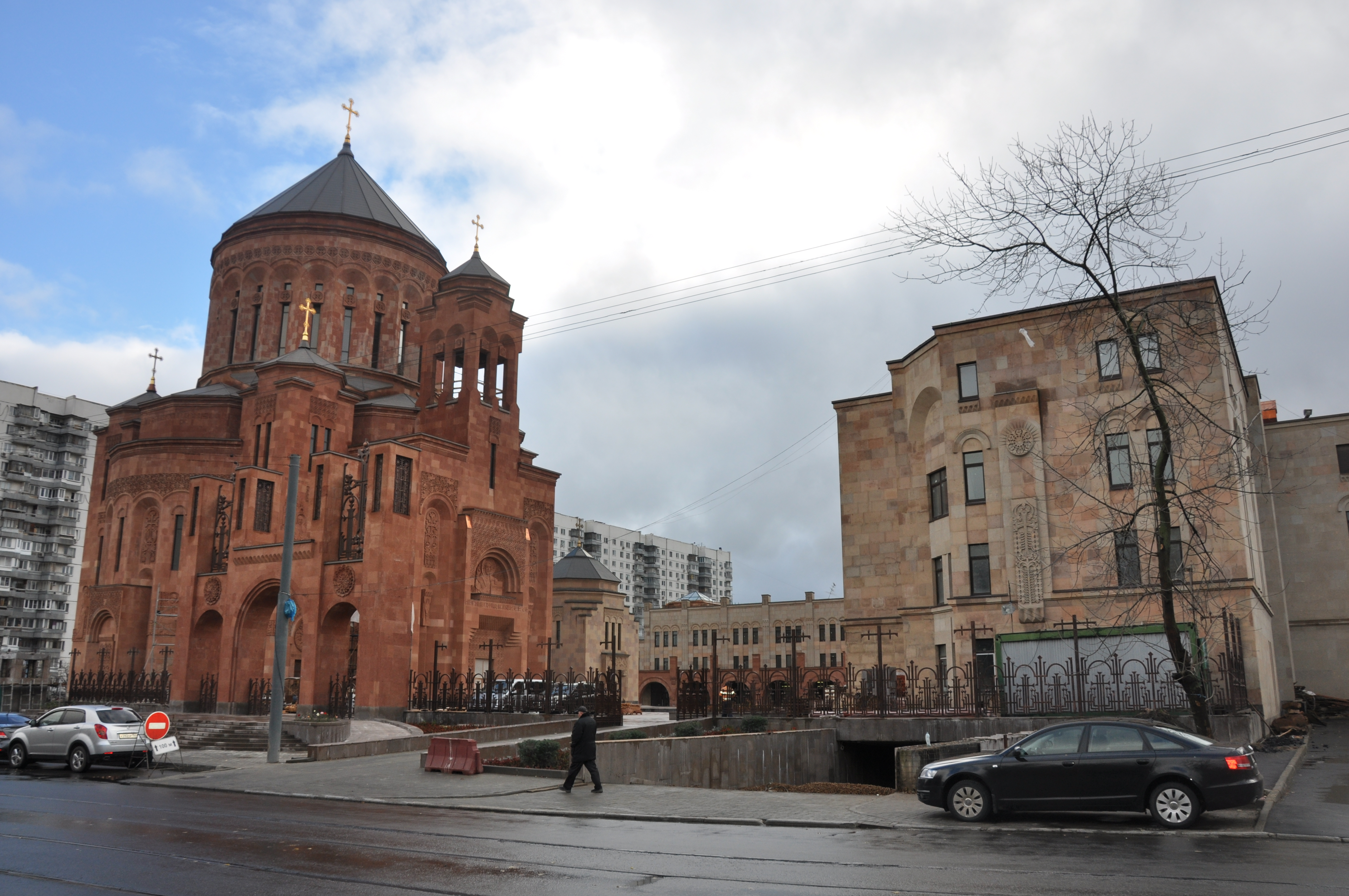
Armenian Monastery Complex of Moscow

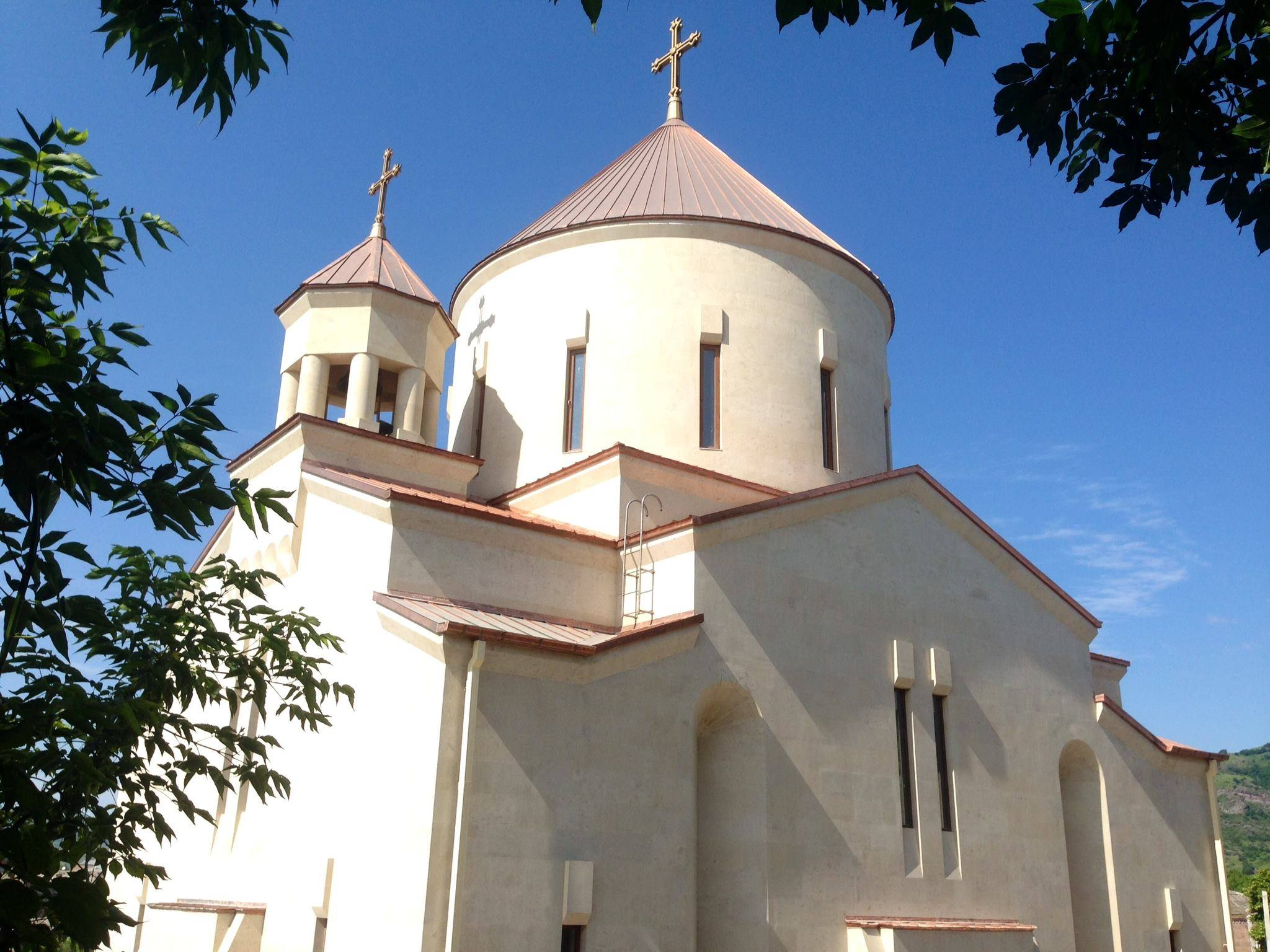
Surp Hovhannes Church, Berd

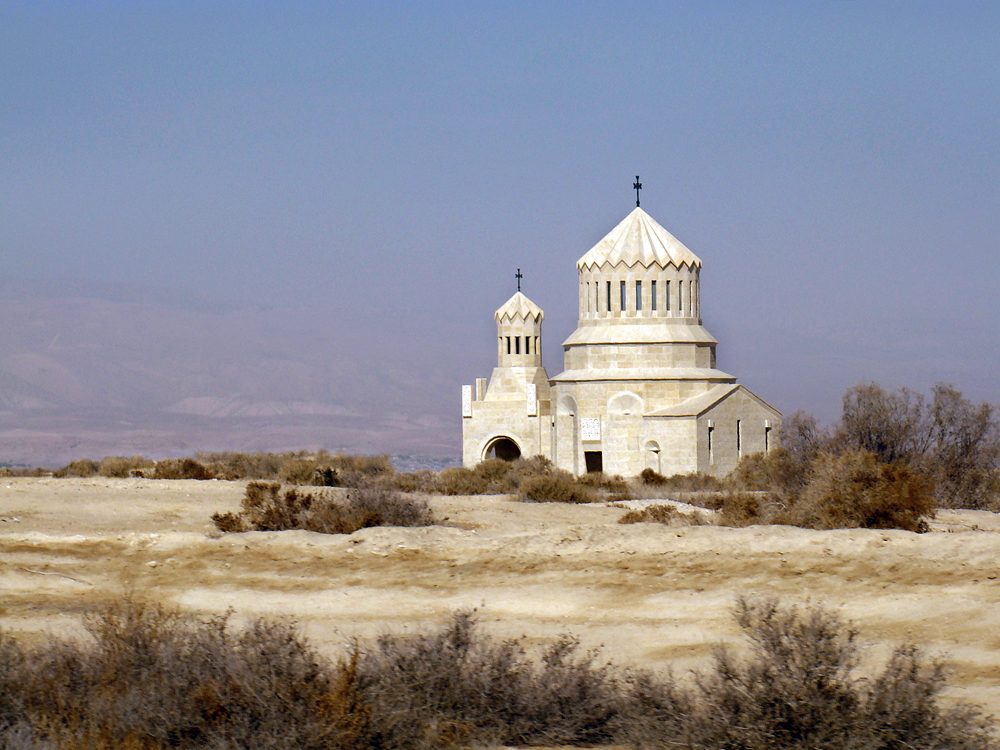
Surp Karapet Church, near Jordan River, Jordan

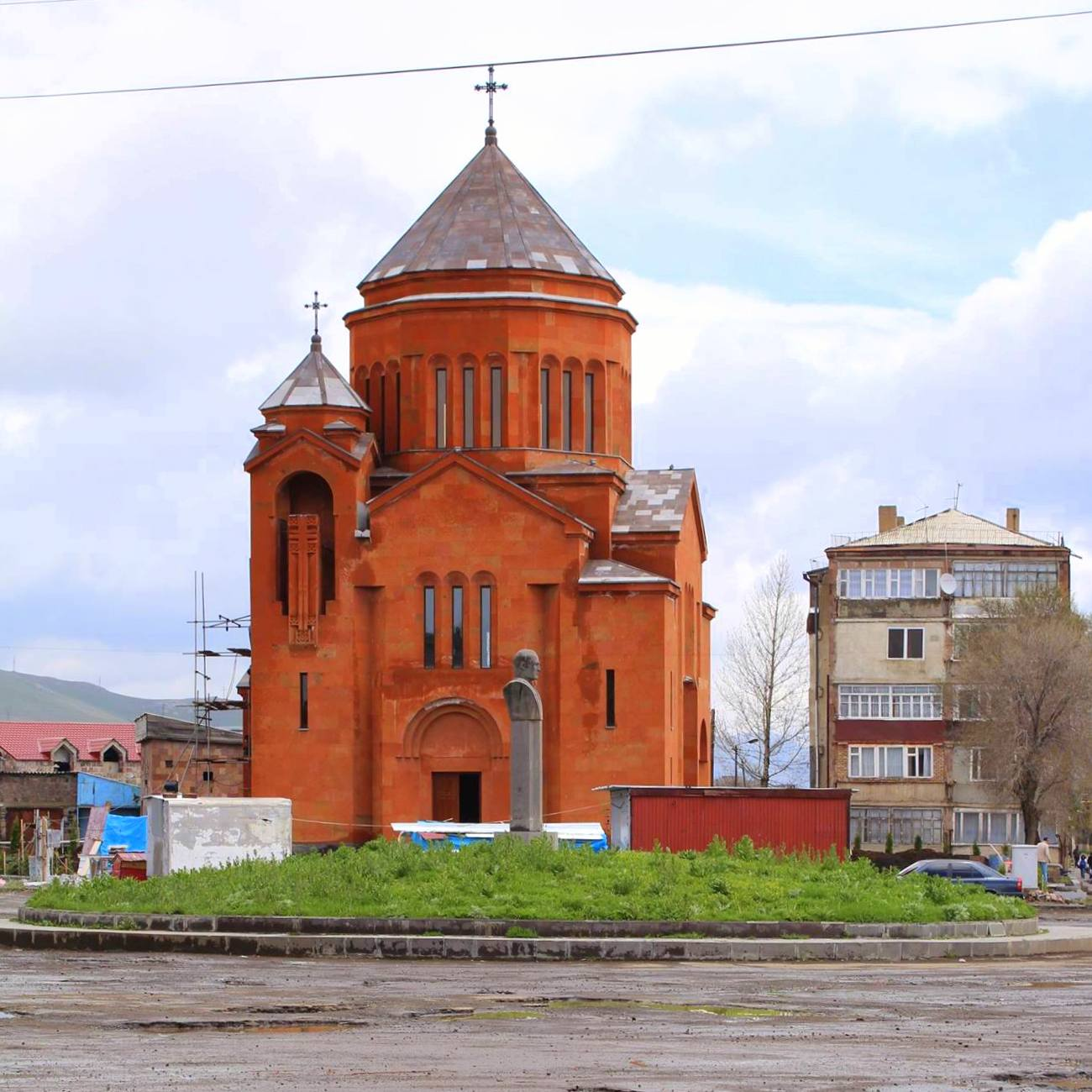
Church of the Holy Archangels, Sevan

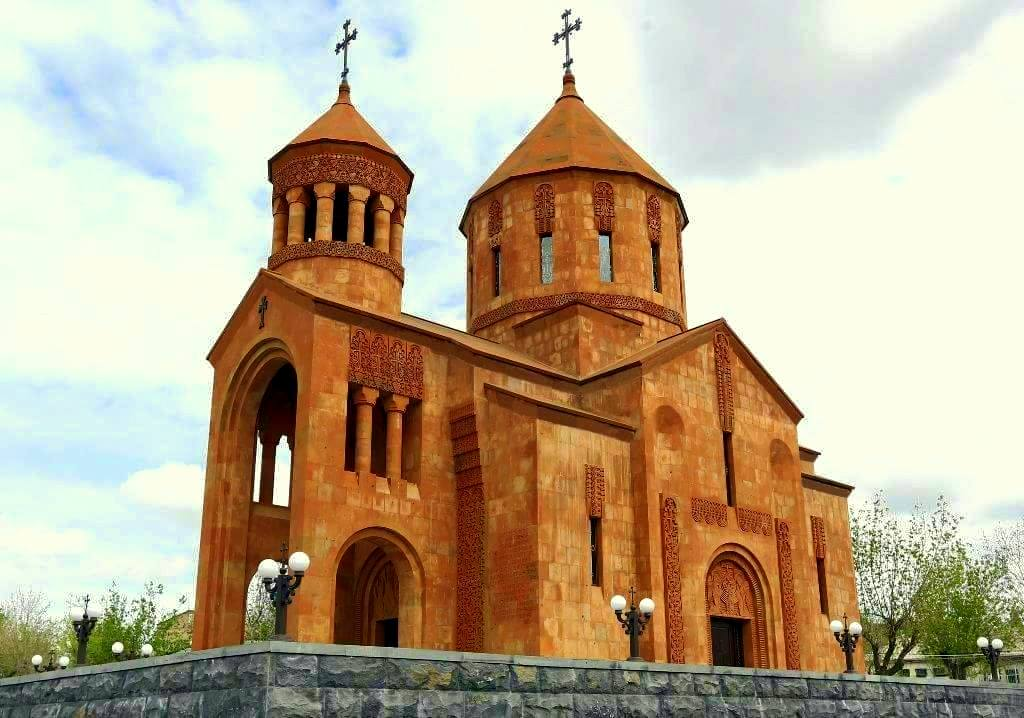
Church of the Holy Martyrs, Nubarashen, Yerevan

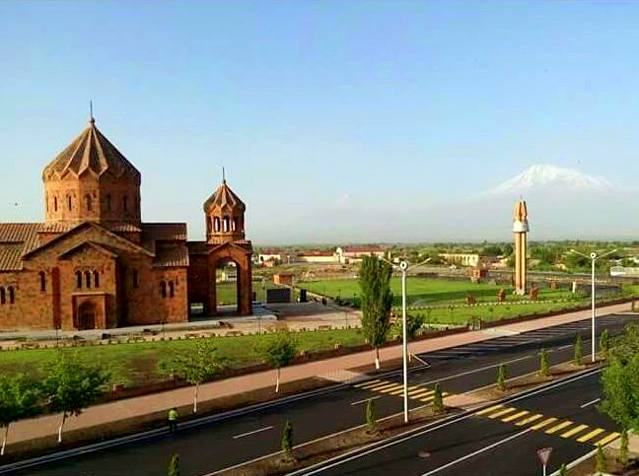
Surp Hovhannes Church, Artashat

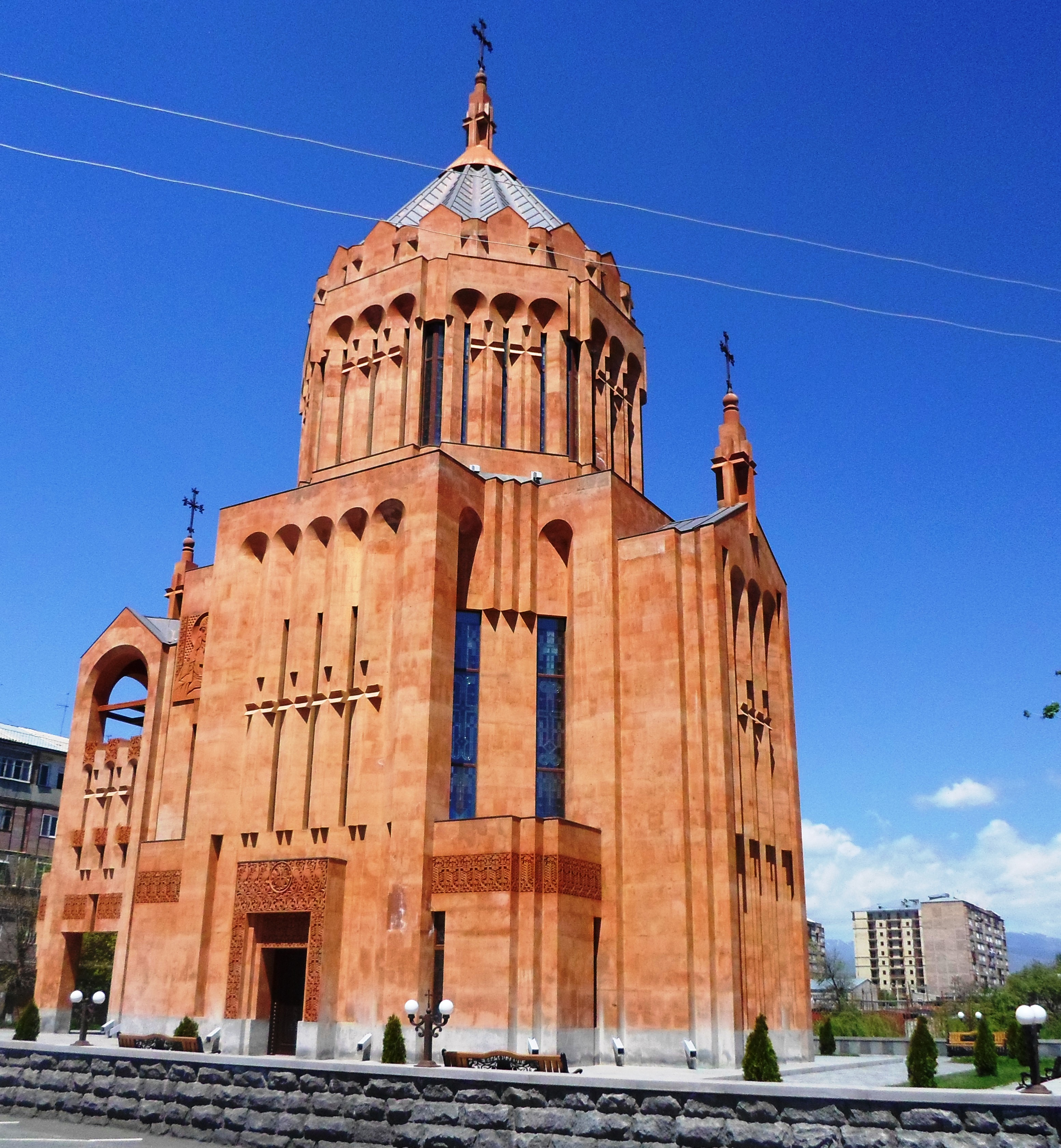
Church of the Holy Saviour, Nor Hachn

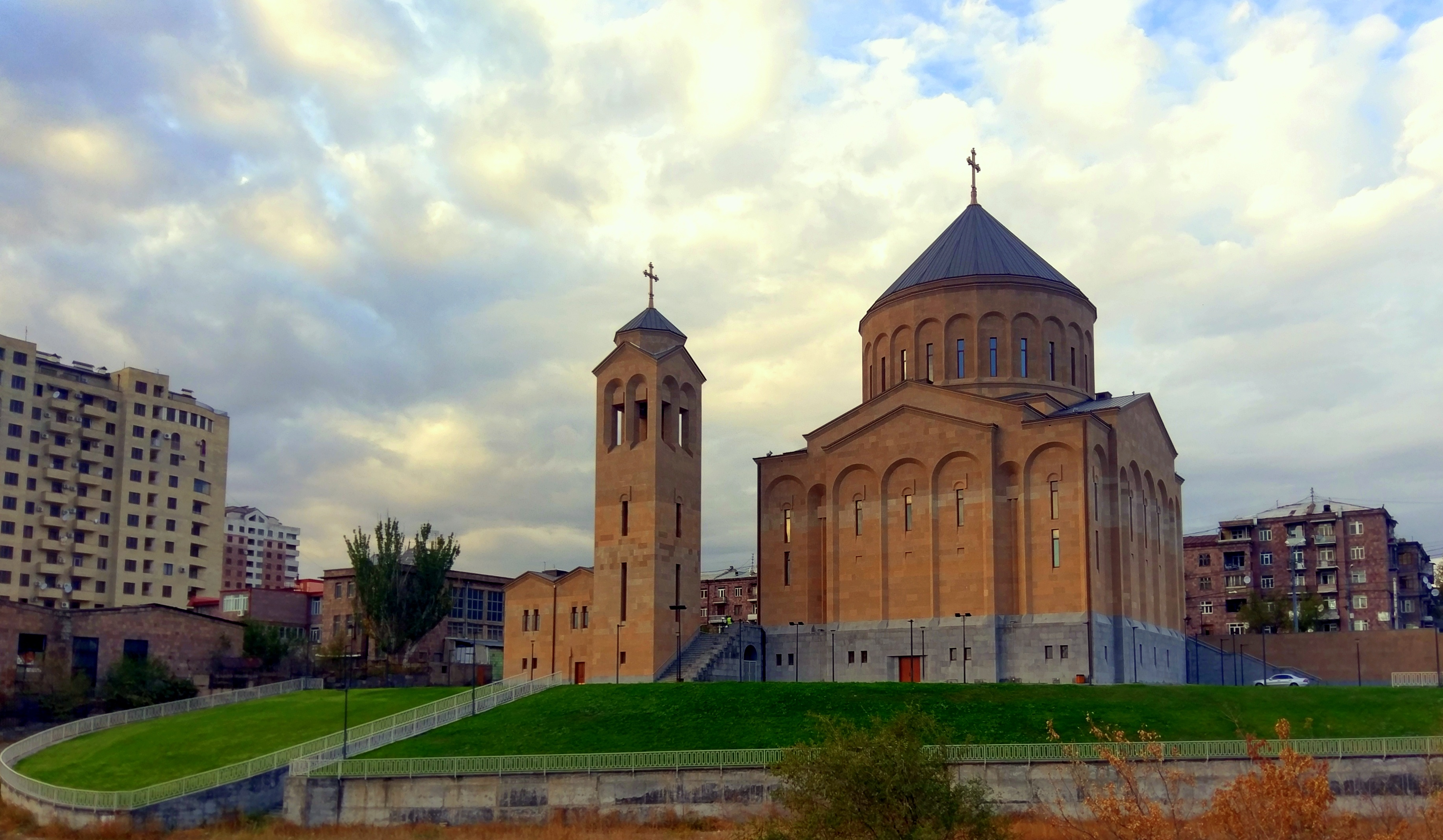
Holy Cross Church, Arabkir, Yerevan

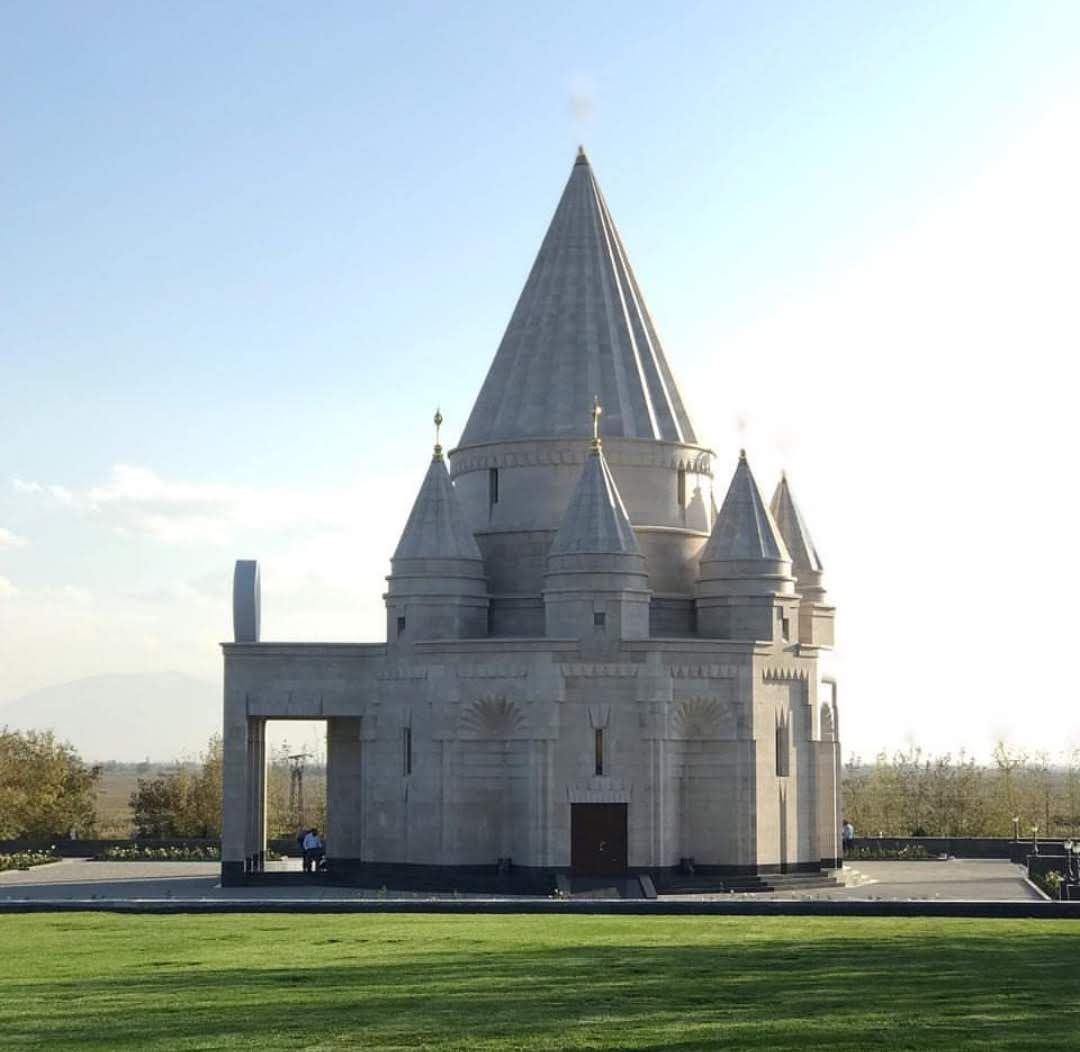
Quba Mere Diwane Yazidi Temple, Aknalich

Artak Ghulyan designed many Armenian churches throughout Armenia as well as the Armenian diaspora. His notable works include:

- Vatche and Tamar Manoukian Manuscript Library of the Mother See of Holy Etchmiadzin, Vagharshapat, opened in October 2012.
- Saint John the Baptist Church, Abovyan, opened in May 2013.
- Armenian Monastery Complex of Moscow: Holy Transfiguration Cathedral and the Church of the Holy Cross, opened in September 2013.
- Surp Hovhannes Church, Berd, opened in September 2014.
- Surp Karapet Church, near Jordan River, Jordan, opened in October 2014.
- Church of the Holy Archangels, Sevan, opened in March 2015.
- Church of the Holy Martyrs in Nubarashen, Yerevan, opened in April 2015.
- Surp Hovhannes Church, Artashat, opened in May 2015.
- Church of the Holy Saviour, Nor Hachn, opened in July 2015.
- Eurnekian School of the Mother See of Holy Etchmiadzin, Vagharshapat, opened in September 2017.
- Holy Cross Church of Arabkir District, Yerevan, opened in April 2018.
- Quba Mere Diwane Yazidi Temple, Aknalich, opened in September 2019

=== Projected works ===
- Mesrop Mashtots Church in Erebuni, Yerevan, construction in progress.
- Armenian church complex, Cherepovets, construction in progress.
- Armenian church, Surgut, construction in progress.
- Church of the Holy Martyrs in Shengavit, Yerevan, awarded.
