= Markarian =

Markarian (Armentian: Մարգարյան) or its Eastern Armenian variant Margaryan, is a common Armenian family name.

Markarian may refer to:

== Persons ==
- Beniamin Markarian (1913–1985), Armenian astrophysicist
- George Markarian, Iranian football player
- Hal Markarian, Armenian-American aircraft designer
- Henri Markarian (1926–1985), better known as Marc Aryan, Armenian-Belgian singer
- Hrant Markarian (born 1958), Armenian politician and head of the ARF
- Maro Markarian (1915–1999), Armenian poet and translator
- Roberto Markarian (born 1946), Uruguayan-Armenian mathematician, Rector of the University of the Republic 2014-2018
- Ronald Markarian (1931–2019), United States Air Force Major General
- Sergio Markarián (born 1944), Uruguayan-Armenian football coach and coach of national football team of Greece
- Tatoul Markarian (born 1964), Armenian Ambassador

== Space ==
- Markarian's Chain, a stretch of galaxies that forms part of the Virgo Cluster
- Markarian galaxies, including a list of galaxies that include the name Markarian

== See also ==
- Margaryan (disambiguation), Eastern Armenian variant of Markarian
