= Saint John the Baptist Church, Abovyan =

Church building in Abovyan, Armenia

Coordinates: 40°16′33″N 44°37′53″E

Saint John the Baptist Church Սուրբ Հովհաննես Մկրտիչ Եկեղեցի
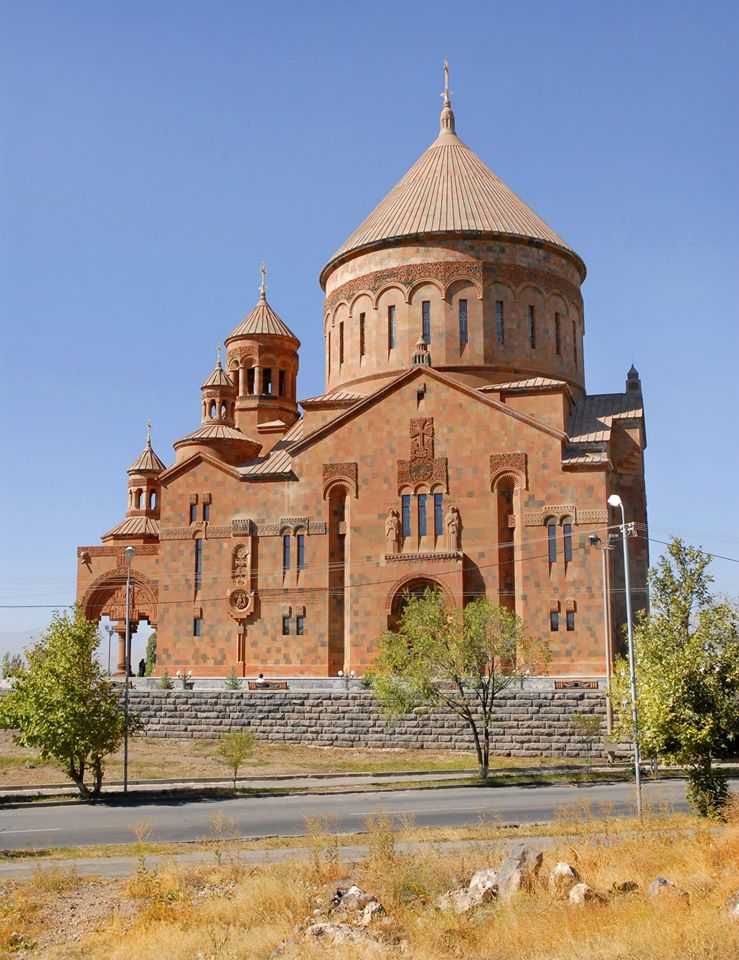
- Saint John the Baptist Church

- Location within Armenia

Religion
- Affiliation: Diocese of Kotayk, Armenian Apostolic Church
- District: Kentron district
- Region: Kotayk
- Rite: Christian Orthodox
- Ecclesiastical or organisational status: active
- Year consecrated: 2013

Location
- Location: Abovyan, Kotayk, Armenia

Architecture
- Architect: Artak Ghulyan
- Style: Armenian
- Groundbreaking: 24 August 2006
- Completed: 14 May 2013

Specifications
- Height (max): 50 meters
- Dome: 4

Saint John the Baptist Church (Armenian: Սուրբ Հովհաննես Մկրտիչ Եկեղեցի, Surp Hovhannes Mkrtich) is a monumental Armenian Apostolic church in the town of Abovyan, Kotayk Province, Armenia.

== Overview ==
The construction was launched in August 2006 and funded by the Armenian businessman Gagik Tsarukyan. After a 7-year duration of construction works, the church was finally consecrated in May 2013 by Catholicos Karekin II, with the presence of then-president of Armenia Serzh Sargsyan, president of Belarus Alexander Lukashenko and former president of Armenia Robert Kocharyan.

The main architect of the church is Artak Ghulyan, and the constructional engineers are Hovhannes Meyroyan and Tigran Dadayan. The internal paintings are the works of Abraham Azaryan and Hayk Azaryan. However, the creative team of the church grouped around 40 painters and sculptors.

== Gallery ==
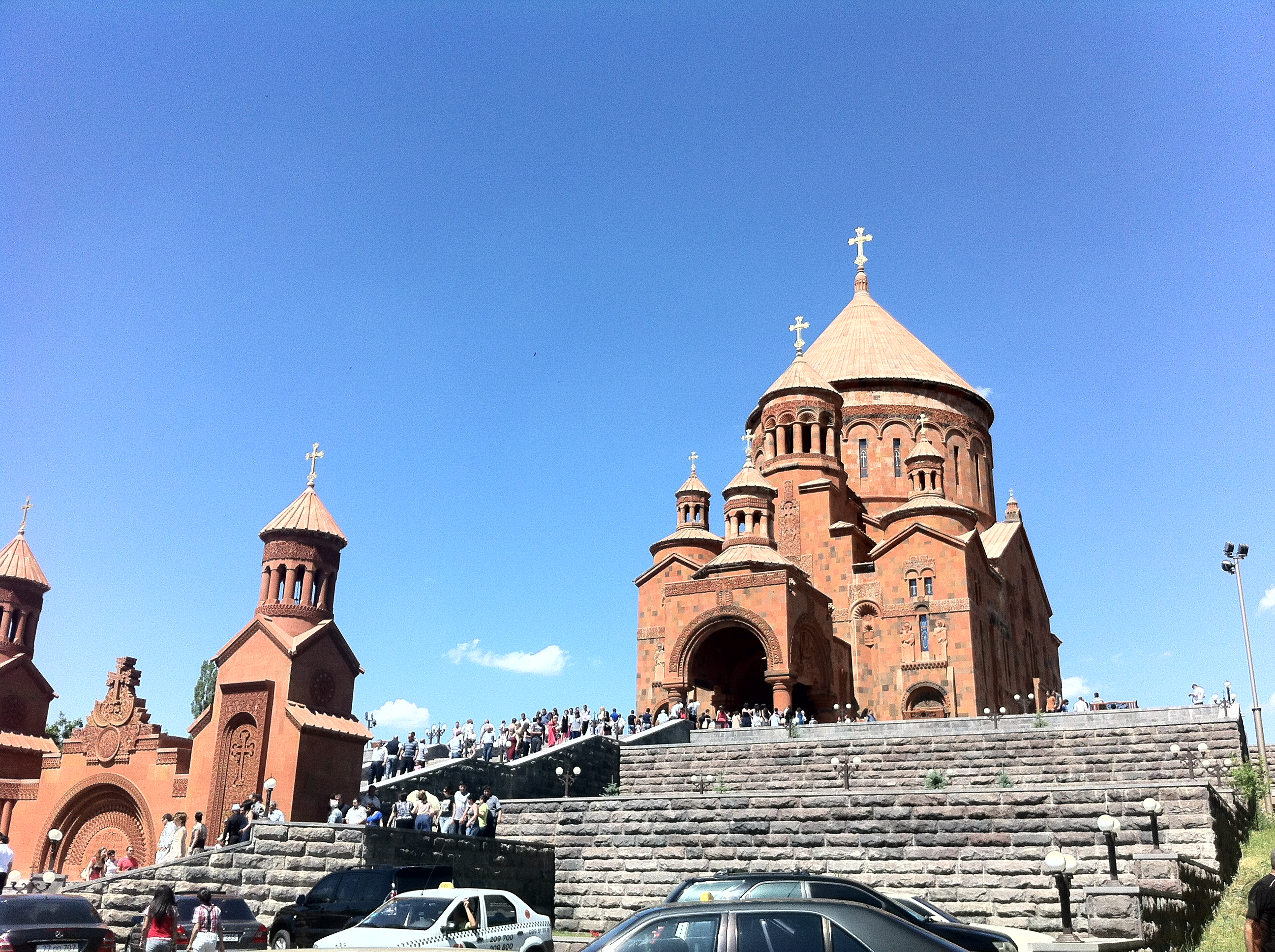
General view

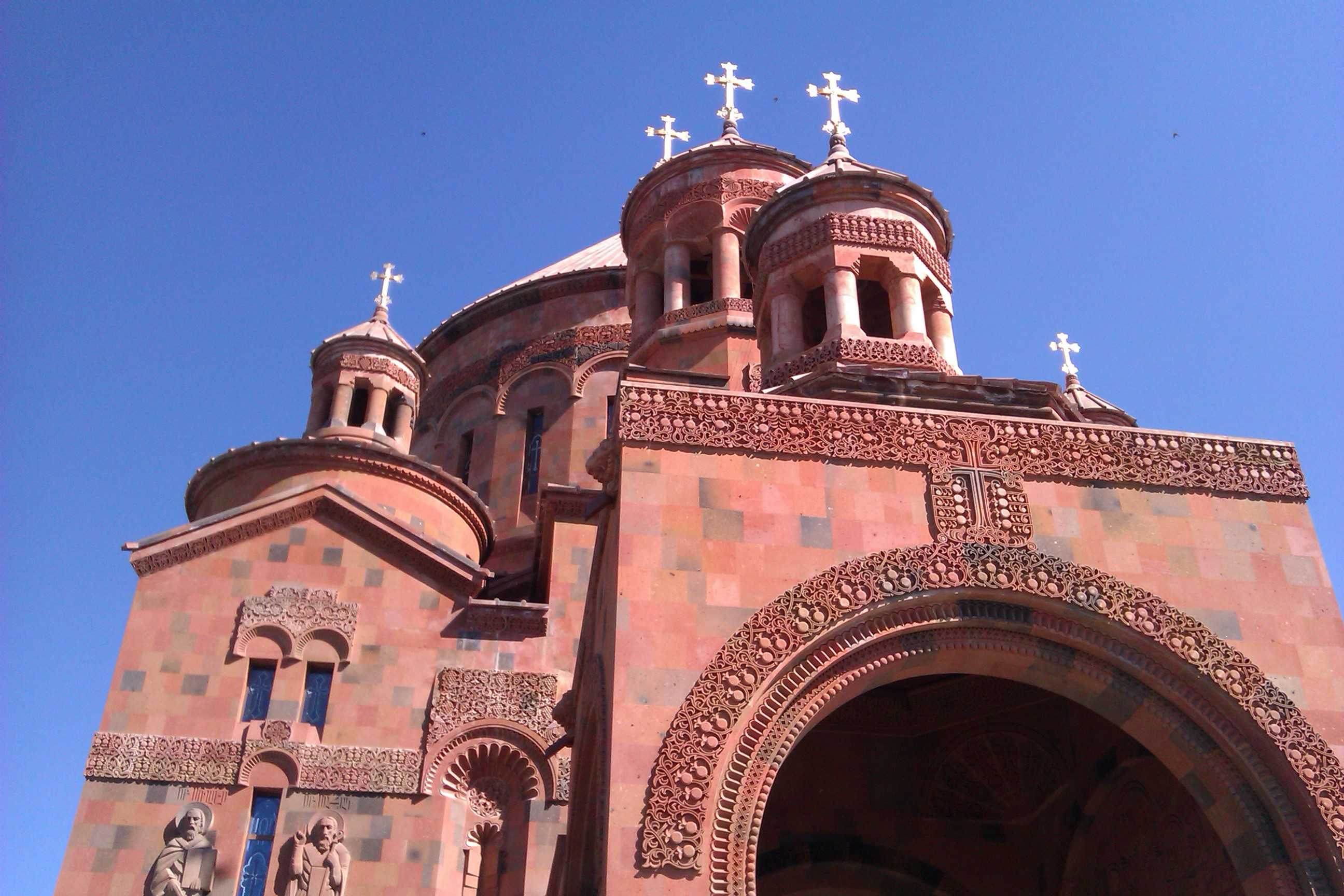
The belfry and the domes at the main entrance

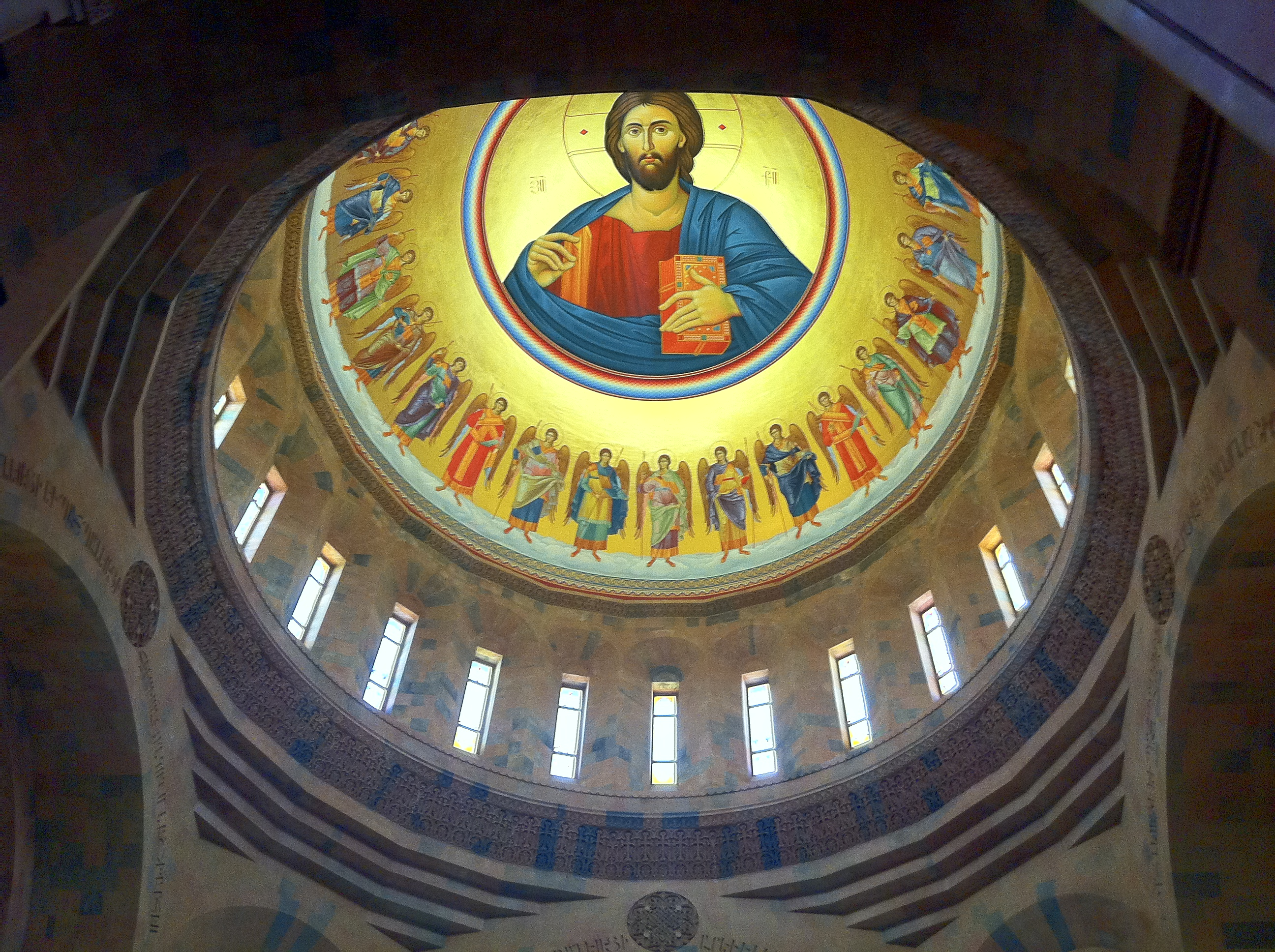
Internal view of the central dome

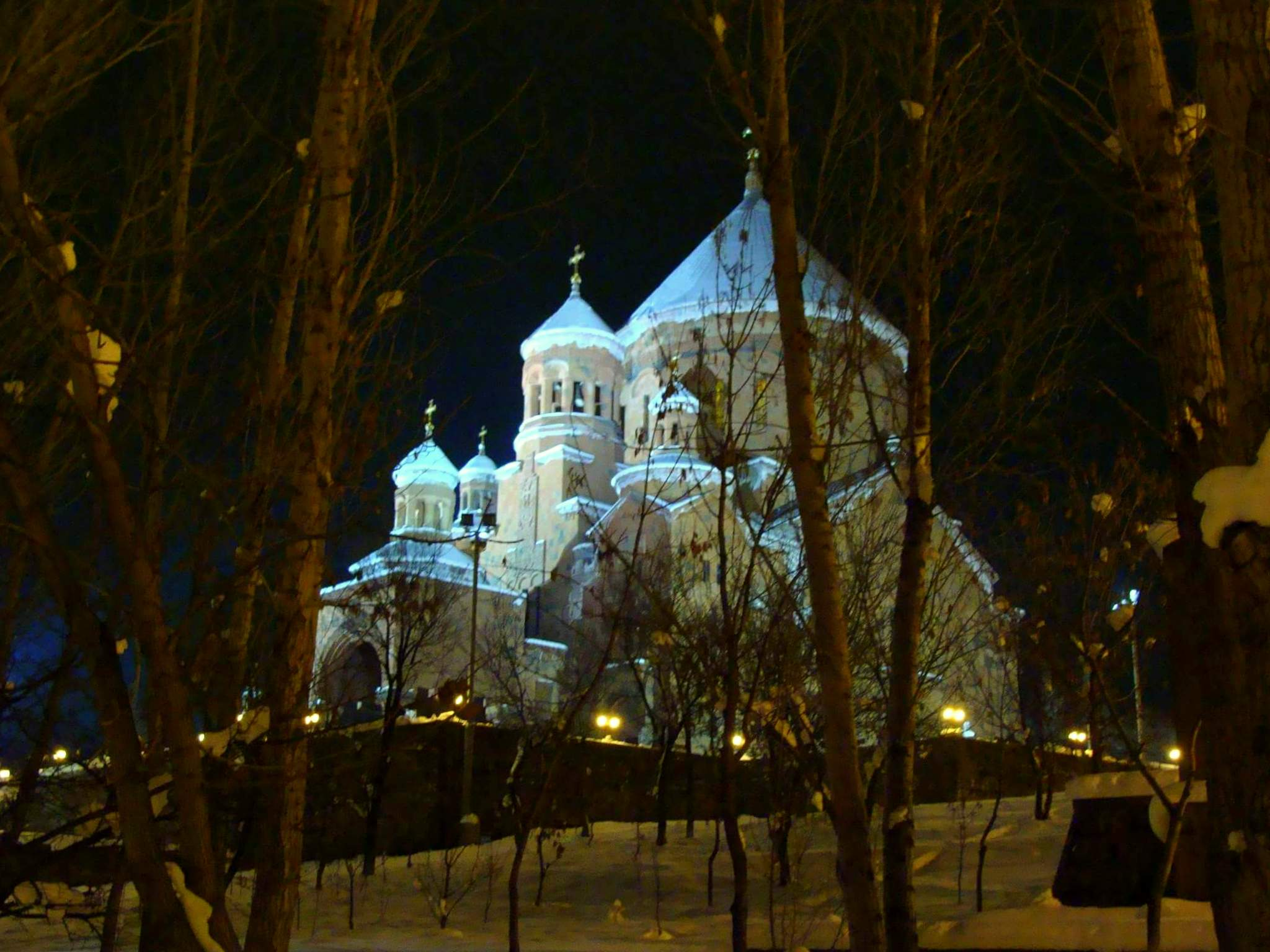
The church at Christmas Eve (5 January 2016)

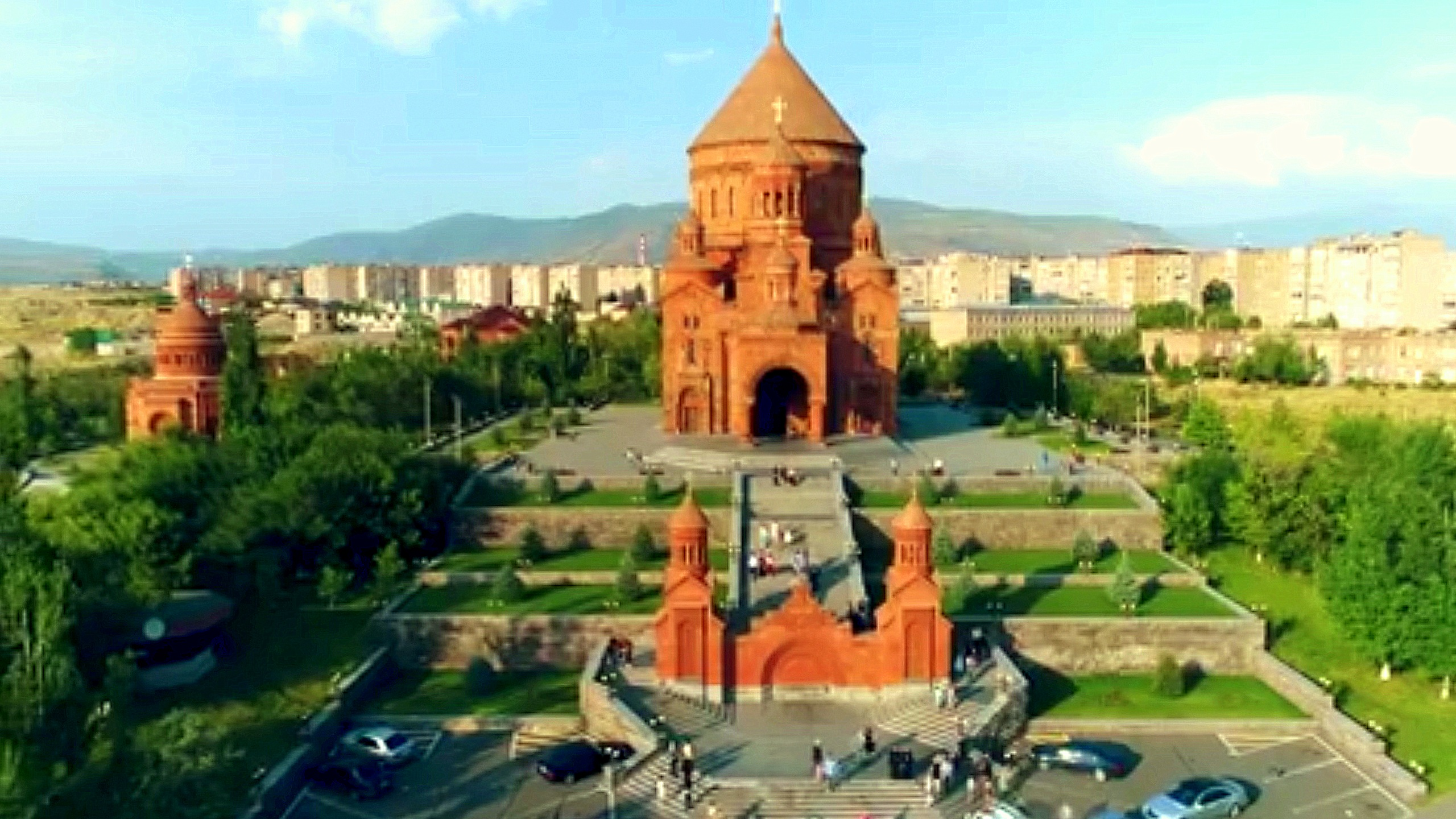
General view
