= Abovyan =

City in Kotayk, Armenia

Abovyan Աբովյան
- Town
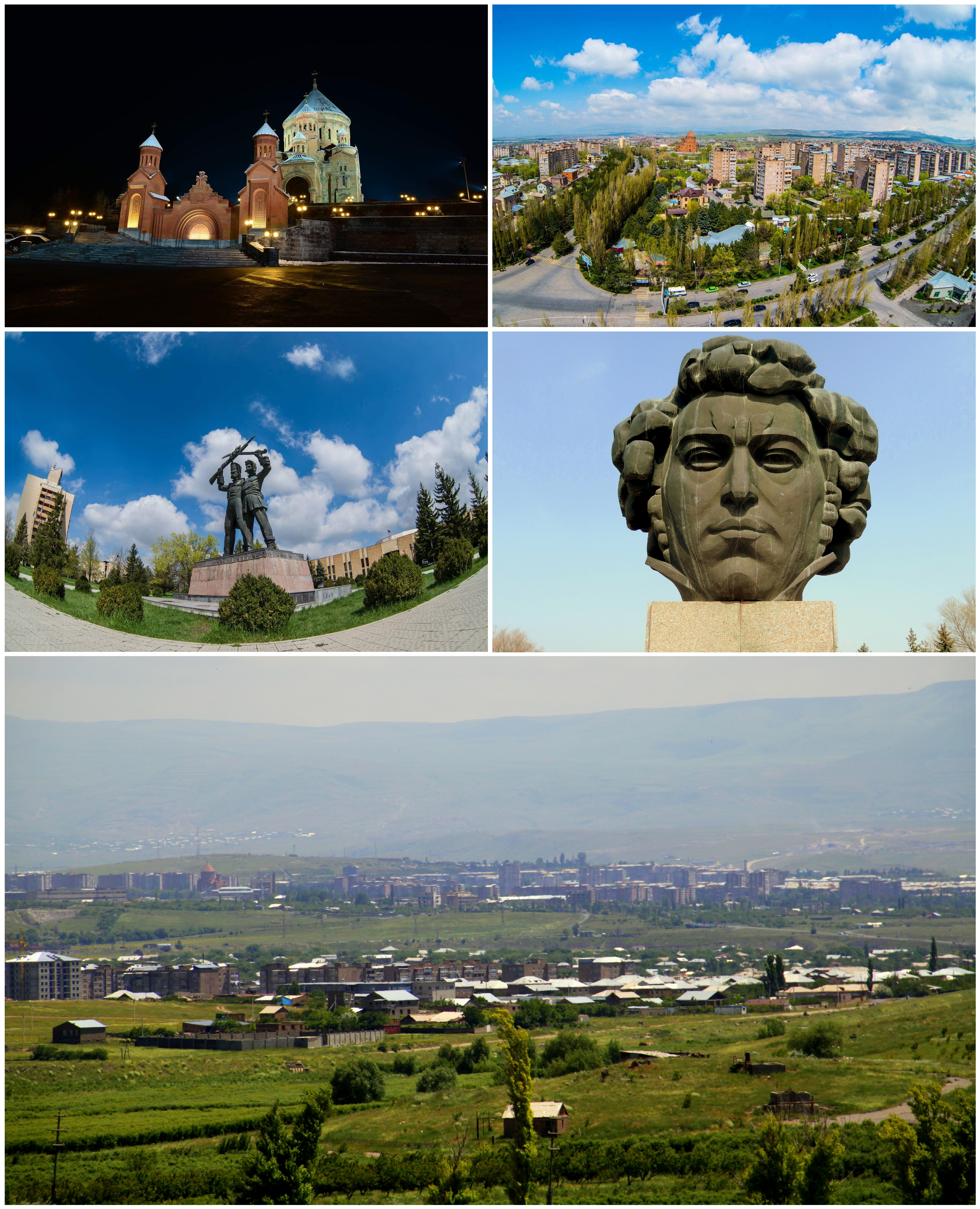
- From top left: Surp Hovhannes Church • Abovyan skyline Friendship Square • Khachatur Abovyan's bust General view of Abovyan

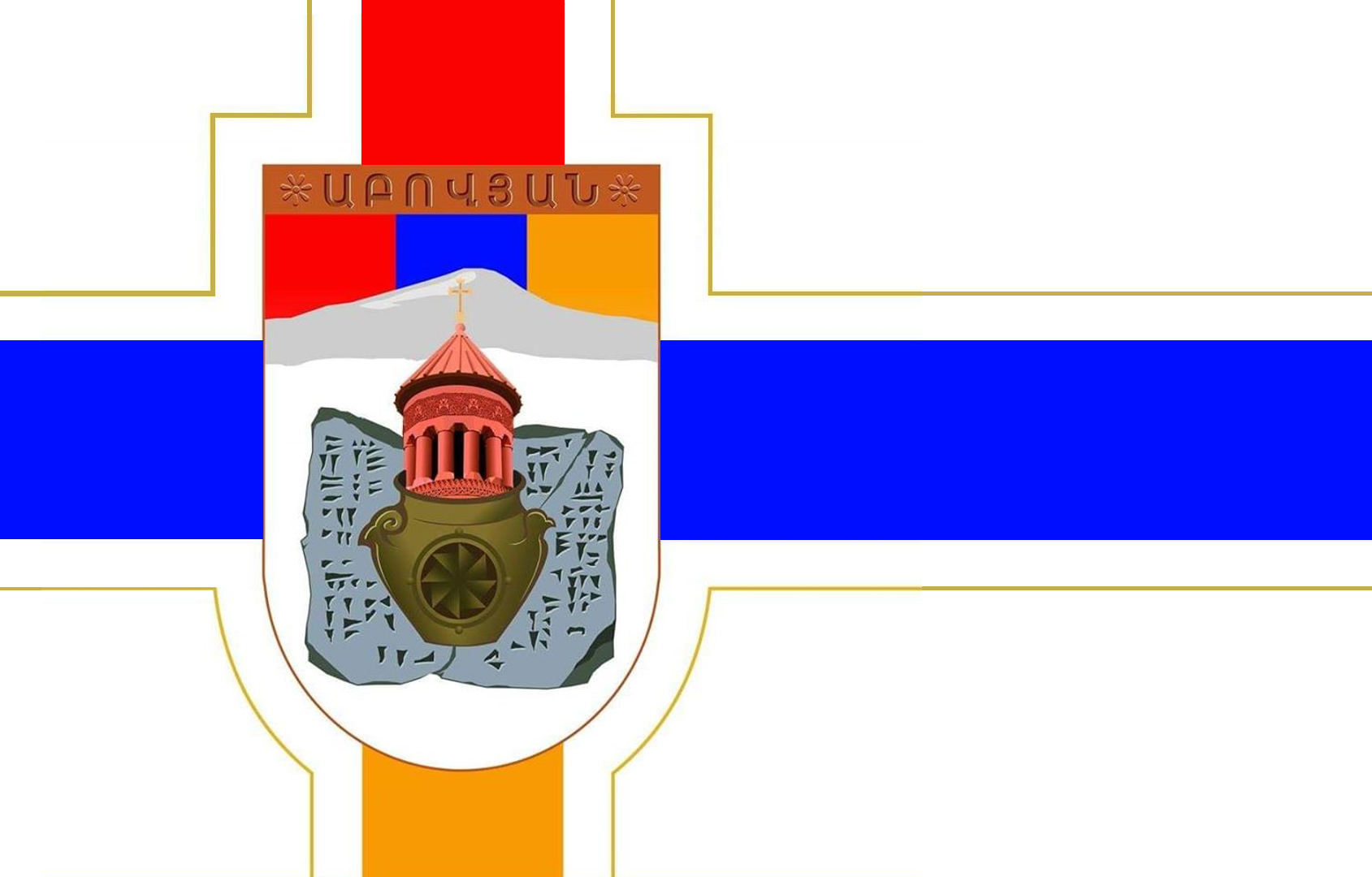
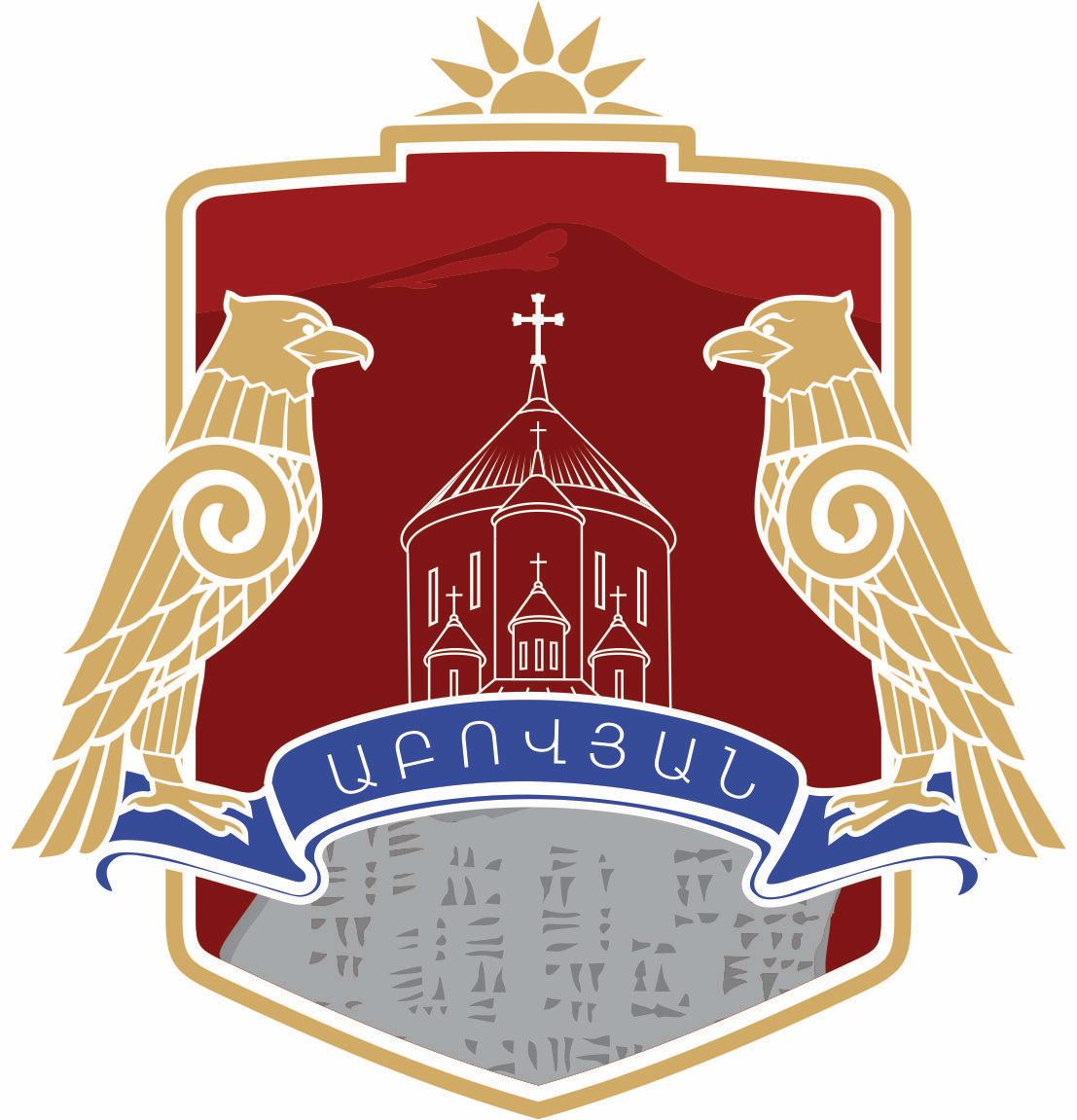
- Flag Coat of arms

- Location within Armenia
- Coordinates: 40°16′26″N 44°37′32″E
- Country: Armenia
- Marz (province): Kotayk
- Founded: 1963

Area
  - Total: 11 km^{2} (4.2 sq mi)
- Elevation: 1,450 m (4,760 ft)

Population (2022 census)
  - Total: 46,434
  - Density: 4,200/km^{2} (11,000/sq mi)
- Time zone: UTC+4 (UTC)
- Area code: (+374)222
- Website: Official website

Abovyan or Abovian (Armenian: Աբովյան [ɑbɔvˈjɑn]) is a town and urban municipal community in Armenia within the Kotayk Province. It is located 16 kilometres (10 miles) northeast of Yerevan and 32 kilometres (20 miles) southeast of the province centre Hrazdan. As of the 2022 census, the population of the town was 46,434.

With a motorway and railway running through the city connecting Yerevan with the areas of the northeast, Abovyan is considered a satellite city of the Armenian capital. Therefore, Abovyan is generally known as the "northern gate of Yerevan".

Abovyan covers an area of around 11 square kilometres (4.2 square miles).

== Etymology ==
The site of present-day Abovyan was previously occupied by a small village known as Elar. One folk tradition connects the name Elar with the legend of Ara the Handsome: the Assyrian queen Semiramis is said to have brought the body of the murdered Armenian king to the village and ordered the inhabitants to shout "el Ara", meaning "arise, Ara" in Armenian, from which the name Elar supposedly originated. On October 12, 1961, Soviet Armenian authorities renamed the village Abovyan after the prominent Armenian writer Khachatur Abovian. The decision followed an earlier suggestion to rename the community made by Anastas Mikoyan during his 1954 visit to Armenia.

== History ==
During excavations in the 1860s led by historian Mesrop Smbatiants, the remains of a 2nd-millennium BC Cyclopean fortress, an ancient cemetery and old shelters with several objects from the three stages of the Bronze Age were found near Abovyan.

Smbatiants also found an 8th-century BC Urartian cuneiform inscription left by King Argishti I, referring to the conquest of the "land of Darani" (the pre-Urartian name of the modern-day Abovyan area). The excavations led by Smbatiants revealed that the area of modern-day Abovyan was inhabited starting from the end of the 4th century BC. During the ancient Kingdom of Armenia, the western area of modern-day Abovyan was part of the Kotayk canton of Ayrarat province, while the eastern area was part of the Mazaz canton of the same province.

Between the 5th and 7th centuries AD, the region was granted to the Amatuni Armenian noble dynasty.

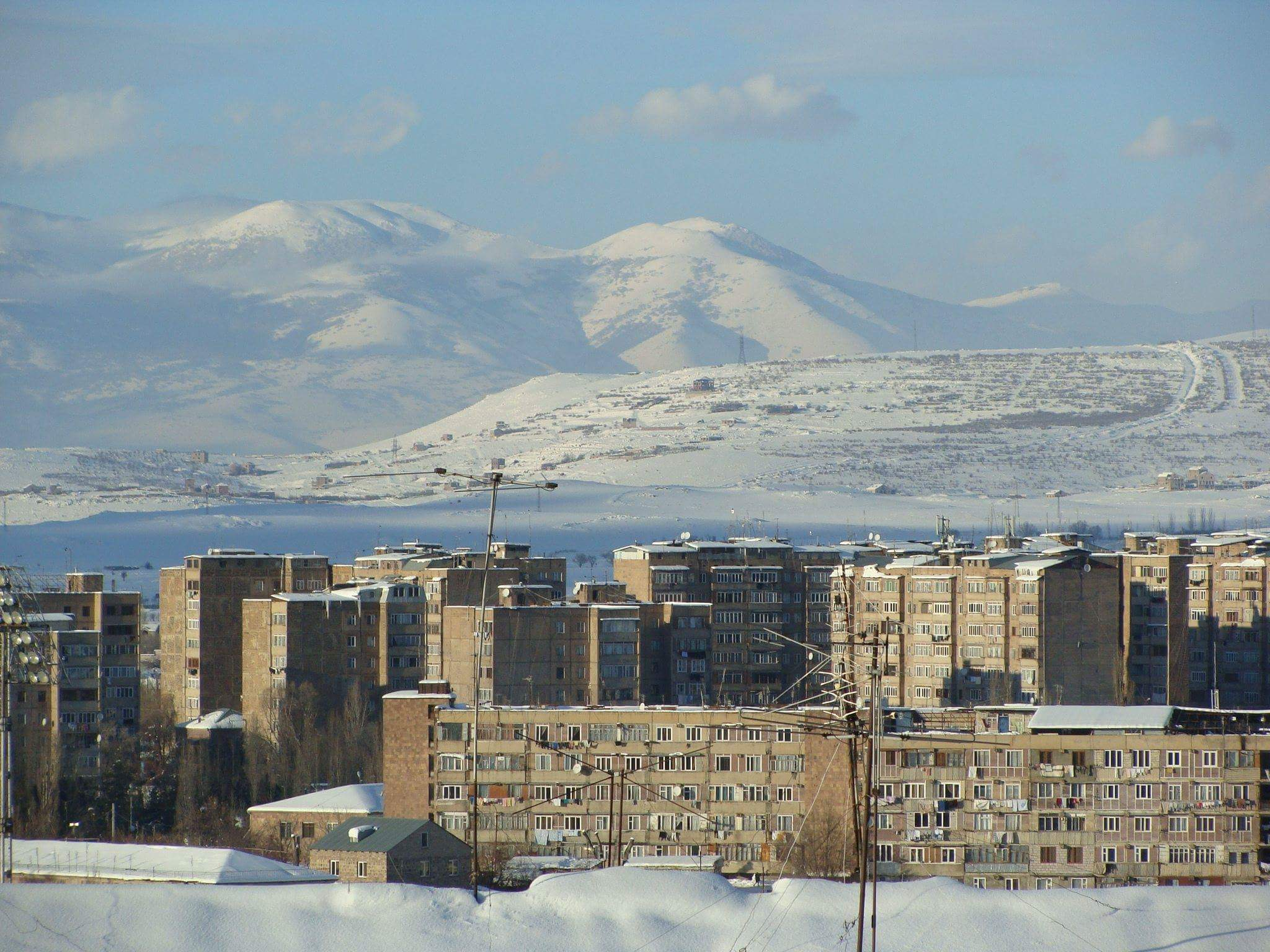
Mount Ara overlooking the town from the northwest

After the Seljuk invasion of Armenia, the area became known as Elar. According to the 13th-century Armenian historian Stepanos Orbelian, Elar became part of the Kingdom of Georgia. Later, the region of Elar was granted to prince Liparit Orbeli of the Orbelian Dynasty by prince Ivane Mkhargrdzeli.

By the beginning of the 16th century, Eastern Armenia fell under the Persian rule, and Elar became part of the Erivan Beylerbeylik and later of the Erivan Khanate. After the Russian conquest of Armenia in 1828, Elar became part of the Armenian Oblast and subsequently of the Erivan Governorate formed in 1850. At the time of the Russian conquest in 1828, Elar had a purely Armenian population consisting of 158 people, of whom 88 were of local origin and 70 were from Western Armenia, or Iran.

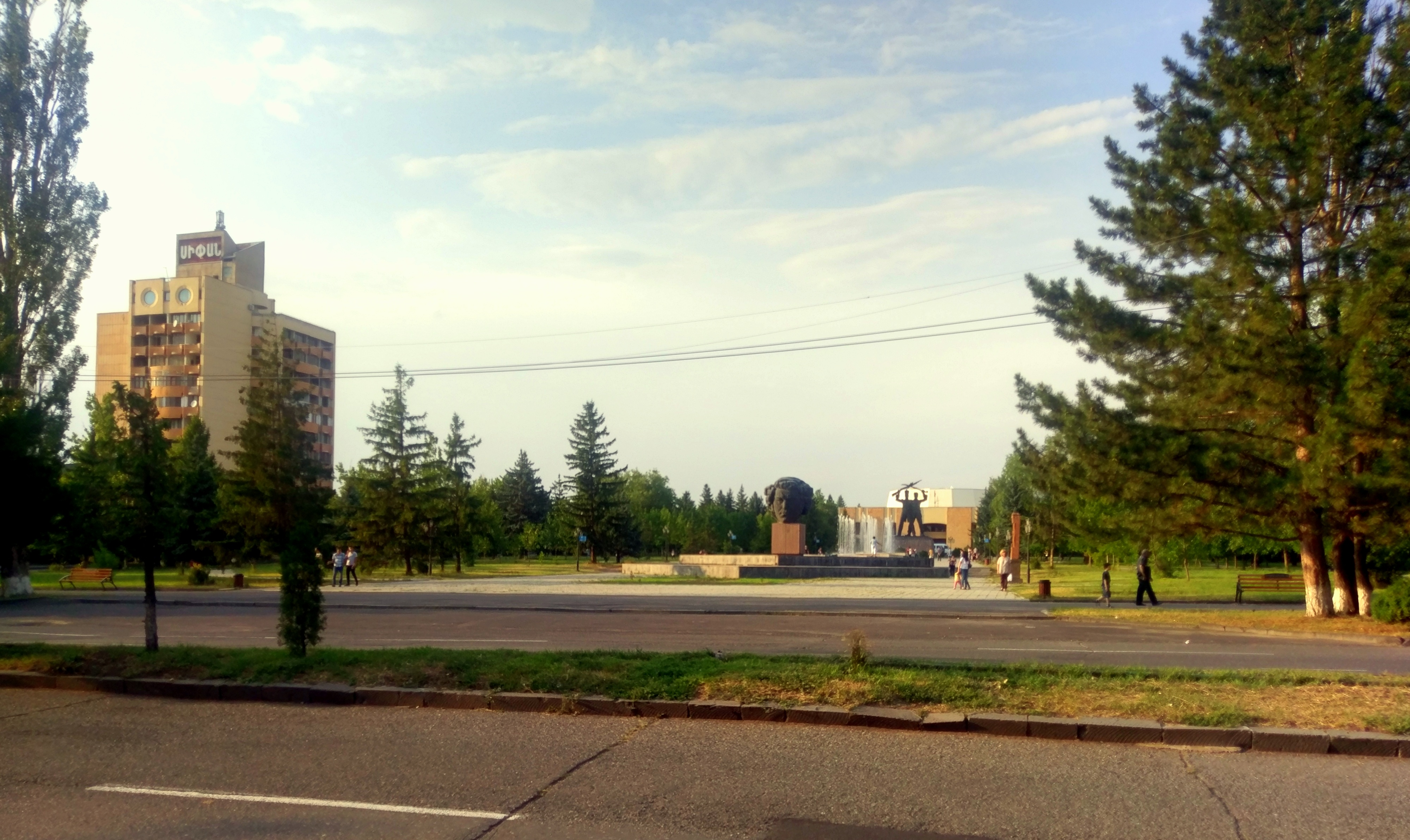
Sipan hotel and the Abovyan town hall

The small village of Elar (currently part of Abovyan) remained the largest settlement in the area until October 1961, when it was renamed Abovyan in honour of Khachatur Abovian. Two years later, in 1963, the Soviet Armenian government elevated the town of Abovyan to city status and expanded it to include surrounding areas.

The modern town developed in 1962–63 on a plateau located between Hrazdan and Azat rivers. It rapidly developed as an industrial centre within the Armenian SSR. The town was planned to include eight residential neighbourhoods (locally known as micro-districts), and an industrial district.

== Geography and climate ==
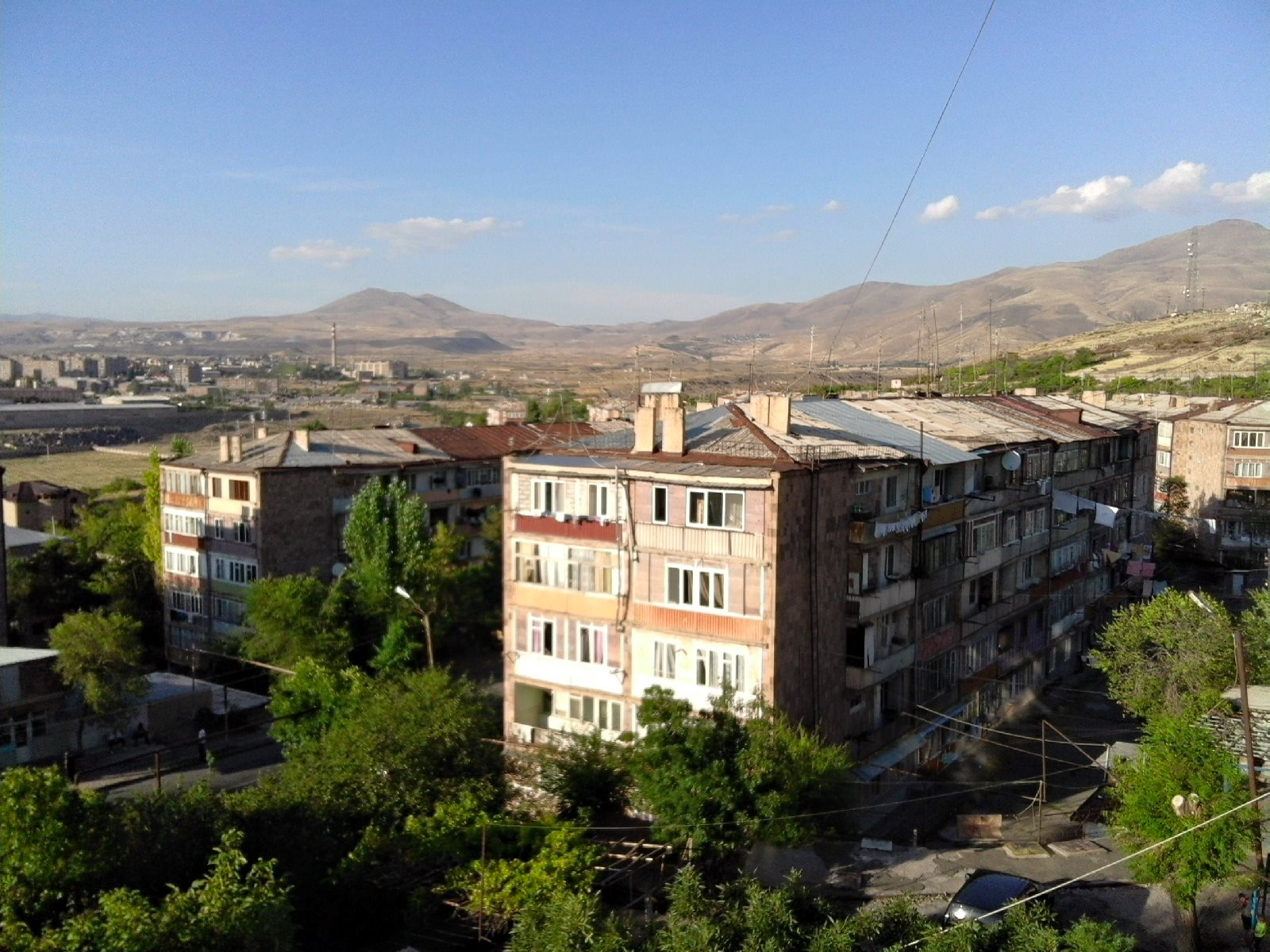
Abovyan and Mount Hatis

Abovyan is built on the Kotayk plateau between the rivers of Hrazdan, Azat and Getar at a height of 1,450 metres (4,760 feet) above sea level. It is surrounded by Gutanasar volcano of the Gegham mountains from the north, Mount Hatis from the east, the heights of Nork from the south, Hrazdan gorge from the west and Mount Ara from the northwest. The climate is Humid continental (Köppen: Dfb) and dry with relatively hot summers and cold winters.

Climate data for Abovyan
Month	Jan	Feb	Mar	Apr	May	Jun	Jul	Aug	Sep	Oct	Nov	Dec	Year
Mean daily maximum °C (°F)	0.6 (33.1)	2.0 (35.6)	7.6 (45.7)	14.3 (57.7)	19.5 (67.1)	24.0 (75.2)	27.9 (82.2)	27.6 (81.7)	23.9 (75.0)	17.4 (63.3)	9.8 (49.6)	3.2 (37.8)	14.8 (58.7)
Daily mean °C (°F)	−4.0 (24.8)	−2.7 (27.1)	2.5 (36.5)	8.4 (47.1)	13.1 (55.6)	17.1 (62.8)	20.8 (69.4)	20.6 (69.1)	16.4 (61.5)	10.8 (51.4)	4.6 (40.3)	−1.1 (30.0)	8.9 (48.0)
Mean daily minimum °C (°F)	−8.5 (16.7)	−7.3 (18.9)	−2.6 (27.3)	2.5 (36.5)	6.8 (44.2)	10.3 (50.5)	13.7 (56.7)	13.6 (56.5)	9.0 (48.2)	4.2 (39.6)	−0.6 (30.9)	−5.3 (22.5)	3.0 (37.4)
Average precipitation mm (inches)	18 (0.7)	22 (0.9)	30 (1.2)	46 (1.8)	71 (2.8)	53 (2.1)	31 (1.2)	25 (1.0)	22 (0.9)	34 (1.3)	26 (1.0)	18 (0.7)	396 (15.6)
Source: Climate-Data.org

== Demographics ==
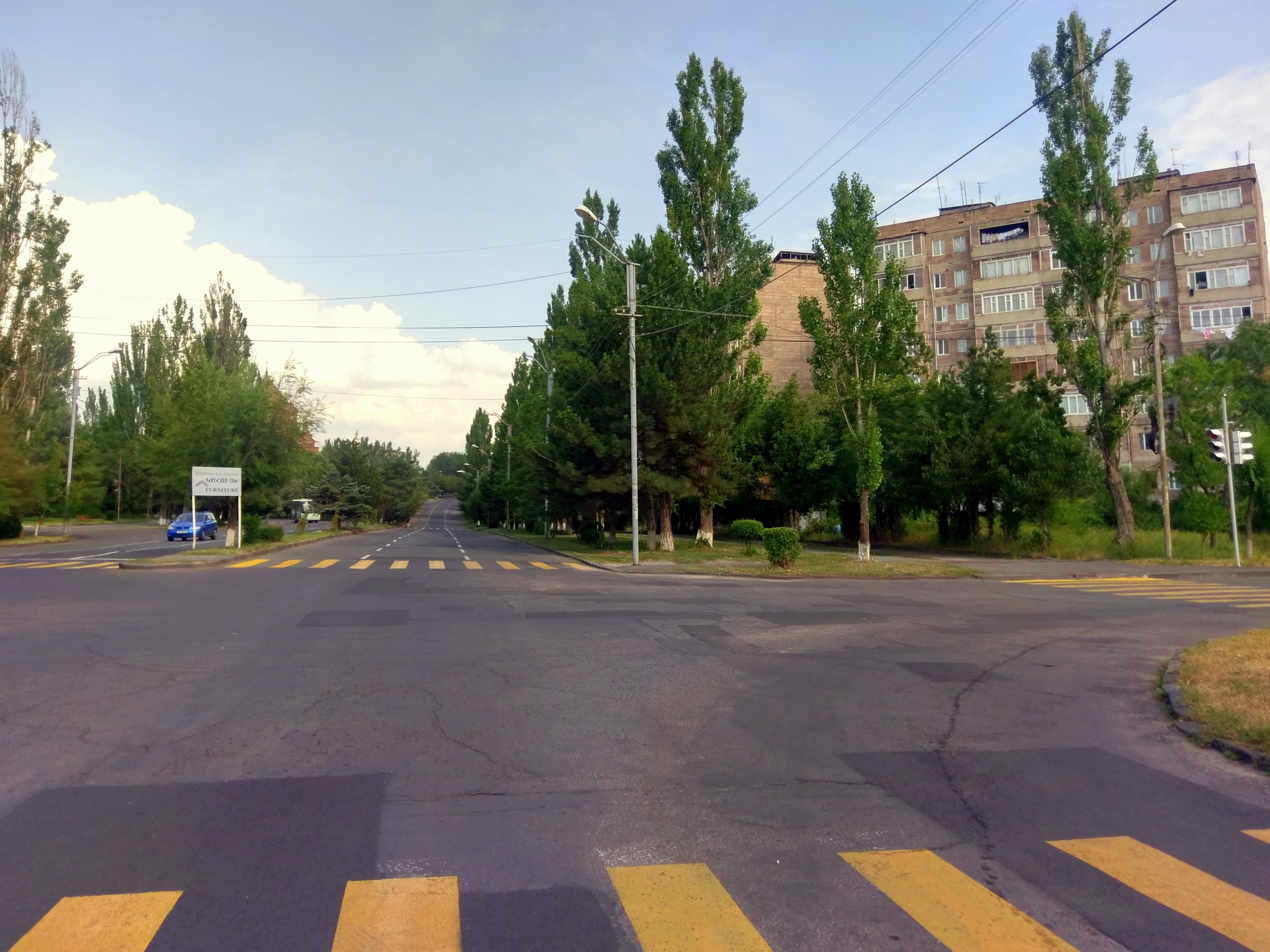
Rossiya street

=== Population ===
More than 90% of the town's population are ethnic Armenians․ According to data from 1974, approximately one third of the town's population consisted of Armenians who were relocated from Syria, Iran and Lebanon during the 1960s.

Small communities of Kurds, Yazidis, Russians and Assyrians also live in the town.

Historical population
Year	Pop.	±% p.a.
1873	360	—
1897	548	+1.77%
1926	897	+1.71%
1939	1,024	+1.02%
1959	2,289	+4.10%
1970	14,700	+18.42%
1973	28,500	+24.69%
1976	38,400	+10.45%
1989	58,671	+3.31%
2001	44,596	−2.26%
2011	43,495	−0.25%
2022	46,434	+0.60%
2024	47,546	+1.19%

=== Religion ===
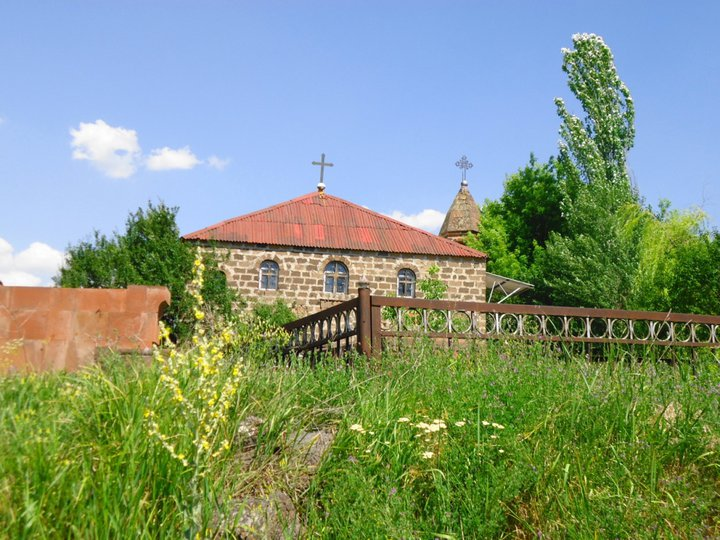
Surp Stepanos Church of 1851

The majority of the population of Abovyan are Armenians who belong to the Armenian Apostolic Church.

The oldest standing church in the town is the Surp Stepanos church dating back to 1851. It remained closed since the Soviet days until 2010 when it was entirely renovated and reopened for the public on 28 November of the same year.

The other church of the town is the Saint John the Baptist Church opened in 2013 by the efforts of the Armenian businessman Gagik Tsarukyan. The architect of the church is Artak Ghulyan. It is one of the largest places of worship in Armenia.

There is a small Molokan Russian community in the town.

== Culture ==
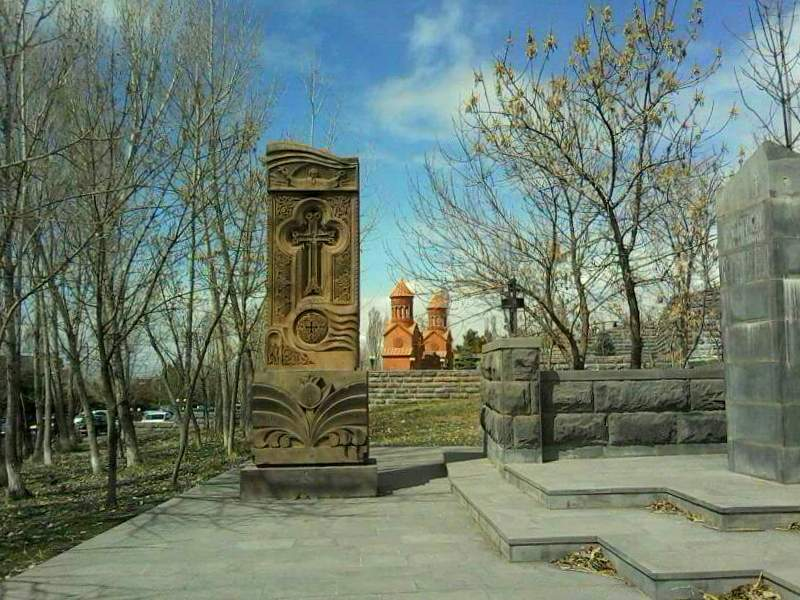
A khachkar in Abovyan

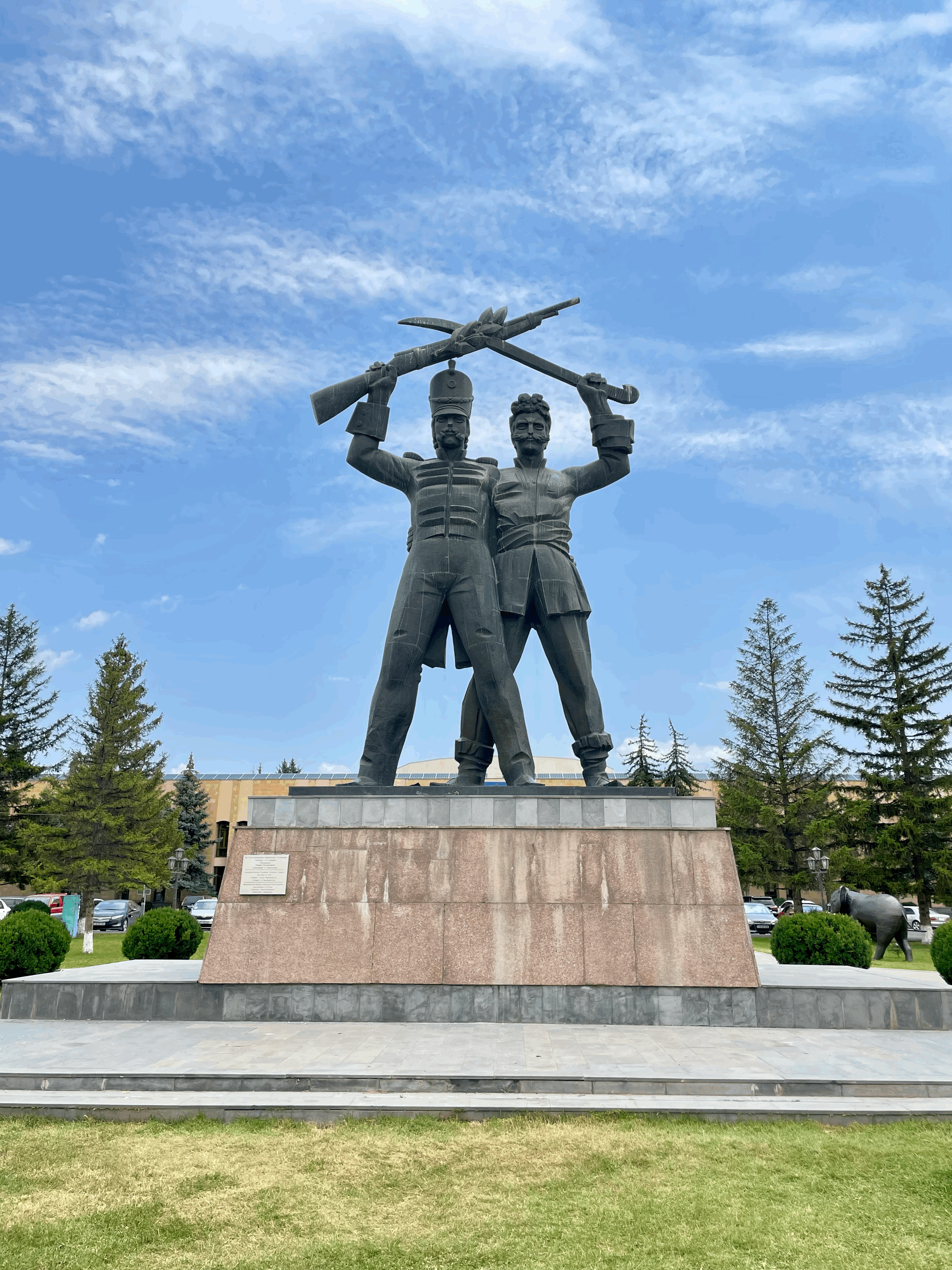
Armenian-Russian friendship statue

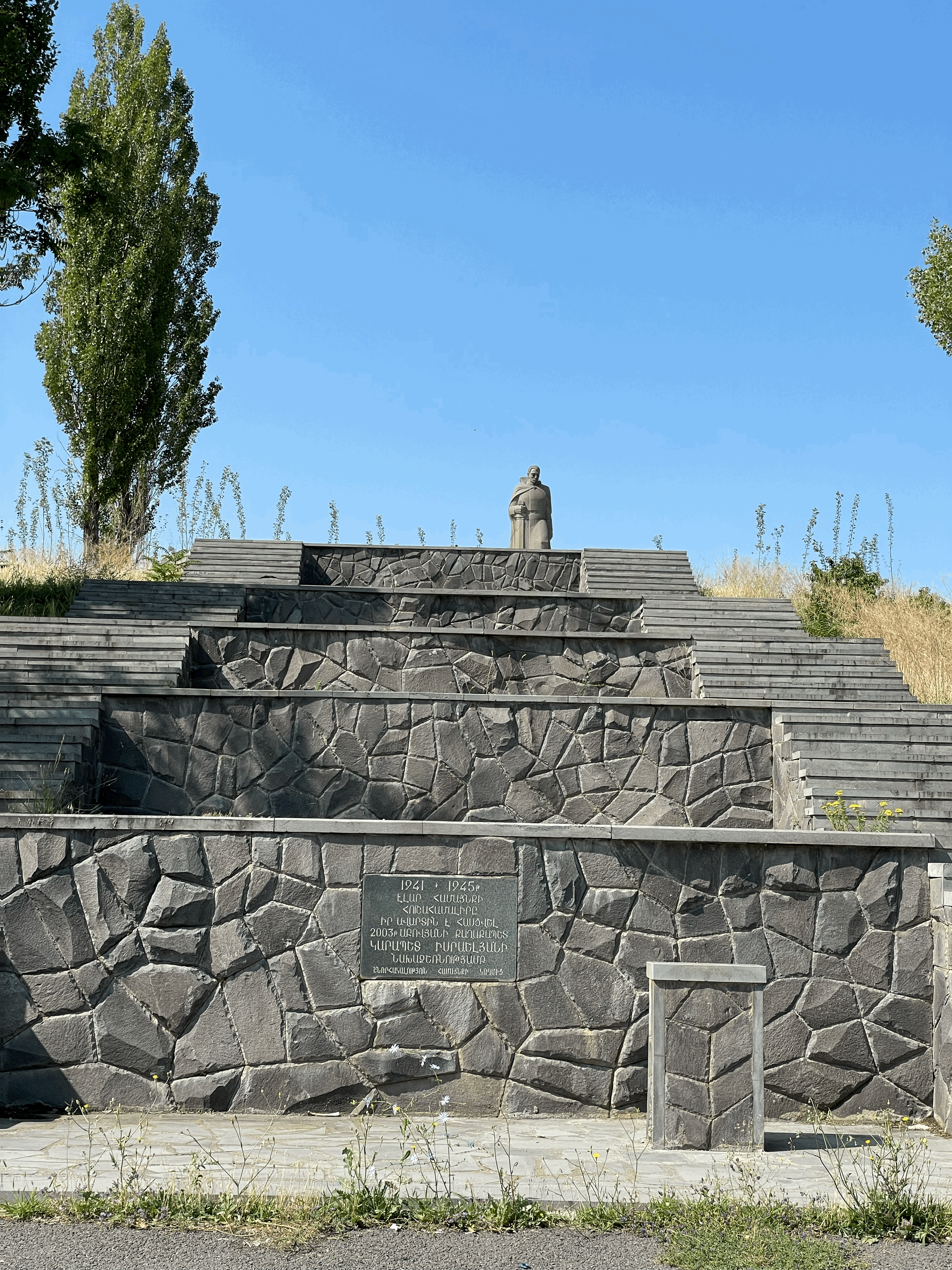
Memorial to the soldiers who died in World War II

Abovyan has a cultural palace, a public library and a community creative centre for children and teenagers. The town is also home to a museum dedicated to the brotherhood and friendship between the Armenian and Russian nations, opened in 1982. The recently renovated theatre of Abovyan has a regular schedule of theatrical shows.

Abovyan day is celebrated every year in mid October.

The town had a cinema in Soviet times, which has since been converted into a shopping centre.

In 2022, it was announced that Abovyan will be the destination from which to view and visit the World's Largest Statute of Jesus Christ to be erected on Mt. Hatis, accessible by road and aerial lift cable cars estimated to be completed in 2025. In the process of construction, an ancient fortress was discovered in the top of Mt. Hatis.

== Transportation ==
Being located just northeast of Yerevan, Abovyan is connected with capital city with buses and minibuses. The H-1 Road connects Abovyan with Yerevan, while the M-4 Motorway connects the town with the rest of Armenia.

Being a satellite town of the capital Yerevan, Abovyan is connected with the capital city with public modern buses, made in China.

== Economy ==
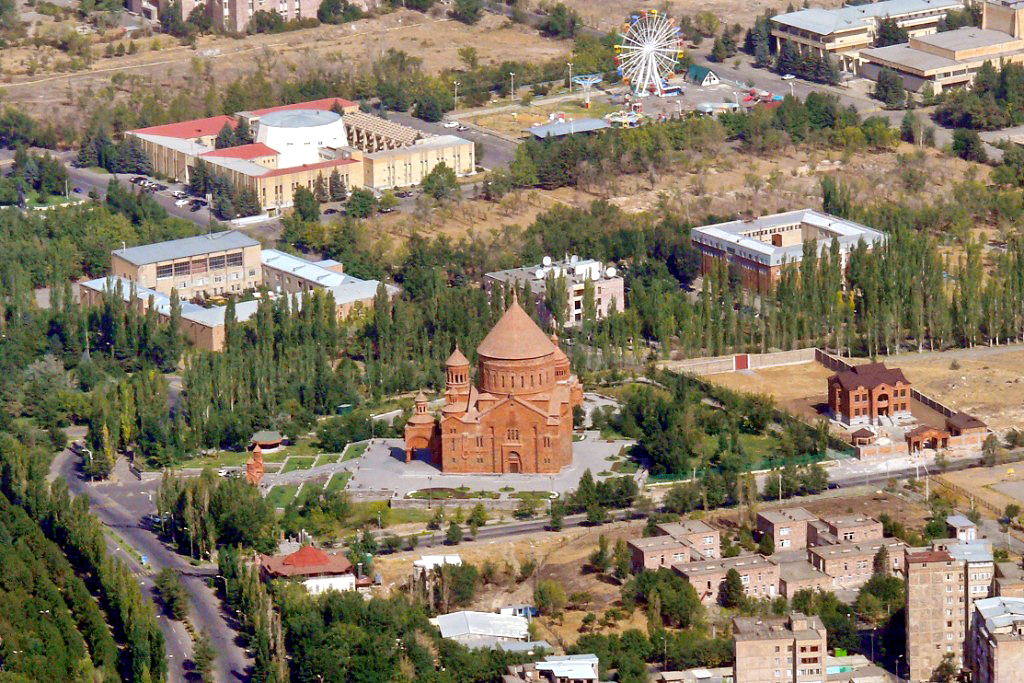
Aerial view of the town's centre

Abovyan was founded in the Soviet era as an industrial town. It used to have many large industrial firms until the fall of the Soviet Union, including a concrete factory, a stone-processing plant and a chemicals factory. The town has an industrial district located to the south of the town. The sector is quite diversified, including several types of finished goods and services, such as building materials, processed food and beverages, pharmaceuticals, and polymer products.

Major firms for building materials production include the Suardi Armenia Factory since 1963, Armstone Plant since 1996, Multi Group Stone since 2002, and Italasphalt Factory since 2015. Alcoholic beverages are also produced by several factories including the Samkon Brandy Factory since 1970, Kotayk Brewery since 1974, and the Ginevan Factory for wine, brandy, beer and canned food, since 2011. The Arpimed Pharmaceutical Enterprise has been operating since 1999, while the Poli-Serv Factory for polymer products has been operating since 2001. Processed food has been produced by Tamara Factory for dairy products and sweets since 1988, by the Luma Factory for meat products and chips since 1995, by the Sipan Plant for canned food and soft drinks since 2003, and by the Tamara Food Enterprise for convenience food since 2007.

== Education ==
As of 2015, Abovyan has 10 public education schools, nine kindergartens and two state intermediate colleges. Two major science institutions and research centres are located in Abovyan: the Republican Hospital of tuberculosis, and the Institute of Biological Microbes of the Armenian National Academy of Sciences. The town has a musical academy as well as an arts school.

The town is home to the headquarters of AbovAcademy.com, named as homage to Khachatur Abovian, the largest technology career center and tutoring program in the Province of Kotayk.

== Sport ==
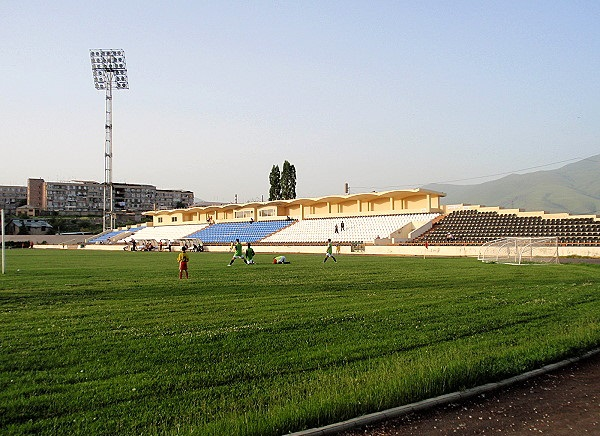
Abovyan City Stadium

FC Kotayk founded in 1955, is one of the oldest football clubs in Armenia who represented Abovyan until 2005. Like many other football clubs in the country, FC Kotayk was forced to default from the Armenian football league and consequently from professional football in 2005, due to financial difficulties.

The short-lived King Delux FC represented the town in a single season of the Armenian First League in 2012–13 before going defunct. It is now home to FC Noah, who in 2025 were crowned the 2024–25 Armenian Premier League Champions. The town is home to the Vahagn Tumasyan Stadium opened in 1966 with a seating capacity of 3,100.

== Notable people ==
- Marat Aleksanian, Armenian politician
- Vanes Martirosyan, Armenian-American professional boxer
- Masis Voskanyan, Armenian footballer

== International relations ==
=== Twin towns – Sister cities ===
Abovyan is twinned with:

- Villeurbanne, Rhône-Alpes, France, since 1990.

== See also ==
- Khachatur Abovian
