= Eurnekian School =

Coordinates: 40°09′30″N 44°17′31″E

- Էօրնեկեան հանրակրթական դպրոց

Location
- Issy-les-Moulineaux Street; Vagharshapat; Armenia

Information
- School type: Public
- Motto: To know wisdom and instruction, to understand words of insight
- Established: 1 September 2009
- Principal: Bishop Vardan Navasardyan
- Head of school: Susanna Vardanyan
- Staff: 60
- Grades: 1-12
- Gender: Mixed
- Enrollment: 471
- Language: Armenian, English, Russian, German
- Athletics: Table tennis, mini football, chess
- Affiliation: Mother See of Holy Etchmiadzin; Ministry of Education of Armenia; Eurnekian Public Educational Foundation
- Website: eurnekianschool.am

Eurnekian School (Armenian: Էօրնեկեան հանրակրթական դպրոց), is a public school in Vagharshapat, Armavir Province, Armenia, affiliated with the Mother See of Holy Etchmiadzin which is the regulating body of the Armenian Apostolic Church. The school is supervised by the Eurnekian Public Educational Foundation.

== Overview ==
Eurnekian School was opened on 1 September 2009 with 80 students, on the basis of No. 13 School of Vagharshapat operating since 1959. The foundation of Eurnekian School was initiated by Catholicos Karekin II and fulfilled through the financial assistance of the Argentine-Armenian businessman Eduardo Eurnekian. The school was housed within the building of No. 13 School of Vagharshapat between 2009 and 2017.

The new building of the school is located within the territory of the Mother See complex, near the southern wall. The construction was launched in 2012 and fulfilled through donations from Eduardo Eurnekian. The official inauguration ceremony took place on 14 September 2017, for the 2017-18 educational year. It was attended by president Serzh Sargsyan, Catholicos Karekin II, along with the benefactor himself.

The building is designed by the renowned architect Artak Ghulyan. The ground floor of the building is home to the library, the reading hall and many sport halls. The 1st and 2nd floors are home to 32 classrooms, 8 laboratories, events hall, healthcare clinic and meeting rooms.

As of 2017-18 educational year, 471 students are studying at the school from 1st to 12th grades. The school is able to accommodate up to 600 students. The maximum capacity of each classrooms is 15 seats. The students are mainly from the town of Vagharshapat, as well as from the nearby villages within Armavir Province. The school has students from the capital Yerevan as well.

Eurnekian School is the first school in Armenia that operates under the management of the Mother See of Holy Etchmiadzin.
