= Hripsime Margaryan =

Armenian artist (born 1975)

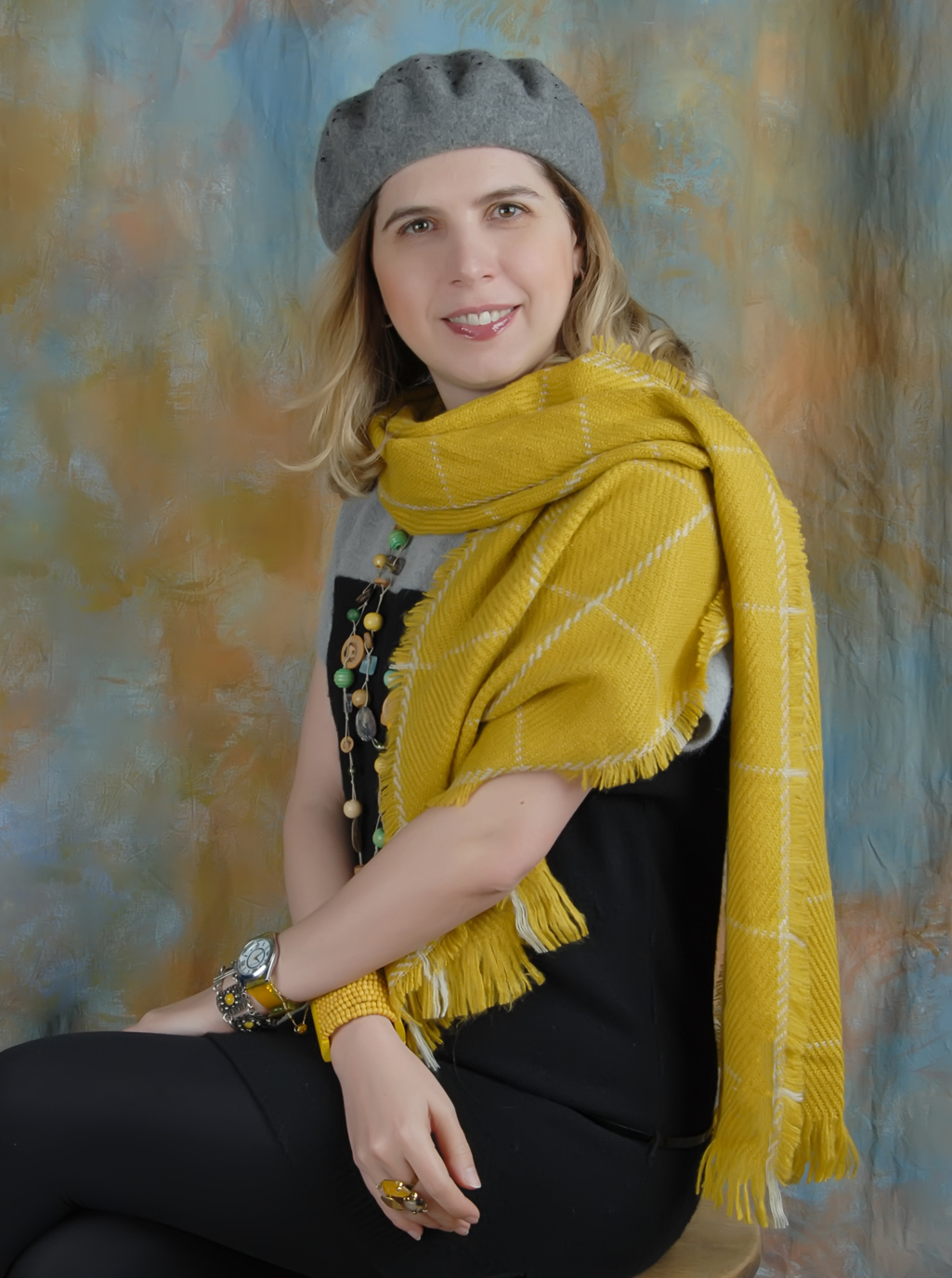
- Born: Hripsime Margaryan; November 13, 1975 (age 50); Yerevan, Armenia
- Education: Yerevan State Academy of Fine Arts
- Known for: paintings

Hripsime Margaryan (Armenian: Հռիփսիմե Մարգարյան; born November 13, 1975, in Yerevan) is an Armenian artist.

== Biography ==
Hripsime Margaryan was born in 1975 in Yerevan in the artistic family of Volodya Margaryan. In 1992 Hripsime graduated from the school N 56 and N 1 Art school in Yerevan. During 1992-1993 she studied in the Open University of Armenia in the department of fashion design. She was involved at Yerevan State Academy of Fine Arts, Yerevan, Armenia (1992-1998). Since 1998 Hripsime Margaryan is a member of Armenian Designers Union, Member of the International Designers’ Association (1998), Member of the Artists' Union of Armenia (1999), Member of the International Association of Art (UNESCO, 1999).

During 1998 – 2000 Margaryan was graphic designer in advertising agencies "Azd", "Paradise", "Arlita", from 2001 – 2003 she issued labels on wine and brandy at the Gharabagh Gold factory and Yerevan Champagne Wines Factory, from 2008 to 2009 she worked at the concert and sports complex named after Karen Demirchyan as an interior design. Since 2012 she is the director of the Valmar Art Gallery.

In 2014 Hripsime Margaryan's works were included in the design of the disc of piano works by Alan Hovhannes. Since 2015 she has been a professor of drawing and painting at the Department of Drawing, Painting and Sculpture of the National University of Architecture and Construction. In 2016 she worked on the design of the cover of the book Smoldering yearning by Mushegh Babayan.

== Exhibitions ==
Hripsime Margaryan participated and takes part in different exhibition in Armenia and abroad

- 2018 "Women in Art for Peace" exhibition, European Union, Brussels, Belgium
- 2018 Artists Union of Armenia, exhibition dedicated to Women's day, Yerevan, Armenia
- 2018 "Women in Art for Peace" exhibition, European Union, Strasbourg, France
- 2017 "Women in Art for Peace" exhibition, European Union, Manama, Bahrain
- 2017 ART Third Annual International Expo, Armenian Center for Contemporary Experimental Art, NPAK, Yerevan, Armenia
- 2016 The Municipality of Yerevan. Exhibition dedicated to the 90th anniversary of the National University of Architecture and Construction, Yerevan, Armenia.
- 2015 Artists Union of Armenia. Exhibition dedicated to the 25th anniversary of Independence. Yerevan, Armenia.
- 2014 Exhibition Hall of the National Assembly of Armenia. Individual exhibition. Yerevan, Armenia.
- 2013 Artists Union of Armenia. Exhibition of Graphics and Sculpture
- 2012 Art workshop "ART cafe". Yerevan, Armenia
- 2011 Yerevan Municipality, Yerevan, Armenia
- 2010 Exhibition Hall "Hay Art", Yerevan, Armenia
- 2009 "The House of Moscow", Yerevan, Armenia
- 2008 Arev Art Srah/ Hall, Yerevan, Armenia
- 2007 "Museum of Contemporary Art" International Arts Festival, Yerevan, Armenia
- 2007 Art Gallery "Stephanie's", La Canada, US,
- 2006 Nante Cultural Center, France
- 2005 Artists Union of Armenia, "To the Women's Day"
- 2004 International Club Berlin, Armenian Embassy, Germany
- 2003 Artists Union of Armenia, “Republican Exhibition of Graphics”
- 2002 Art Gallery of the Culture Center of the City Hall of Athens, Greece
- 2002 Art Gallery of Artists, Marseille, France
- 2001 Art Gallery "Green Art", Dubai, United Arab Emirates
- 2000 Art Gallery "Al Fayrouz", Manama, Bahrain
- 2000 Union of Jewelers of Armenia. Exhibition dedicated to the 10th anniversary of the Union of Designers
- 1999 Exhibition Hall "Cite International des Arts", Paris, France
- 1998 Artists Union of Armenia, “Group Exhibition of Young Armenian Artists”
- 1998 Hovnanian School, New Jersey, US
- 1998 National Art Gallery of Armenia
- 1998 Artists Union of Armenia
- 1998 Embassy of Armenia, Los Angeles, Washington, New York, US
- 1997 Embassy of Armenia, Montreal, Ottawa, Toronto, Canada
- 1997 Artists Union of Armenia, “Group Exhibition of Young Armenian Artists”
- 1997 Hovhannes Tumanyan Museum, Yerevan, Armenia
- 1996 Yerevan State University
- 1995 Yervand Kochar Museum, “Graphic Arts Exhibition”, Yerevan, Armenia
- 1995 Artists Union of Armenia

== Collections ==
Hripsime Margaryan's artworks can be found at the Karen Demirchyan Complex, Yerevan, Armenia.

== Awards ==
- 2007 - First Prize, Mysic Contest of the Ministry of Culture, Armenia.
- 2001 - Best graffiti work, Republic Exhibition, Artists Union of Armenia.
