= Kakavadzor =

Kakavadzor or Kaqavadzor may refer to:

- Kakavadzor, Aragatsotn, Armenia
- Kakavadzor, Kotayk, Armenia
- Kuropatkino, Azerbaijan
