= Kakavadzor, Kotayk =

Kakavadzor Կաքավաձոր
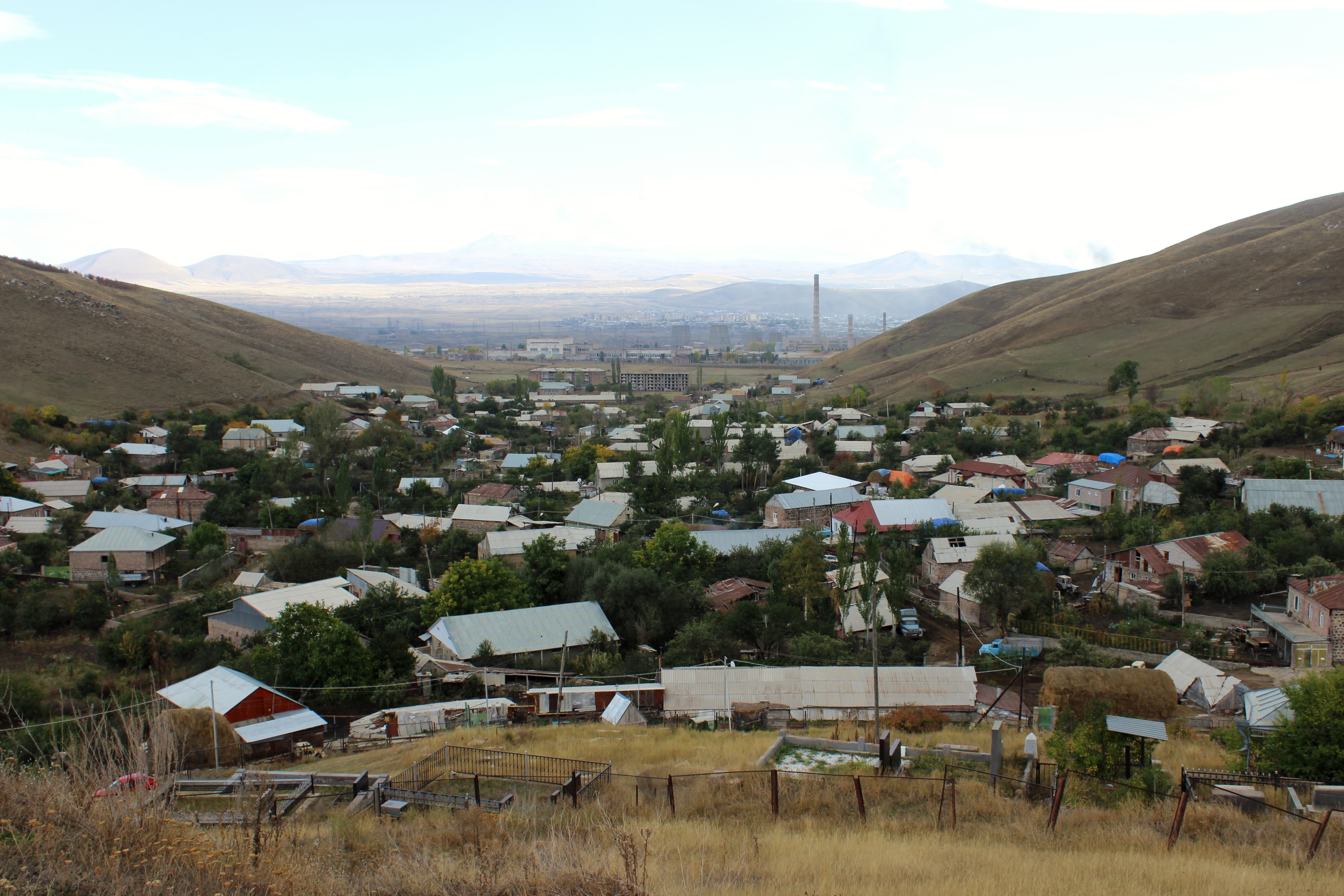
- Kakavadzor as seen from the hilltop cemetery.

- Location within Armenia
- Coordinates: 40°35′04″N 44°45′12″E
- Country: Armenia
- Marz (Provyytfince): Kotayk
- Time zone: UTC+4 ( )
  - Summer (DST): UTC+5 ( )

Kakavadzor (Armenian: Կաքավաձոր; also Romanized as Kak’avadzor and Kaqavadzor; also known locally as, Farukh) is a village in the Kotayk Province of Armenia. There are the ruins of S. Astvatsatsin, the chapel of Verin Vank (Upper Monastery) located north of the village, and a chapel in the cemetery (northwest) upon the hill. According to locals, there are supposedly other churches nearby, and possibly a monastery in the gorge northwest of the village.

Kakavadzor is served by local public transportation that brings residents to nearby Hrazdan only four times a day since roads are in poor condition. Air pollution from the MIKA Cement factory in Hrazdan has been a continuing problem for residents.

== Education and culture ==
A single school serves Kakavadzor. Teachers are brought in from neighboring villages and Hrazdan since there are not enough qualified teachers found locally to fill the positions.

== Gallery ==
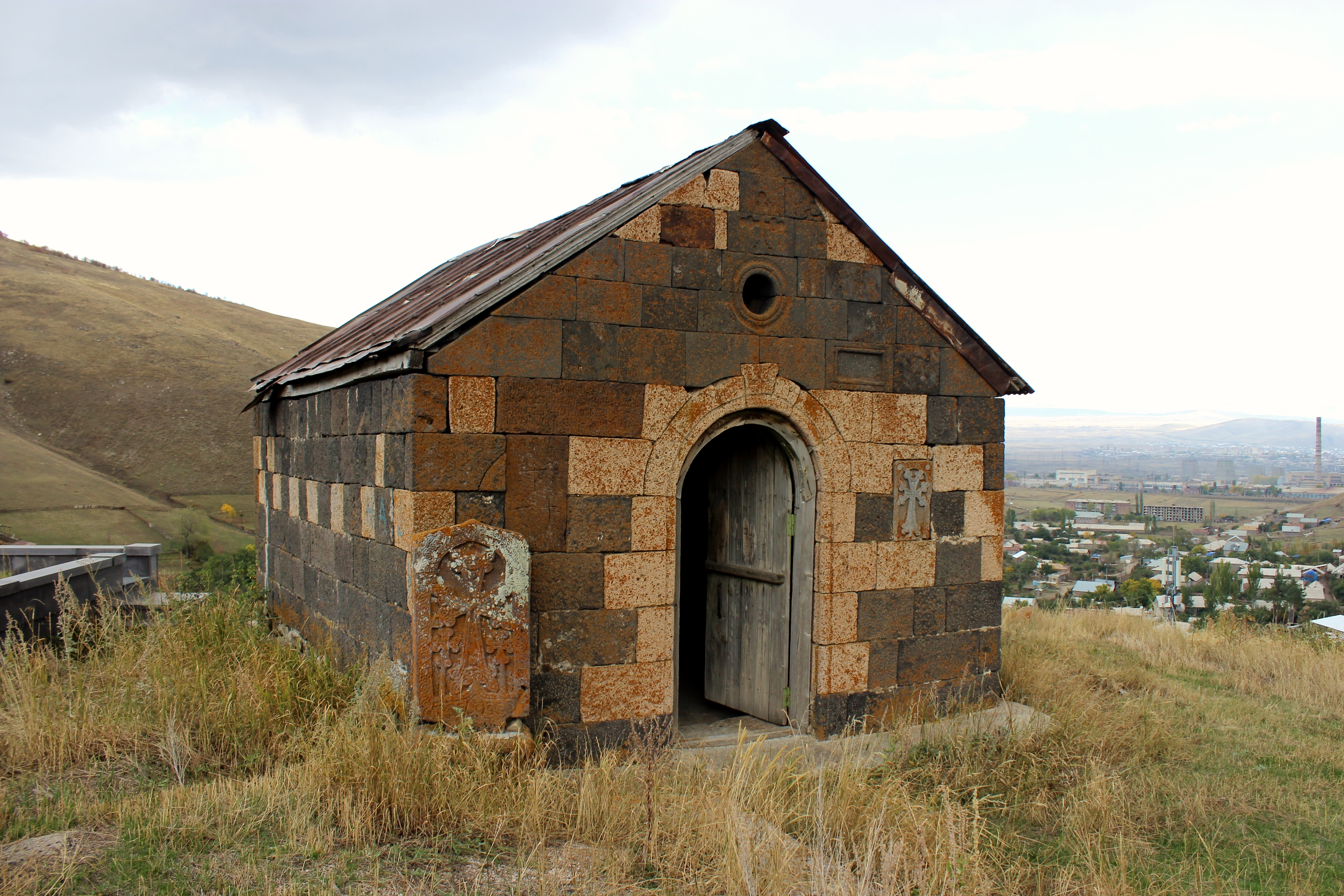
Chapel upon the hilltop cemetery.

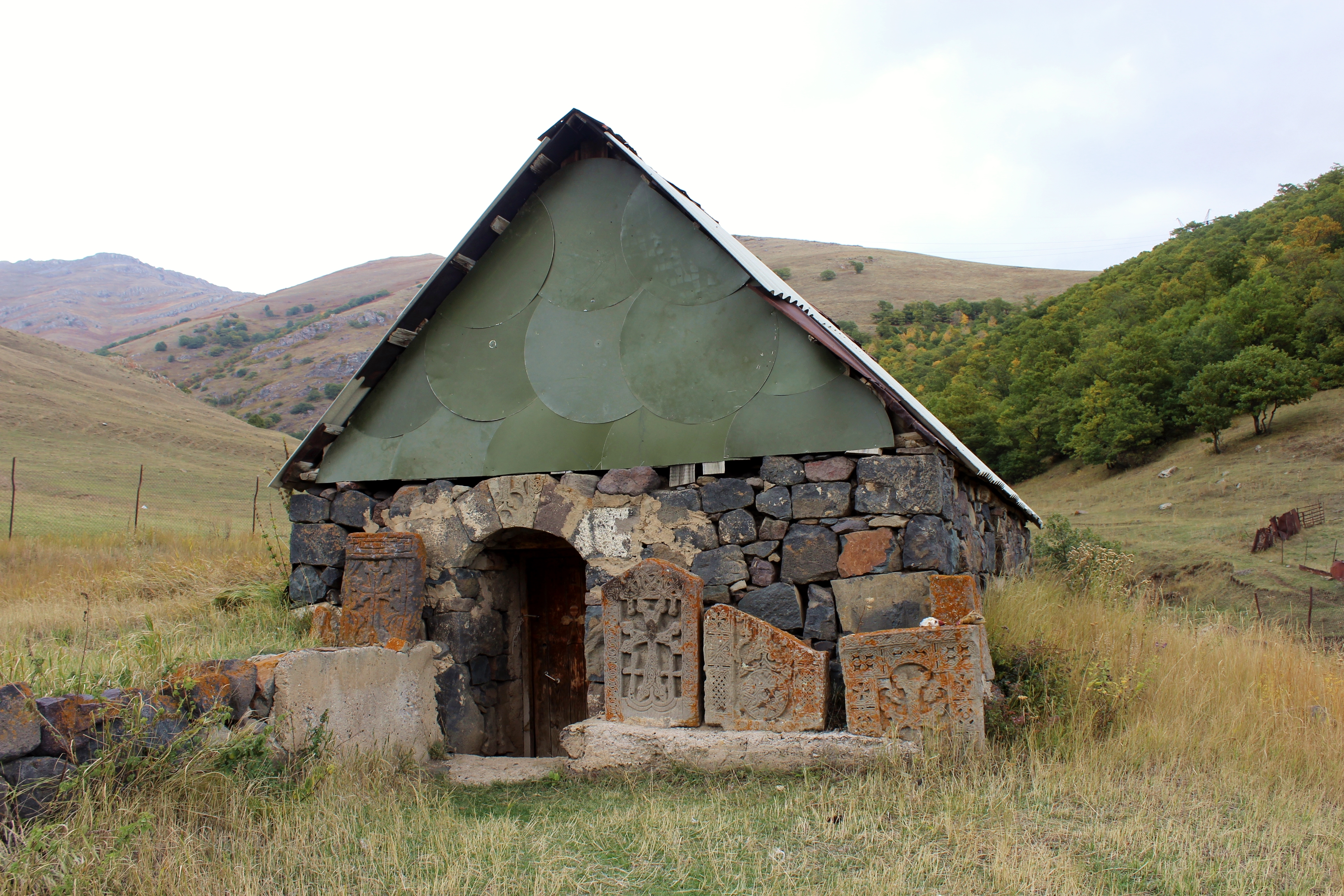
Verin Vank (Upper Monastery)

== See also ==
- Kotayk Province
