= Hrazdan =

City in Kotayk, Armenia

Hrazdan Հրազդան
- Town
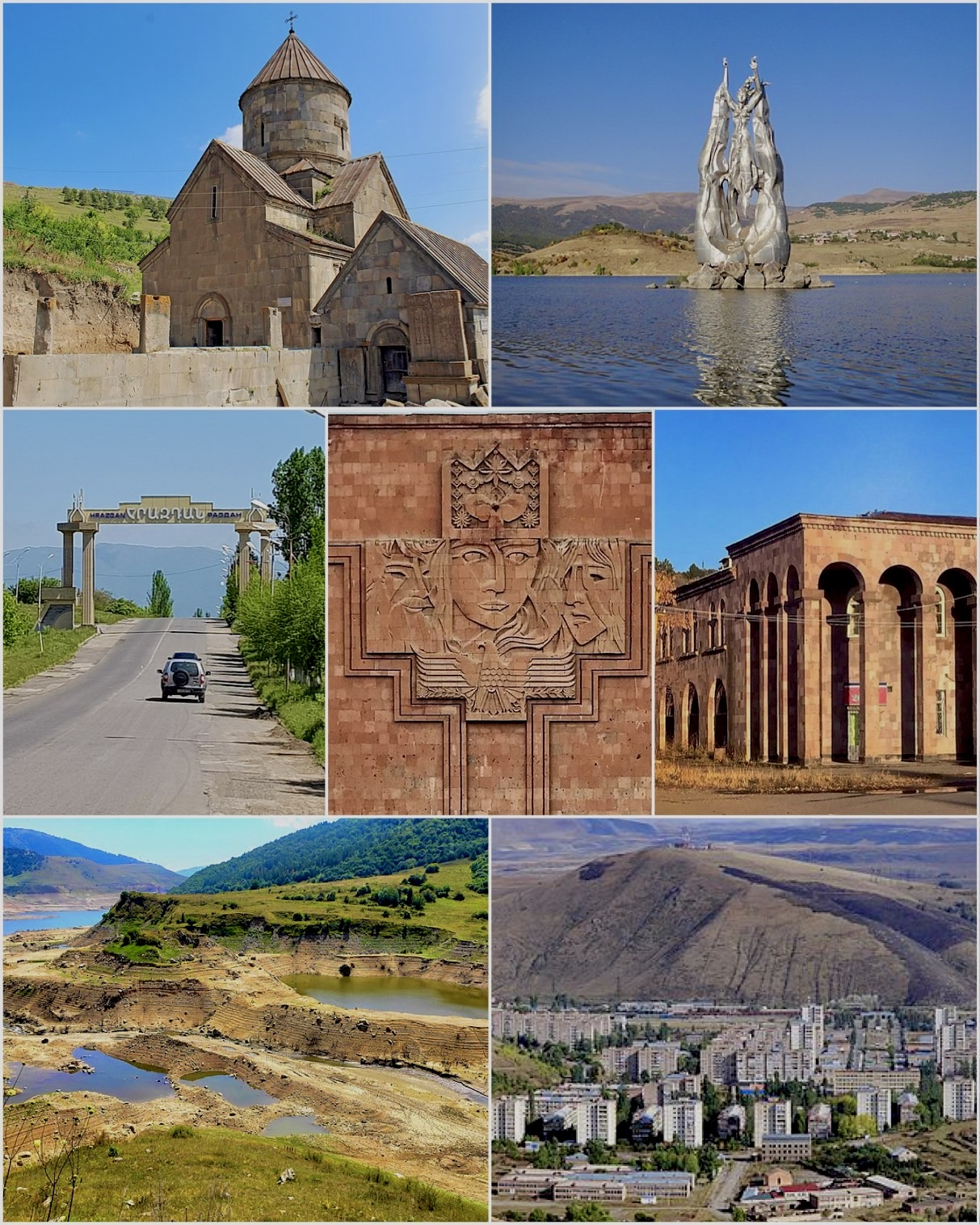
- From top left: Makravank Monastery • Tsovinar monument on Aghbyurak Reservoir • Entrance monument Palace of Culture • Music school Marmarik Reservoir • Hrazdan skyline

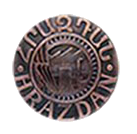
- Coat of arms

- Location within Armenia
- Coordinates: 40°30′0″N 44°46′0″E
- Country: Armenia
- Province: Kotayk
- Founded: 1959

Government
  - Mayor: Sevak Miqayelyan

Area
  - Total: 20 km^{2} (7.7 sq mi)
- Elevation: 1,675 m (5,495 ft)

Population (2022 census)
  - Total: 44,231
  - Density: 2,200/km^{2} (5,700/sq mi)
- Time zone: UTC+4 (AMT)
- Postal code: 2301-2309
- Area code: (+374) 223
- Website: www.hrazdan.am

Hrazdan (Armenian: Հրազդան [həɾɑzˈdɑn]) is a town and urban municipal community in Armenia serving as the administrative centre of Kotayk Province, located 45 kilometres (28 miles) northeast of the capital Yerevan. As of the 2011 census, the population of the town is 44,231.

During the Soviet period, Hrazdan was one of the industrialized centres of the Armenian SSR.

The prelacy of the Diocese of Kotayk of the Armenian Apostolic Church is headquartered in Hrazdan.

== Etymology ==
The town is named after the Hrazdan River, which flows through the town from north to south. The name Hrazdan itself is derived from the Middle-Persian name Frazdān, which is related to the Zoroastrian mythology. Frazdān is the name of the lake mentioned in the Avesta while referring to Goshtasb's war with two of its enemies. Armenians were predominantly Zoroastrian before embracing Christianity, and Zoroastrian names were maintained in the geography of Armenia.

== History ==
=== Ancient history and Middle Ages ===
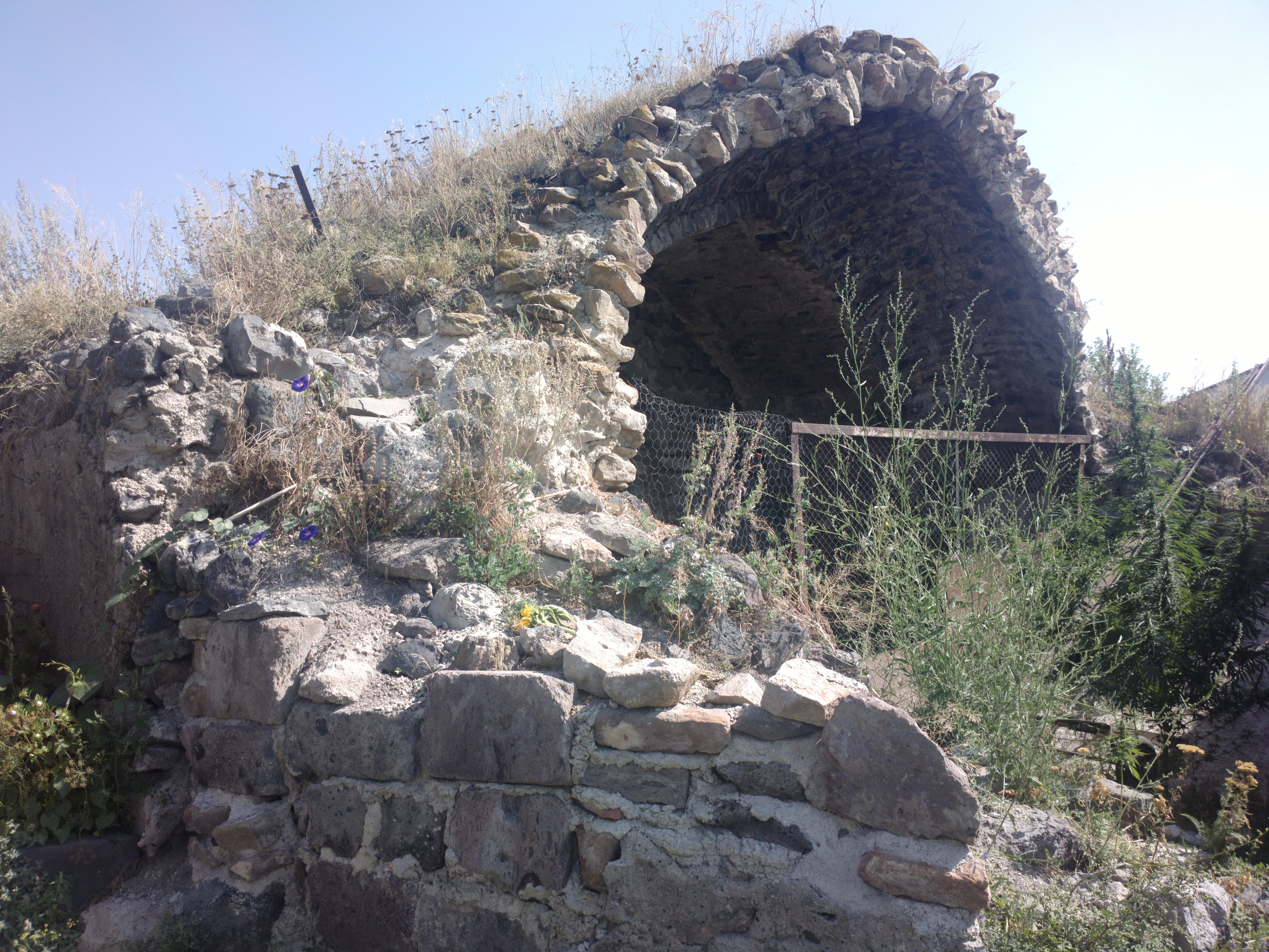
Hrazdan Caravanserai, built in the 13th century

Historically, the territory of Hrazdan is associated with the historic Kotayk canton of the Ayrarat province of Ancient Armenia. According to Ptolemy, Kotayk was directly ruled by the Arsacid kings of Armenia during the first and second centuries AD. Between the fifth and seventh centuries, the region was granted to the Kamsarakan and Amatuni families, under the Persian rule. Between the seventh and ninth centuries, Armenia was under an Arab Islamic occupation.

By the end of the 9th century, the region became part of the newly established Bagratid Kingdom of Armenia. Between the 11th and 15th centuries, the region was occupied by the Seljuk, Mongol, Ag Qoyunlu and Kara Koyunlu governments, respectively.

=== 16th to 19th centuries ===
At the beginning of the 16th century, the territory became part of the Erivan Beglarbegi within the Safavid Persia. During the first half of the 18th century, the territory became part of the Erivan Khanate under the rule of the Afsharid dynasty and later under the Qajar dynasty of Persia. It remained under Persian rule until 1827 or 1828, when Eastern Armenia was ceded to the Russian Empire as a result of the Russo-Persian War of 1826–28 and the signing of the Treaty of Turkmenchay.

=== 20th century and beyond ===
With the fall of the Russian Empire and as a result of the Armenian victory over the Turks in the battles of Sardarabad, Abaran, and Gharakilisa, the region became part of the independent Armenia in May 1918. After two years of independence, Armenia became part of the Soviet Union in December 1920.

Hrazdan is among the towns that were founded and developed during the Soviet rule. The former village of Akhta (or Nerkin Akhta), which covered the southern parts of present-day Hrazdan, was the centre of the Akhta raion, an administrative territory of the Armenian SSR formed in 1930. In 1959, The village of Akhta was incorporated into an urban-type settlement known as Hrazdan. Akta raion was also renamed as Hrazdan raion.

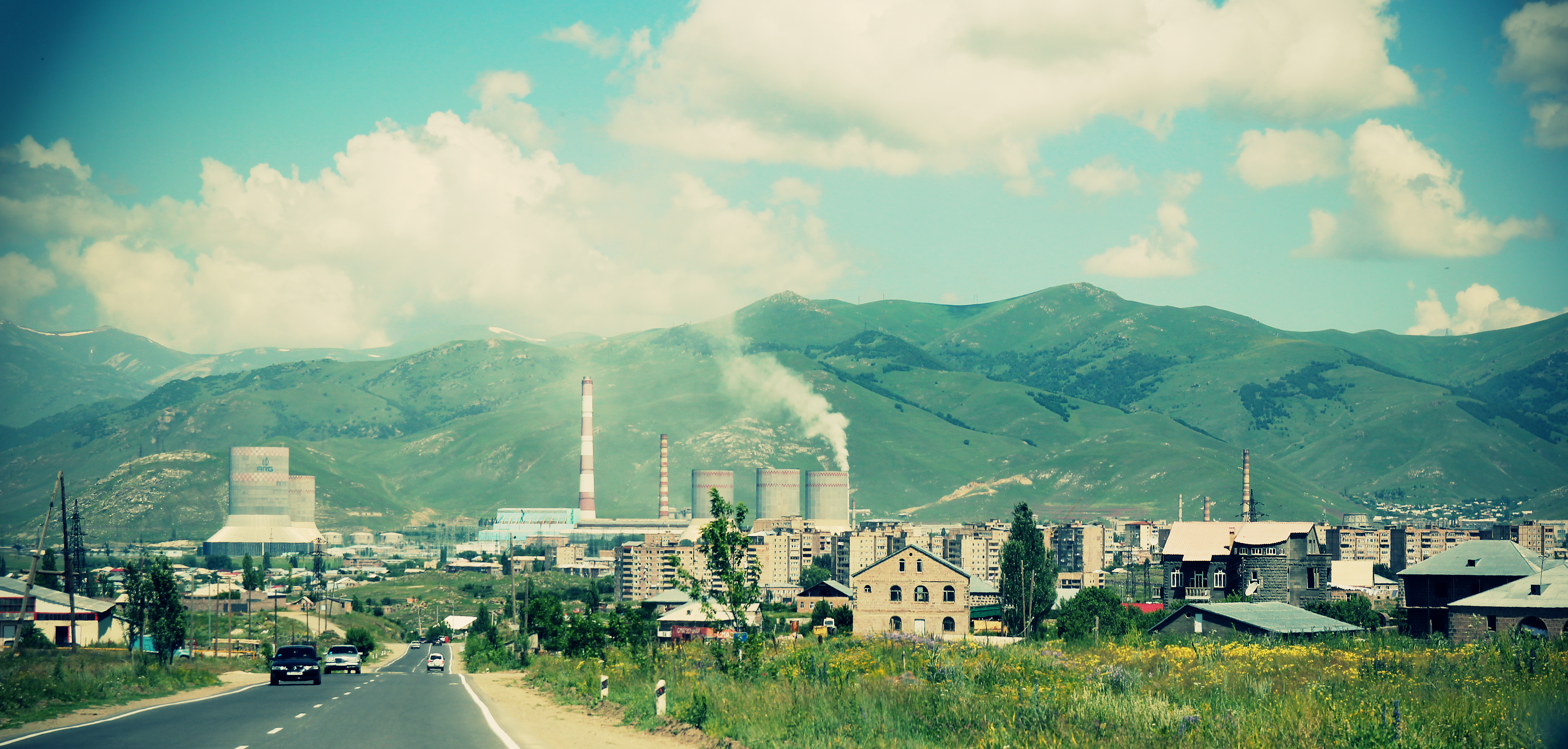
General view of Hrazdan

The original urban development plan of Hrazdan was introduced between 1961 and 1963 by architects M. Grigoryan and E. Altunyan. Upon the January 12, 1963 decision of the Supreme Soviet of the Armenian SSR on the territorial changes in the state, the villages of Vanatur, Jrarat, Kakavadzor and Makravan were merged within Hrazdan to become a town of republican subordination.

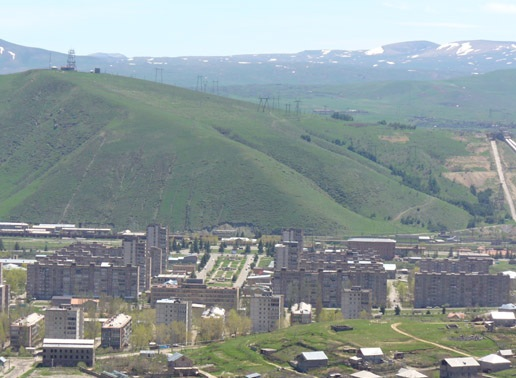
The central Kentron district

Hrazdan went through development during the 1960s and 1970s when large industrial plants were opened by the Soviet government, including the "HrazdanMash" machine tool plant, a cement factory, a Jrarat milk factory, and a prefabricated concrete panel plant. Another urban development plan was introduced between 1978 and 1980; it was envisaged to accommodate 120,000 residents in Hrazdan by the end of 2010. However, the plan was eventually abandoned with the dissolution of the Soviet Union.

Modern-day Hrazdan is divided into three major parts:

- The Northern part, which includes the districts of Jrarat and Mikroshrjan, as well as the Hrazdan industrial district.
- The Central part, which includes the districts of Kochor, Vanatur, Kentron, and Makravan.
- The Southern part, which includes the districts of Spandaryan and Aghbyurak, along with the Hrazdan reservoir.

In December 1995, Hrazdan became the centre of the newly formed Kotayk Province.

== Geography and climate ==
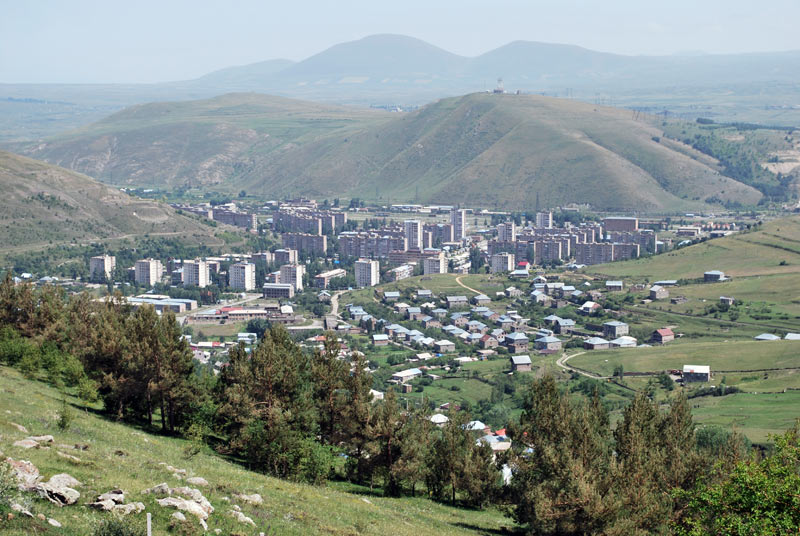
General view of Hrazdan

The town of Hrazdan is located in the northeastern part of Armenia, within the Kotayk Province. It is bordered by the Pambak mountain range from the north and the Tsaghkunyats Mountains from the southwest. The borders of the town extend east across the Geghama mountains, reaching up to the top of Mount Gutanasar. While passing through the town, the Hrazdan River reaches its tributaries, the Marmarik and Aghveran rivers.

Hrazdan has an average elevation of 1,675 meters above sea level. The town has a warm-summer humid continental climate (Köppen climate classification Dfb).The average temperature is 6 °C (ranging from -7 °C in January to 18.1 °C in August). The annual precipitation is around 700 mm.

Climate data for Hrazdan
Month	Jan	Feb	Mar	Apr	May	Jun	Jul	Aug	Sep	Oct	Nov	Dec	Year
Record high °C (°F)	8.0 (46.4)	12.0 (53.6)	20.0 (68.0)	26.1 (79.0)	29.0 (84.2)	31.0 (87.8)	35.0 (95.0)	35.0 (95.0)	33.0 (91.4)	25.9 (78.6)	20.0 (68.0)	15.1 (59.2)	35.0 (95.0)
Daily mean °C (°F)	−6.9 (19.6)	−5.1 (22.8)	0.3 (32.5)	5.8 (42.4)	10.6 (51.1)	15.1 (59.2)	18.1 (64.6)	18.1 (64.6)	14.1 (57.4)	8.2 (46.8)	1.1 (34.0)	−4.5 (23.9)	6.2 (43.2)
Record low °C (°F)	−26.0 (−14.8)	−28.1 (−18.6)	−25.6 (−14.1)	−17.5 (0.5)	−5.3 (22.5)	0.0 (32.0)	2.5 (36.5)	2.6 (36.7)	−3.0 (26.6)	−9.0 (15.8)	−20.0 (−4.0)	−27.2 (−17.0)	−28.1 (−18.6)
Average precipitation mm (inches)	47.1 (1.85)	57.6 (2.27)	73.1 (2.88)	96.7 (3.81)	95.4 (3.76)	61.3 (2.41)	49.7 (1.96)	29.4 (1.16)	32.7 (1.29)	57.8 (2.28)	49.2 (1.94)	48.6 (1.91)	698.6 (27.52)
Average precipitation days (≥ 1.0 mm)	7.9	8.4	9.5	13	14.3	9.3	6.6	5.5	4.7	7.6	6.6	7.4	100.8
Source: NOAA

== Demographics ==
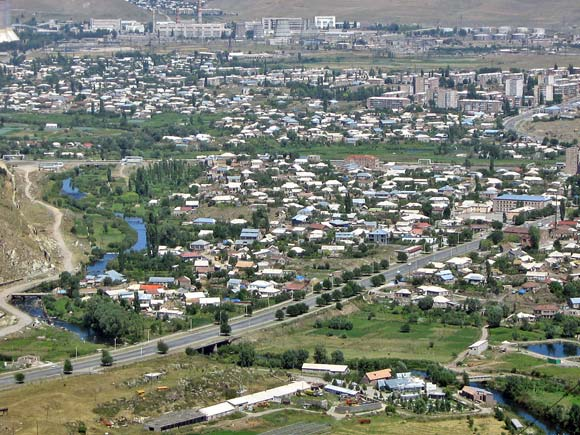
Andranik Avenue at the Vanatur district

Historical population
Year	Pop.	±% p.a.
1959	7,630	—
1976	35,137	+9.40%
1989	25,903	−2.32%
1991	25,600	−0.59%
2001	52,808	+7.51%
2011	41,875	−2.29%
2022	44,231	+0.50%
2024	46,616	+2.66%

=== Religion ===
The residents of Hrazdan are mainly Christians who belong to the Armenian Apostolic Church. The church is regulated by the Diocese of Kotayk.

Present-day Hrazdan has churches dating back to the Middle Ages as well as modern periods. The remains of the Surp Stepanos (transl. Saint Stephen) Monastic Complex of Aghbyurak date back to the 10th and 12th centuries. As of 2016, the town is home to the following churches:

- Makravank Monastery, consisting of 2 churches: the Holy Saviour's church of the 10th century and the Holy Mother of God church of the 13th century
- Holy Cross Church of Kochor (originally built in 1854-61, rebuilt in 2013)
- Holy Mother of God Church of Vanatur (opened in 1883)
- Blue Cross Chapel of Vanatur (built in 1993-96)
- Tukh Manuk Church (opened in 2003)
- Saint George's Church (opened in 2013)

Hrazdan also has ruins of churches and monasteries dating back to the medieval period; they are protected by the government of Armenia.

- Kakavadzor Upper Chapel, Hrazdan (4-7th centuries)
- Surp Stepanos Church of Aghbyurak (10-12th centuries)
- Holy Right Monastery (10-14th centuries)
- Kakavadzor Chapel, Hrazdan (18-19th centuries)
- Surp Karapet Church of Jrarat (1831)

== Culture ==
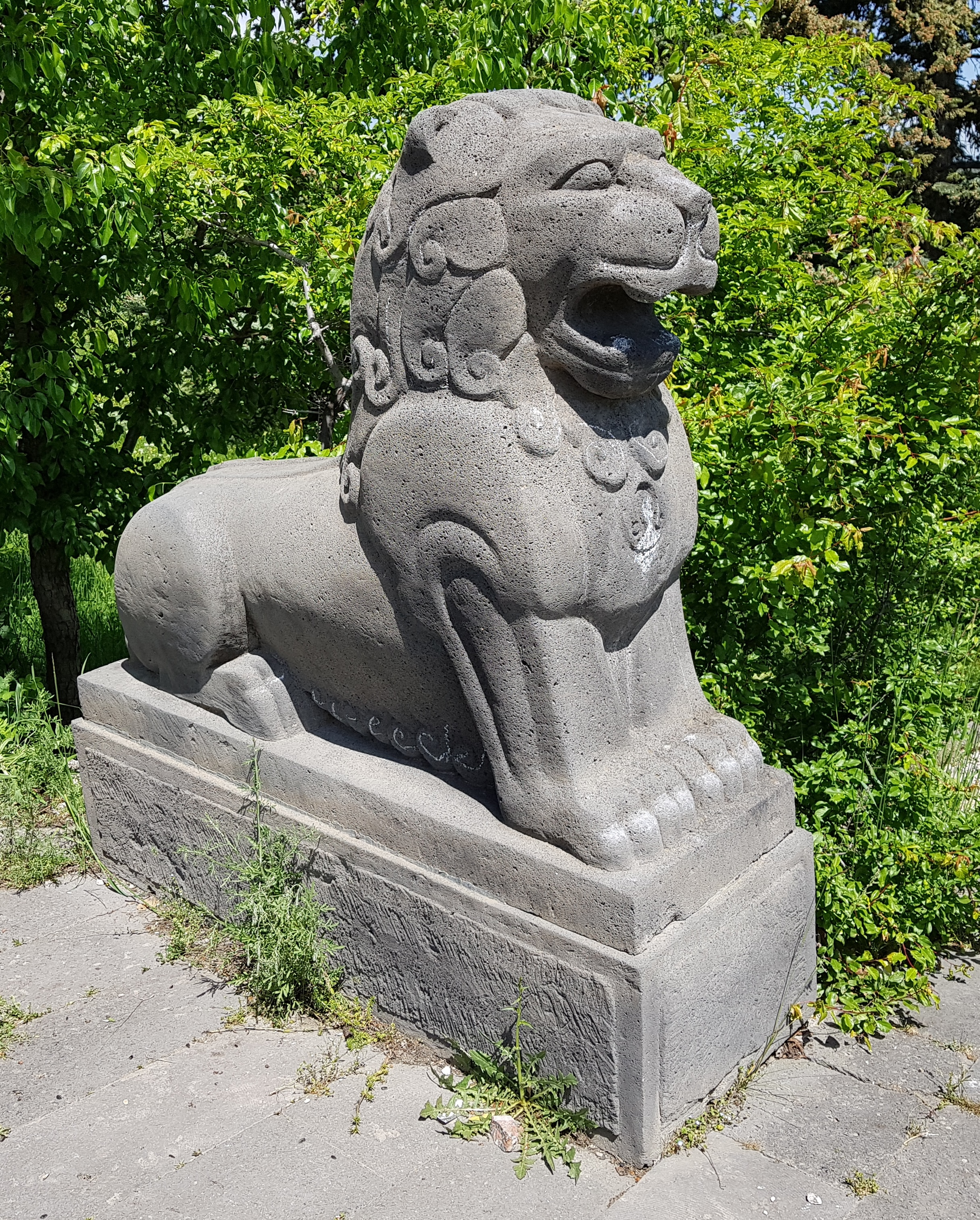
Lion statue in Hrazdan

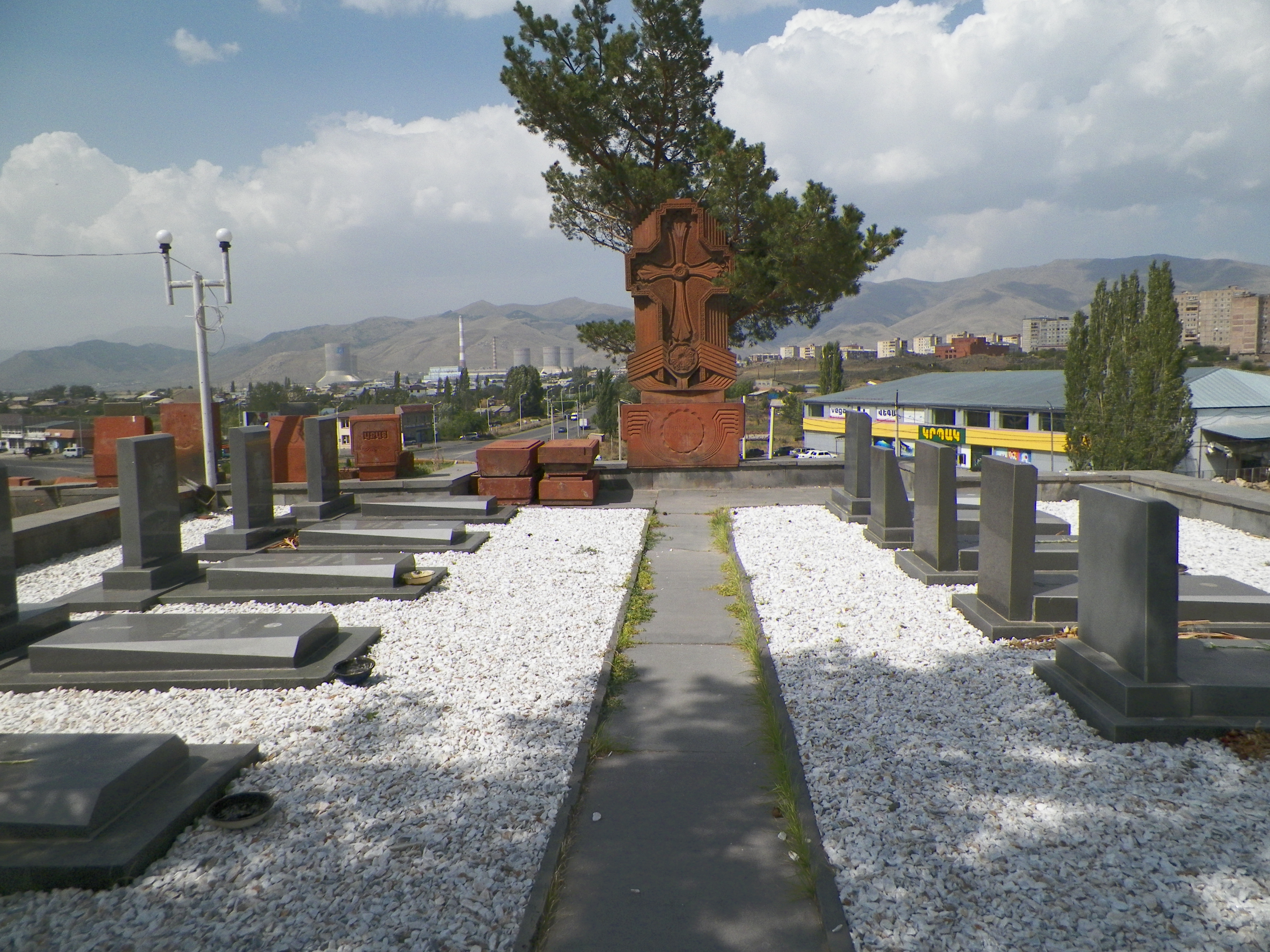
Cemetery of Artsakh war soldiers from Hrazdan

The Hrazdan Drama Theatre was founded in 1953. The Hrazdan branch of the National Gallery of Armenia and the Geological Museum of Hrazdan are also among the prominent cultural institutions in the town. The History Museum in Hrazdan, which was founded by Armen Aivazyan, features more than 4,000 historical pieces.

=== Media ===
Hrazdan TV is a private TV company in Hrazdan, founded by the family of Harutyunyan. The family also publishes a private newspaper and runs a radio company known as Hrazdan Radio. The number of the Hrazdan TV viewers is around 220,000. The company started broadcasting its programmes on 1 September 1991, covering the Kotayk Province and some parts of the Gegharkunik Province.

== Transportation ==
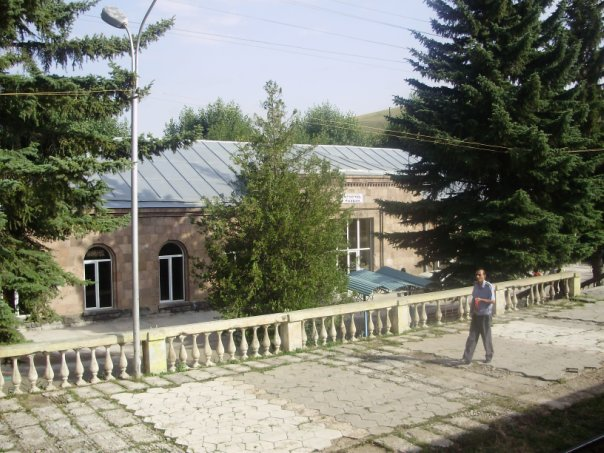
Hrazdan Railway Station

Hrazdan is a transport junction between Armenia's capital, Yerevan, and its northern provinces. The M-4 Motorway that connects Yerevan with northern Armenia passes through the southwestern edge of the town. As a provincial centre, Hrazdan is connected with the rest of Kotayk through a well-developed network of roads.

The town is also an important railroad station on the South Caucasus Railway (Yerevan to Shorzha and Yerevan to Dilijan lines).

== Economy ==
Hrazdan is one of the highly industrialized towns in Armenia. The town is home to large plants including:

- The Hrazdan hydroelectric power plant, which was built between 1954 and 1959 in the Aghbyurak district of Hrazdan, as part of the Sevan–Hrazdan Cascade. It has two turbines with a total installed capacity of 81.6 MW. Its nominal annual generation is 375 GWh, but the factual generation for the last years has been about 40 GWh. The water reservoir has an area of 1.7 km^{2}_{,} with a capacity of 5.6 million m^{3}.

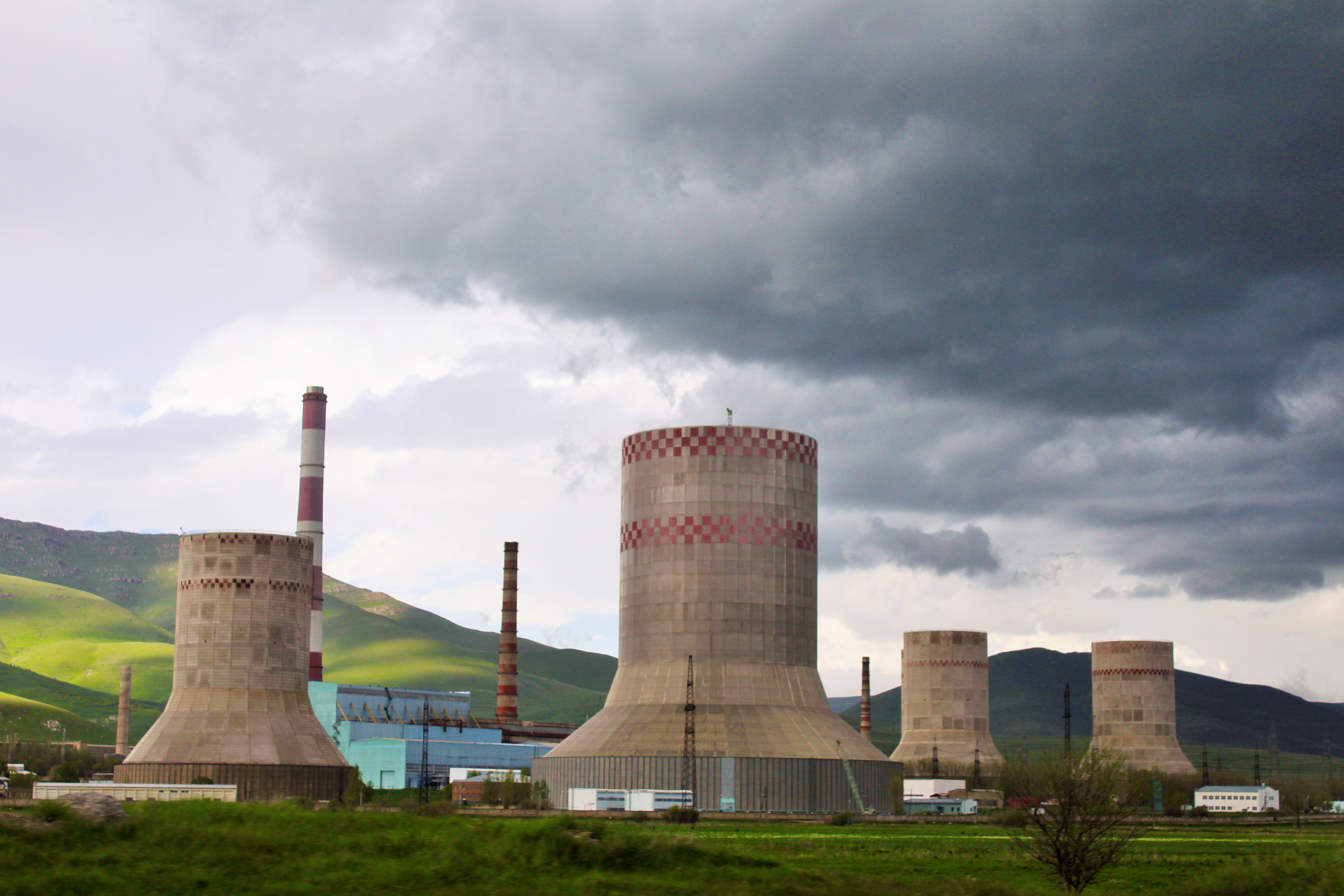
Hrazdan Thermal Power Plant

- The Hrazdan Thermal Power Plant (RazTES OJSC), which is one of the largest thermal power plants in Transcaucasia. It was built in 1963–1974, and the first unit became operational in 1966. In 2013, a new unit was added. Four older units of the plant are owned and operated by the Hrazdan Energy Company, a subsidiary of Inter RAO UES, while the new 5th unit is owned and operated by Gazprom Armenia. In 2015, Inter RAO UES sold the Hrazdan Energy Company to the Cyprus-registered Liormand Holdings Ltd., a part of the Tashir Group owned by Samvel Karapetyan. The plant has a total power of 1,110 MW (units 1-4) and 480 MW for the added 5th unit.
- The Hrazdan Cement factory of Hrazdan, which was founded in 1970 as "Hrazdan Cement Factory" by the Soviet government. It was privatized in 2001 to become owned by "MIKA Ltd.". In July 2014, a new group of owners took over the factory led by Nikolay Khachaturov of Khachaturov Group. Since then, the plant has undergone major changes by improving the production technology and becoming more environmentally friendly. The plant is one of the largest cement producers in Transcaucasia with an annual production capacity of 1.2 million tons and the only one in the region with wet production methodology.
- The Qualitech Machinery machine tool plant, which is an Armenian-Canadian joint venture founded in 1999.

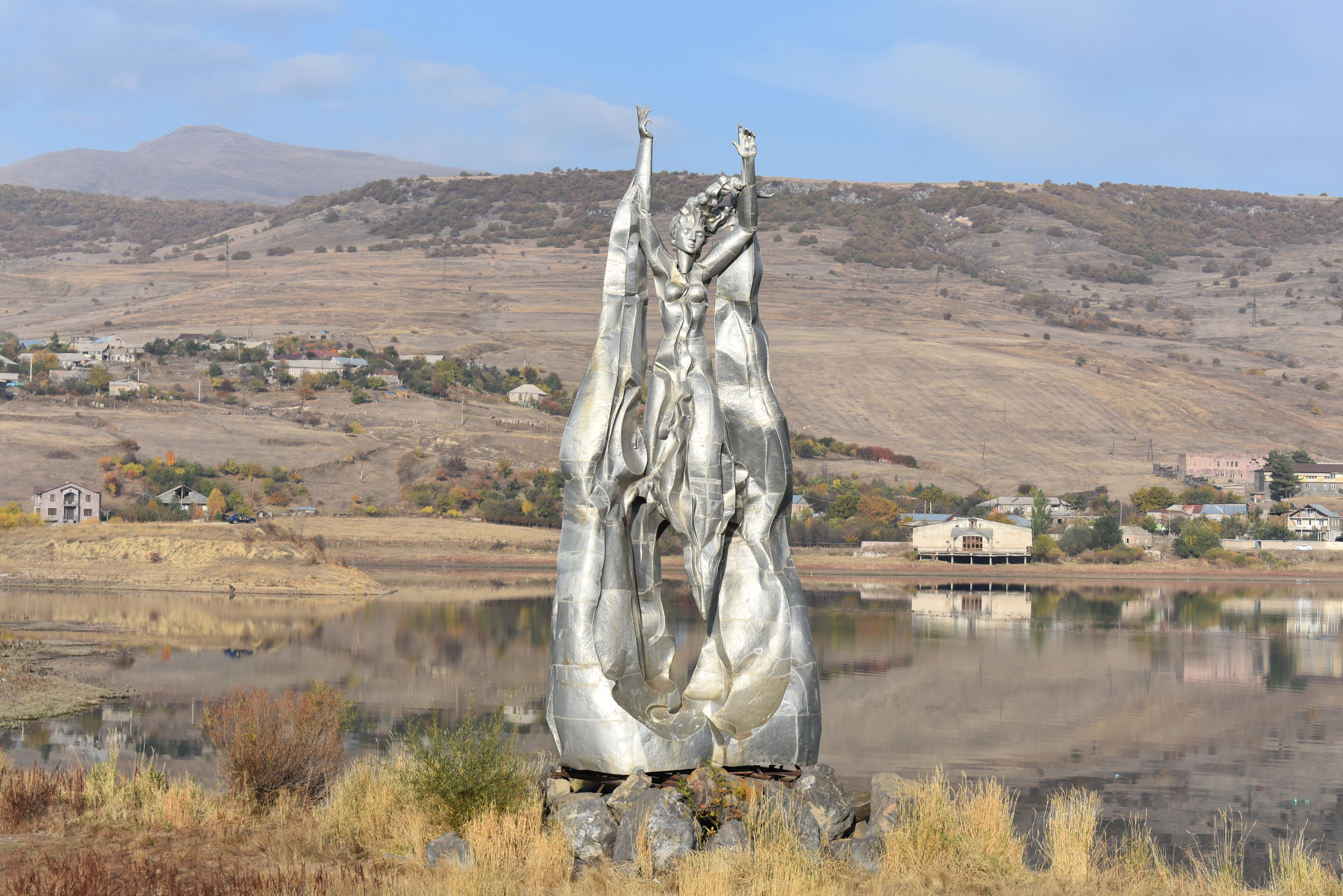
The statue of Tsovinar

The town has also minor industrial firms including the Hidro Storm metal-plastic manufacturing plant founded in 2009, as well as the Arjermek and Hakobyan companies for building materials.

== Education ==
Hrazdan is home to the Humanitarian Institute of Hrazdan, which was opened in 1996. Owned by the private sector, the university has 3 faculties: law, pedagogy and economics.

As of 2009, 13 public education schools, 13 nursery schools, one school for special needs students, and several musical and sport academies were operating in Hrazdan.

There is a research centre within the Hrazdan Zoological and Botanical Garden.

== Sport ==
Football is the most popular sport in Hrazdan. FC Shinarar was the football club that represented the town during Soviet occupation. The municipal stadium of Hrazdan was their home venue. The club was dissolved in 1992 due to financial difficulties.

Field hockey is also popular in the town. Hrazdan is home to the only field hockey venue of Armenia, with a capacity of 1,500 seats. The Hrazdan Hockey Club occasionally represents Armenia in several regional and international tournaments. The Soviet-Armenian field hockey player and 1980 Olympic bronze medalist Sos Hayrapetyan played for the club between 1988 and 1992.

== Notable people ==
- Mishik Kazaryan (1948-2020), Russian-Armenian physicist specialising in laser physics and optics
- Armen Nazaryan (1982-), Armenian judoka
- Seyran Osipov (1961-2008), Russian professional footballer of Armenian origin

== See also ==
- Hrazdan River
