= Sevan–Hrazdan Cascade =

- Locations of the Sevan–Hrazdan Cascade power plants in Armenia
- Country: Armenia
- Location: Central Armenia
- Purpose: Hydroelectricity; Irrigation
- Status: Operational
- Construction began: 1936
- Opening date: 1962
- Owner: Tashir Group
- Operator: International Energy Corporation

Power Station
- Installed capacity: 560 MW
- Annual generation: 412 GWh
- Sevan HPP
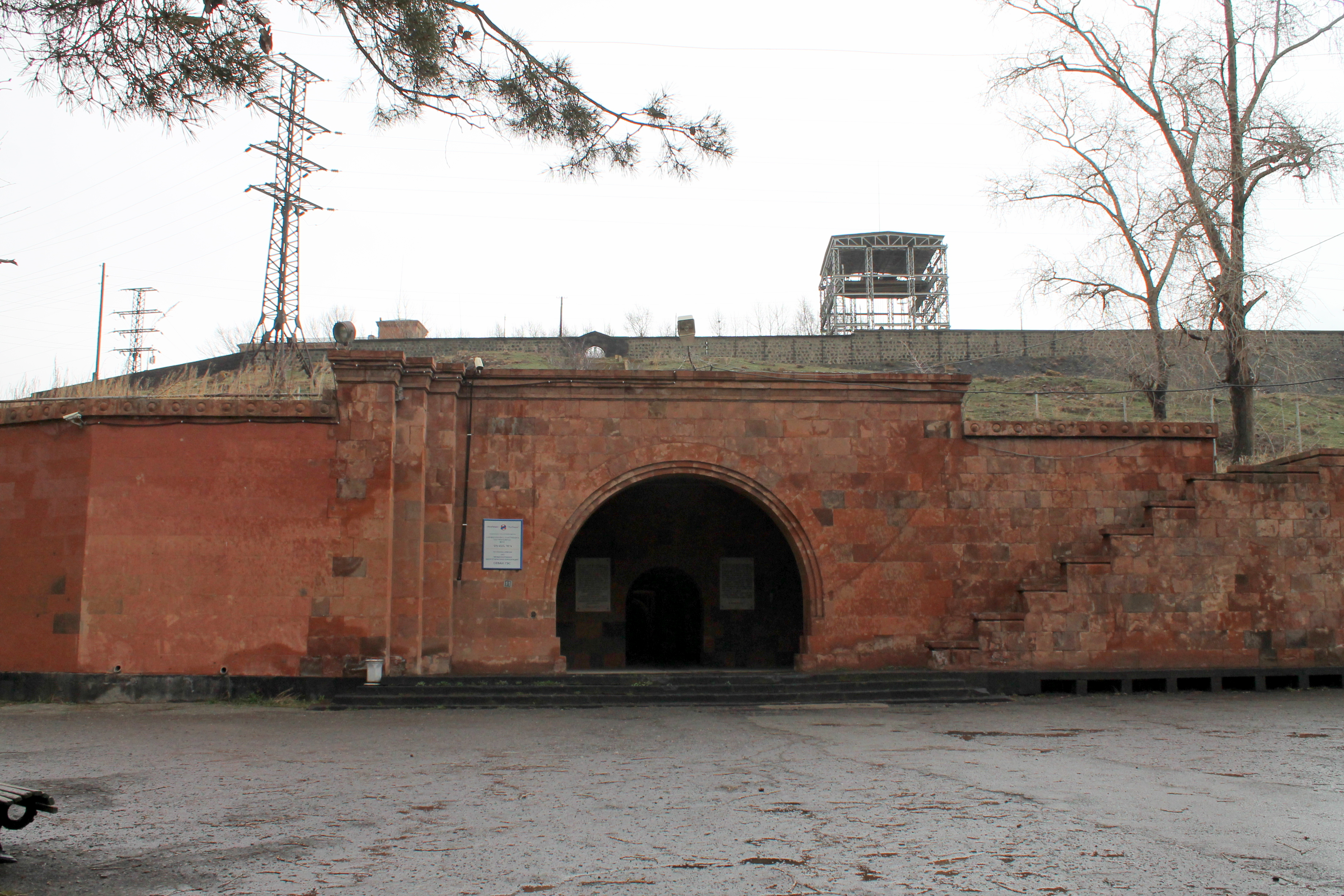
- Gate of the Sevan HPP
- Interactive map of Sevan HPP
- Coordinates: 40°33′17″N 44°57′56″E
- Status: Operational

Power Station
- Commission date: 1949
- Turbines: 2 X 17.1 MW
- Installed capacity: 34.2 MW
- Annual generation: 15 GWh
- Hrazdan HPP
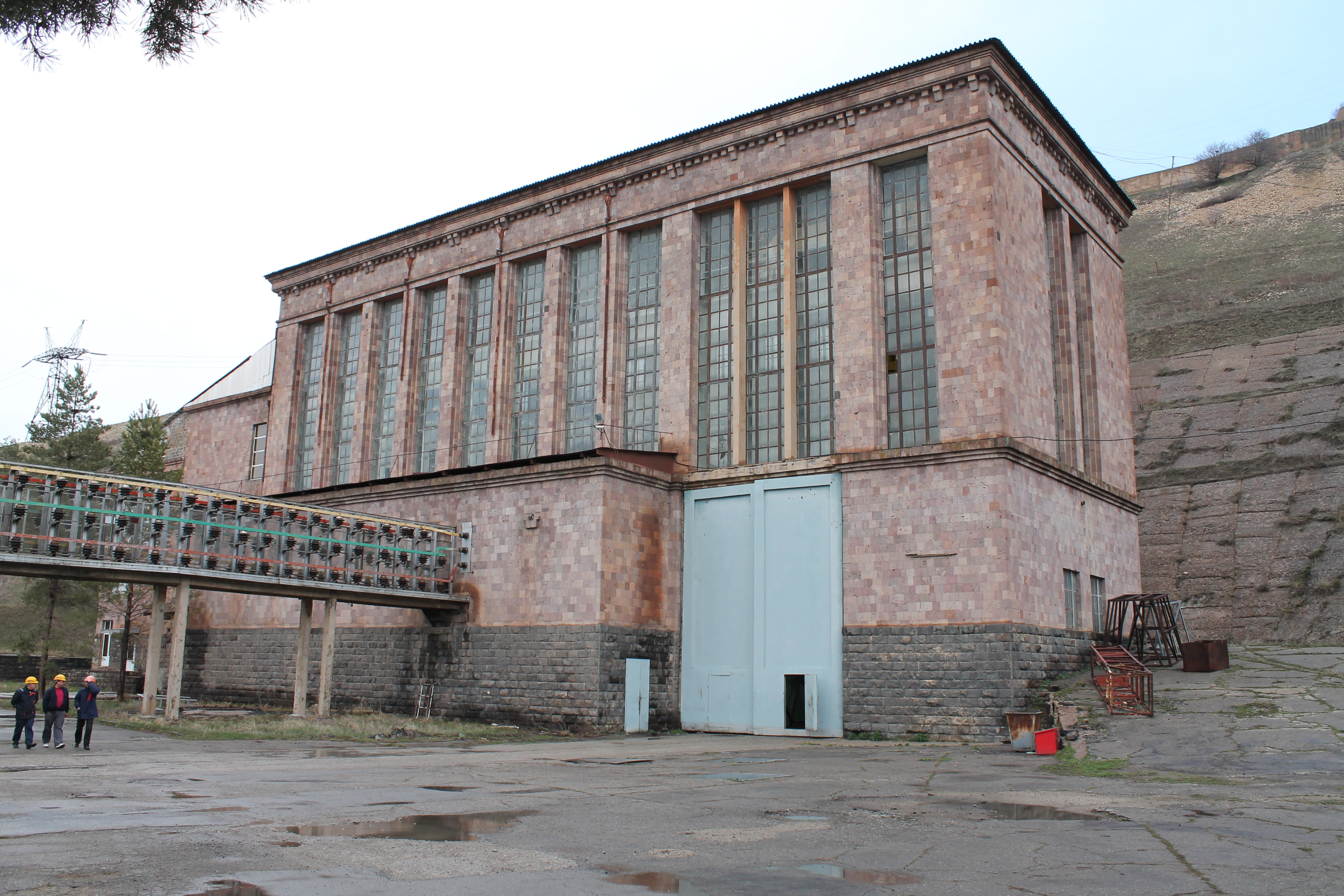
- Building of the Hrazdan HPP
- Interactive map of Hrazdan HPP
- Location: Atarbekyan
- Coordinates: 40°30′29″N 44°45′39″E
- Status: Operational

Power Station
- Commission date: 1959
- Turbines: 2 X 40.8 MW
- Installed capacity: 81.6 MW
- Annual generation: 40 GWh
- Argel HPP
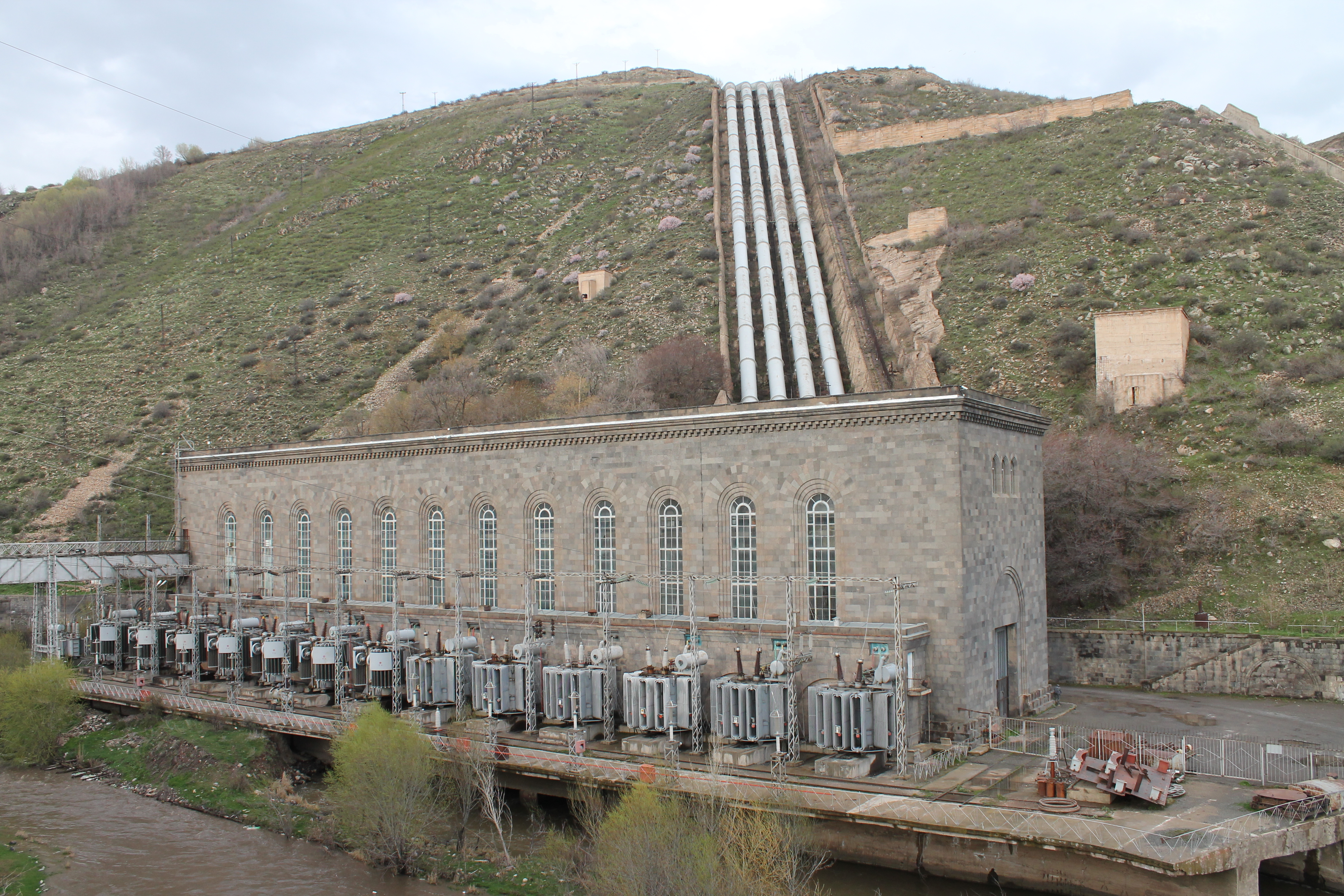
- Building of the Argel HPP
- Interactive map of Argel HPP
- Location: Argel
- Coordinates: 40°22′44″N 44°36′29″E
- Status: Operational

Reservoir
- Creates: Akhpara Reservoir
- Total capacity: 5,600,000 m^{3} (4,500 acre⋅ft)
- Active capacity: 4,100,000 m^{3} (3,300 acre⋅ft)

Power Station
- Commission date: 1953
- Turbines: 4 x 56 MW
- Installed capacity: 224 MW
- Annual generation: 200 GWh
- Arzni HPP
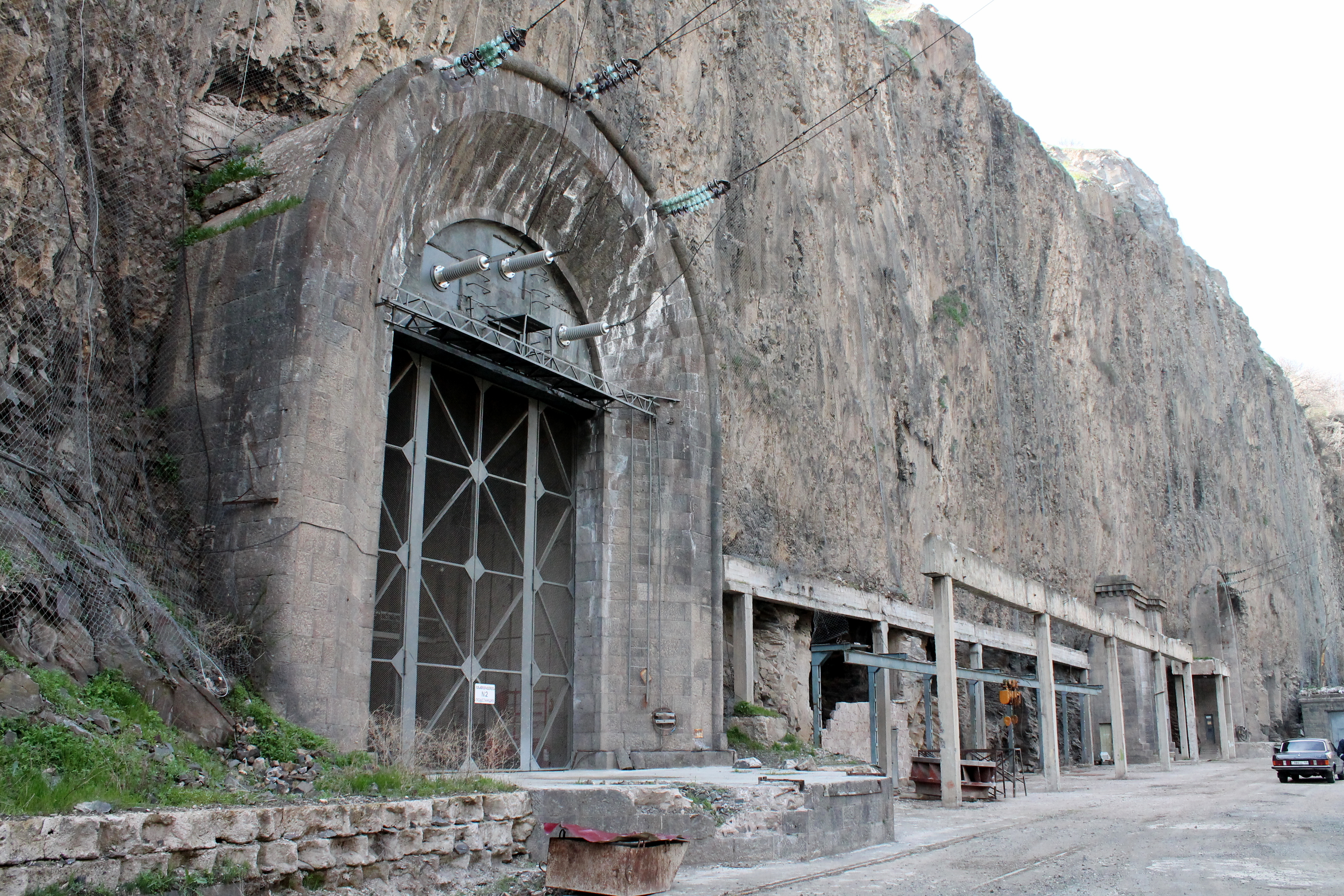
- Exit of the Arzni HPP
- Interactive map of Arzni HPP
- Location: Arzni
- Coordinates: 40°17′49″N 44°35′19″E
- Status: Operational

Power Station
- Commission date: 1956
- Turbines: 3 x 23.5 MW
- Installed capacity: 70.6 MW
- Annual generation: 80 GWh
- Kanaker HPP
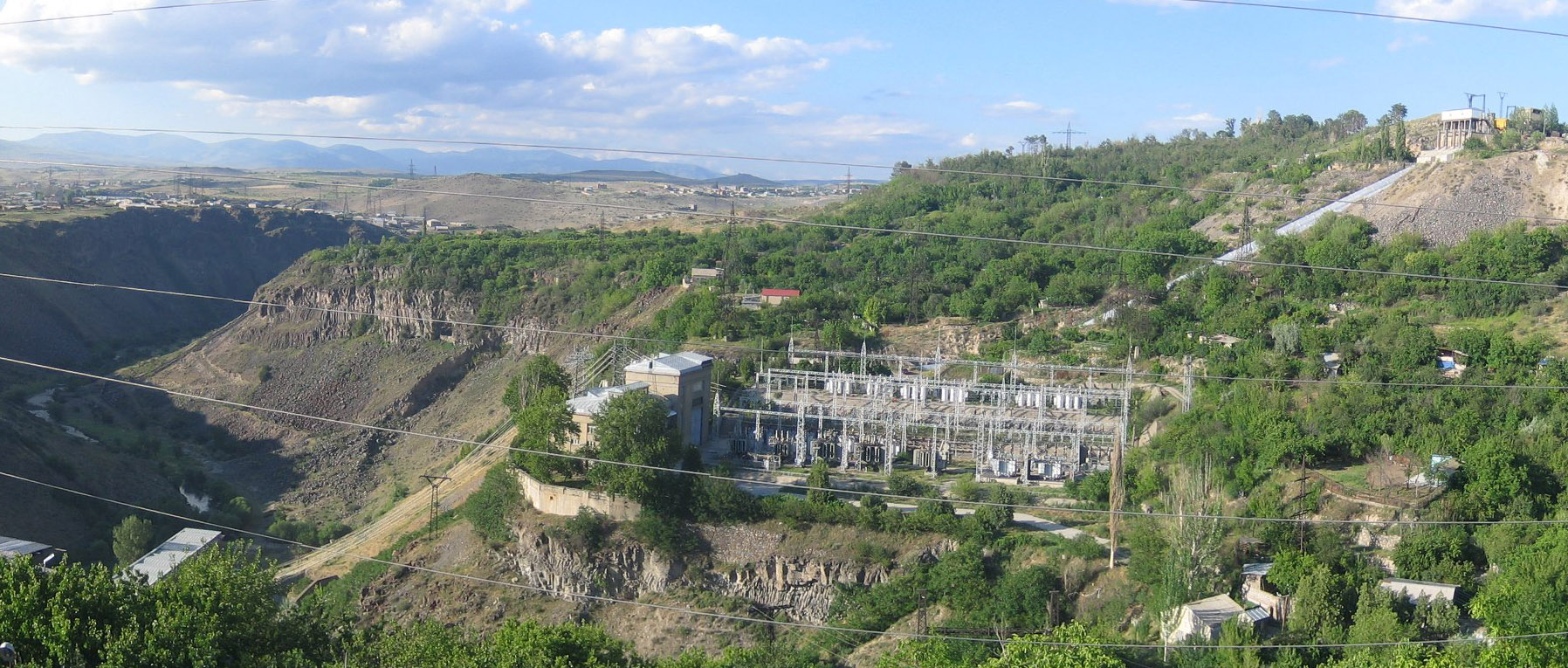
- View the Kanaker HPP
- Interactive map of Kanaker HPP
- Location: Yerevan (Kanaker)
- Coordinates: 40°13′14″N 44°31′06″E
- Status: Operational

Power Station
- Commission date: 1936
- Turbines: 2 x 12.5 MW; 2 x 25 MW
- Installed capacity: 100 MW
- Annual generation: 110 GWh
- Yerevan-1 HPP
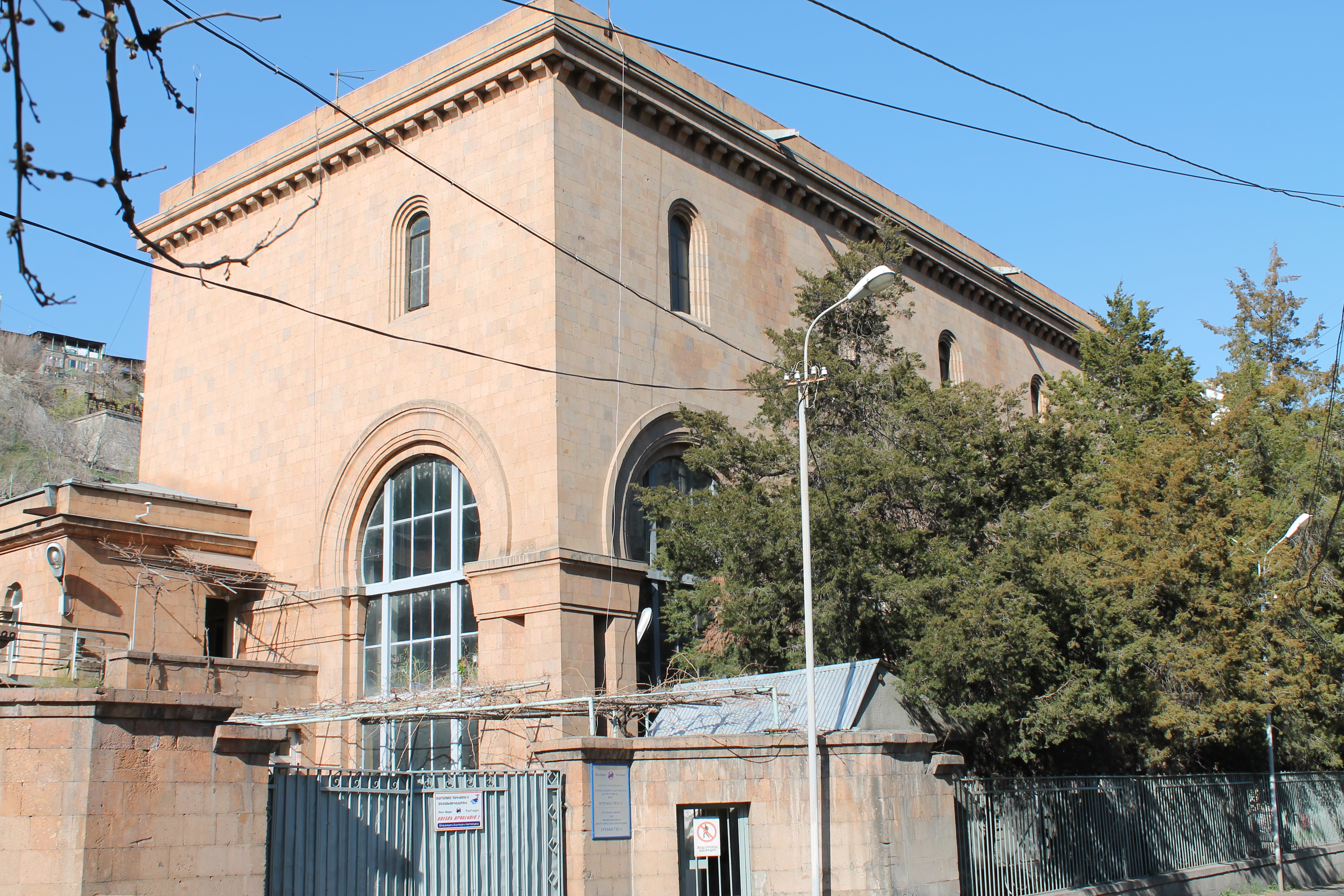
- Building of the Yerevan-1 HPP
- Interactive map of Yerevan-1 HPP
- Location: Yerevan
- Coordinates: 40°11′22″N 44°29′56″E
- Status: Operational

Power Station
- Commission date: 1962
- Turbines: 2 x 22 MW
- Installed capacity: 44 MW
- Annual generation: 50 GWh
- Yerevan-3 HPP
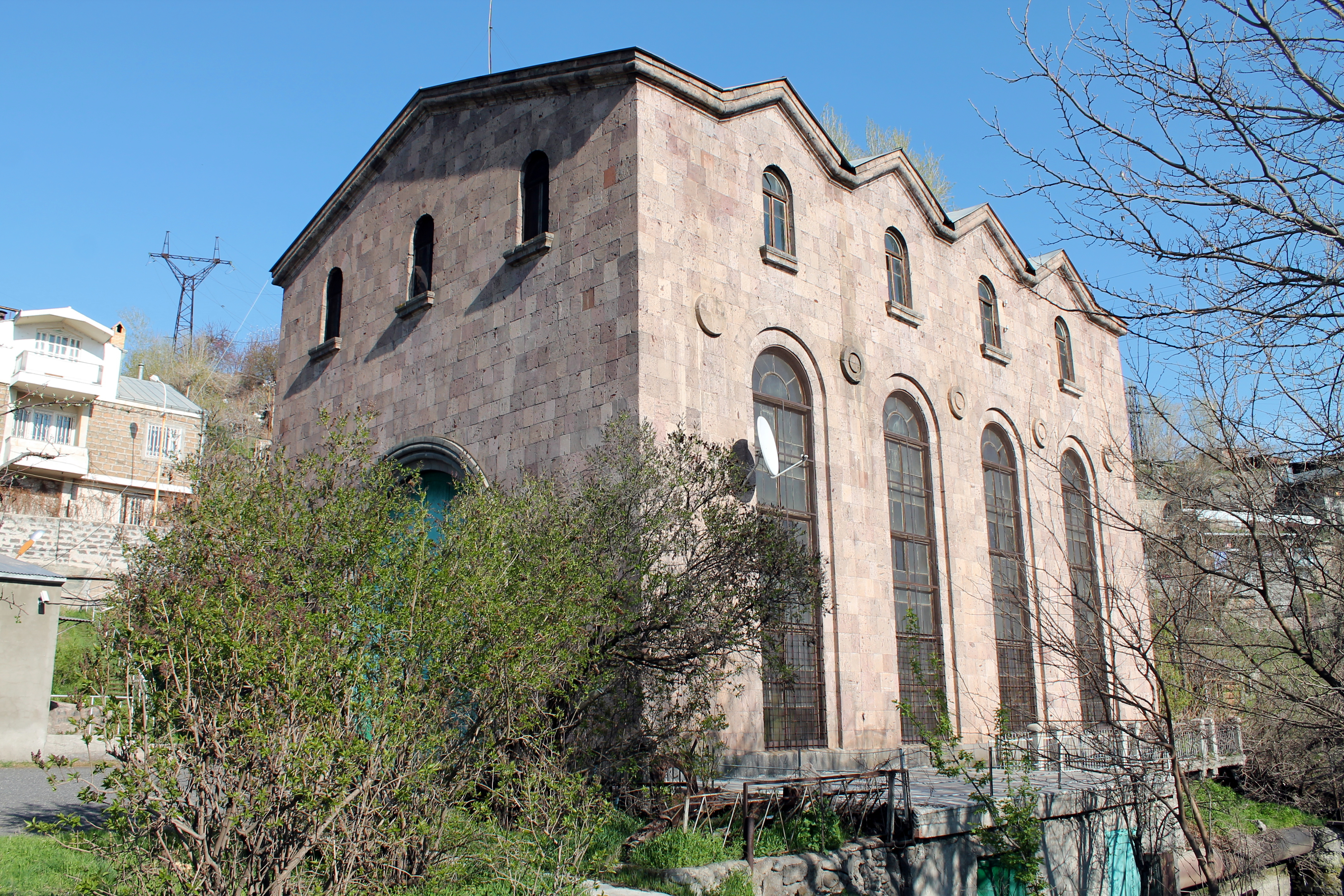
- Building of the Yerevan-3 HPP
- Interactive map of Yerevan-3 HPP
- Location: Yerevan
- Coordinates: 40°09′51″N 44°30′03″E
- Status: Operational

Power Station
- Commission date: 1960
- Hydraulic head: 37 m (121 ft)
- Turbines: 1 x 5 MW
- Installed capacity: 5 MW
- Annual generation: 50 GWh

Sevan–Hrazdan Cascade (Armenian: Սևան-Հրազդան Կասկադ) is a complex of hydroelectric power plants on the Hrazdan River and its tributaries between the Lake Sevan and Yerevan in Armenia. They use irrigation water flow from the Lake Sevan and streams waters of Hrazdan River. The cascade is owned by the International Energy Corporation (IEC), a subsidiary of Tashir Group owned by Samvel Karapetyan.

== History ==
The first small-scale Yerevan Hydroelectric Power Plant (HPP) was built in 1923.

In 1932, it was replaced by Yerevan-2 HPP. The construction of the current cascade started in 1936, when the Kanaker HPP was opened. That time it was planned to build the whole cascade by 1947. In 1940, construction of the Sevan HPP started but due to World War II, construction was suspended and the HPP became operational only in 1949. The largest HPP, Argel HPP, was opened in 1953, followed by Arzni HPP in 1953, Yerevan-3 HPP in 1955, Hrazdan HPP in 1959 and Yerevan-1 HPP in 1962. The original plan included also construction of three more HPPs—Upper Argavand HPP, Lower Argavand HPPand Noragavit HPP—but these plants were never built.

In 2003 the cascade was given to Inter RAO UES in return for US$25 million debt by Armenia. For operation of the cascade, the IEC was incorporated.

In 2011, Rushydro bought the IEC from Inter RAO.

In 2019 newspaper reported, that Rushydro is going to sell at $2.7 million cascade to Tashir group, owned by Samvel Karapetyan. By then the same Tashir Group already owned electricity distributions networks in the country. Buyer had to settle all debts running at $55.13 million by the end of September 2019. The deal was signed in December 2019 and finalized in early 2020.

== Technical description ==
Sevan–Hrazdan Cascade is stretched over about 70 kilometres (43 mi) and consists of seven hydroelectric power plants (HPP), with total nominal capacity of 565 MW. The HPPs are Sevan, Hrazdan, Argel, Arzni, Kanaker, Yerevan-1 and Yerevan-3—all run-of-the-river type. The cascade produces about 10% of Armenia's electricity. p Electricity generation at the Sevan–Hrazdan Cascade is highly dependent on the amount of water drainage from the Lake Sevan and it is suitable for the daily peak generation. Five HPPs operate all year long and two HPPs work only during the irrigation season when additional water is available in the system. Therefore, the power generation during the winter is limited.

The water is transported from the Lake Seven to the HPPs through open diversion canals and tunnels. Most of these canals were built in 1960s and are now in poor conditions and require rehabilitation.

== Power plants ==
Power Plant	Year	Number of Units	Installed Capacity (MW)	Available Capacity (MW)	Unavailable Capacity (MW)	Coordinates
Yerevan-3 HPP	1960	1	5	5	0	40°9′51.1″N 44°30′3.3″E
Yerevan-1 HPP	1962	2	44	22	22	40°11′22.2″N 44°29′55.5″E
Kanaker HPP	1936	6	100	87.5	12.5	40°13′14″N 44°31′6″E
Arzni HPP	1956	3	70.6	70.6	0	40°17′48.5″N 44°35′18.9″E
Argel HPP	1953	4	224	168	56	40°22′44.1″N 44°36′28.5″E
Hrazdan HPP	1959	2	81.6	81.6	0	40°30′29.2″N 44°45′39.4″E
Sevan HPP	1949	2	34.2	24	10.2	40°33′17″N 44°57′55.5″E
Total		20	559.4	458.7	100.7	

Source: IEC, Asbarez

=== Sevan Hydroelectric Power Plant ===
The Sevan Hydroelectric Power Plant, is the upper power station of the cascade. It is an underground power station locating 100 metres (330 ft) below the surface. It has two turbines with a total nominal capacity of 34.2 MW and the factual capacity of about 24 MW. Its nominal annual generation is 130 GWh, but the factual generation for the last years has been about 15 GWh. The water intake of the Sevan HPP was renovated in 2010.

=== Hrazdan Hydroelectric Power Plant ===
The Hrazdan Hydroelectric Power Plant, known as Atarbekyan during the Soviet years, is located between the Sevan and Argel stations. It has two turbines with a total installed capacity of 81.6 MW. Its nominal annual generation is 375 GWh, but the factual generation for the last years has been about 40 GWh.

=== Argel Hydroelectric Power Plant ===
The Argel Hydroelectric Power Plant, is located between the Hrazdan and Arzni stations. It is the largest power plant of the cascade. It has four turbines, supplied by LMZ, with total installed nominal capacity of 224 MW and available capacity about 168 MW. Its nominal annual generation is 870 GWh, but the factual generation for the last years has been about 200 GWh. The plant is important for ensuring the frequency of the Armenian power system, ensuring the emergency supply to the Metsamor Nuclear Power Plant, and supplying peak-load capacity.

In May 1995, landslides caused by heavy rains destroyed one of the plant spillways and blocked the Hrazdan River channel. It was restored and reopened in 2000 and 2006 correspondingly.

=== Arzni Hydroelectric Power Plant ===
The Arzni Hydroelectric Power Plant is located between of the Argel and Kanaker stations. It has three turbines with total installed capacity of 70.6 MW. Its nominal annual generation is 300 GWh, but the factual generation for the last years has been about 80 GWh.

=== Kanaker Hydroelectric Power Plant ===
The Kanaker Hydroelectric Power Plant is located next to the Rusal Armenal aluminum smelter in the Kanaker-Zeytun District of Yerevan, in between of the Arzni HPP and the Yerevan-1 HPP. It has a total installed capacity of 100 MW which consists of four turbines with capacity of 12.5 MW each and two turbines with capacity of 25 MW each, all supplied by LMZ. The nominal installed capacity is 100 MW and the factual capacity is 87.5 MW. Its nominal annual generation is 425 GWh, but the factual generation for the last years has been about 110 GWh. The plant is important for providing the peak-load capacity as also supplying Yerevan with irrigation and industrial water.

The plant was rehabilitated in 1993–1995, a project financed by USAID, Energy pour l’Armenie and Aznavour pour l’Armenie. In 1995, the unit 5 and in 2000, the unit 6 were shut for the renovation, financed by the loan from KfW. These units were reopened in 2003. The renovation was carried out by Alstom Power Generation.

=== Yerevan Hydroelectric Power Plant-1 ===
The Yerevan Hydroelectric Power Plant-1 is located between the Kanaker and Yerevan-3 stations, at the central Kentron District of Yerevan. It has two turbines with the total installed nominal capacity of 44 MW and available capacity of 22 MW. Its nominal annual generation is 210 GWh, but the factual generation for the last years has been about 50 GWh. It supplies the center part of Yerevan.

=== Yerevan Hydroelectric Power Plant-3 ===
The Yerevan Hydroelectric Power Plant-3 is located in Yerevan. It has one turbine with an installed capacity of 5 MW. Its diversion channel and penstock are part of the Artashat irrigation channel.

== Rehabilitation project ==
There is a rehabilitation project going on the Sevan–Hrazdan Cascade that is predicted to be completed in 2017. The main goal of the rehabilitation project is to re-establish the initial capacity of the cascade. The planned works for the rehabilitation project include a complete reconstruction of Yerevan-1 HPP. Sevan HPP, Hrazdan HPP, Argel HPP, Arzni HPP, and Kanaker HPP will have a new electrical equipment, such as new accumulators and generators. Also the hydro units of Argel HPP, Hrazdan HPP and Kanaker HPP will be replaced.

As there is a plan to dredge Yerevan-1 dam right on the biological environment—there is also a high-level risk because of increased turbidity. Another negative impact may be expected due to works and equipment transportations, which would cause pollution and noise, resulting in a social indignation. The rehabilitation process will not include any further expansion or creation of new facilities—all the work items are approved according to the plan.

== See also ==
- Energy in Armenia
