= Mishik Kazaryan =

Russian-Armenian physicist (1948–2020)

Mishik A. Kazaryan
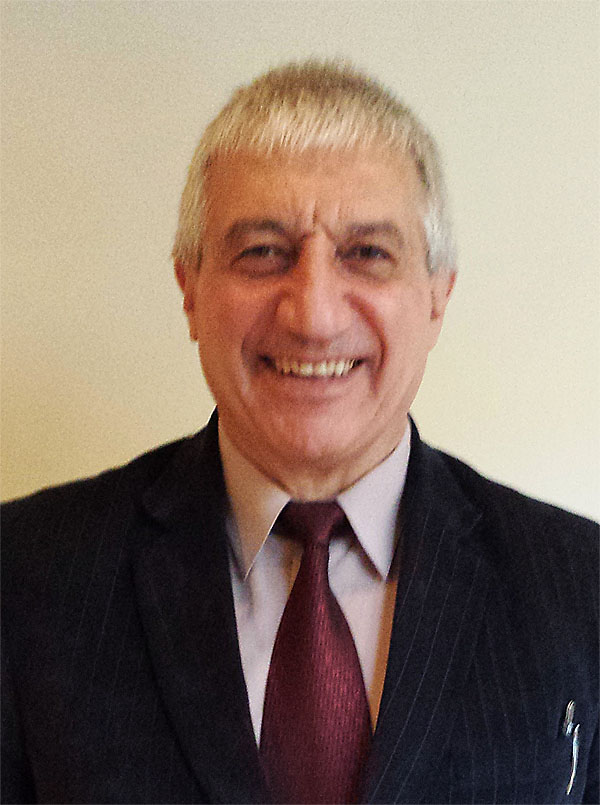
- Born: 28 February 1948; Akhta, Armenian SSR
- Died: 7 April 2020 (aged 72); Moscow, Russian Federation
- Education: Moscow Institute of physics and technology
- Known for: Creator of the most vivid pulsed laser for the visible region of the spectrum
- Awards: State prize of the USSR
- Scientific career
- Fields: Physics

Mishik Airazatovich Kazaryan (Russian: Мишик Айразатович Казарян; 28 February 1948 – 7 April 2020) was a Russian-Armenian physicist specialising in laser physics and optics, the winner of the State Prize of the USSR in the field of science and technology, foreign member of the Armenian National Academy of Sciences, member of the AM Prokhorov Academy of Engineering Sciences. Kazaryan was a creator of the brightest repetitively pulsed laser in the visible region of the spectrum.

== Biography ==
Kazaryan's father, Airazat G. Kazaryan Gabrielovich, was a physician, who worked at the Yerevan Medical Institute; his mother, Serik O. Vanuni, was an honoured Doctor of the Armenian SSR, and an obstetrician-gynecologist at the Markaryan Yerevan Maternity Hospital.

In 1970 Mishik Kazaryan graduated from the faculty of general and applied physics of Moscow Phycotechnical Institute in specialty "Optics and Spectroscopy." Since 1970 he worked in P.N.Lebedev Physical Institute, and at the Department of Luminescence as the leading researcher. In 1975 he defended his PhD-thesis and in 1989 Dr. Hab. thesis. Mishik Kazaryan was conferred the professor title.

The main research fields of Prof. Kazaryan were related to the creation of powerful tunable lasers, the study of the basic physical mechanisms responsible for the implementation of the Kazaryan plasma 3D-effect, the construction of acousto-optical color television systems and devices, laser medicine, the study of the mechanisms of laser acceleration of microparticles, studies of light-induced phenomena at multiple dynamic light scattering, and electrically induced drift aquacomplexes in aqueous solutions, the development of new approaches to the problem of laser isotope separation, the development of new solutions to the problem of alternative and hydrogen energy, the development of new composite materials with a long luminescence, the synthesis of new nanomaterials.

Prof. Kazaryan was one of the leading scientists working in the field of physics of gas lasers and active optical systems. He published a number of reports in leading scientific journals and encyclopedias, international patents, 26 books and 9 collections of selected articles in various international journals. He published more than 700 scientific papers. M.A.Kazaryan established a new method of exciting metal vapor lasers. He developed highly efficient lasers which are currently commercially available in Russia.

For his work on the physics of lasers and optical systems, MA Kazarian together with team members were awarded the State Prize of the USSR in the field of science and technology for 1980.

M.A.Kazarian together with Alexander Prokhorov, Yuri Gulyayev and Yuri Trutnev developed many aspects of modern laser physics and its applications.

In 2003 he was elected a full member of the A.M.Prokhorov Academy of Engineering Sciences and in 2008 a Foreign Member of the National Academy of Sciences of Armenia.

Mishik Kazaryan was a supervisor of many international projects of ISTC and CRDF. He was the scientific secretary of the Scientific Council on Luminescence, a member of program and organizing committees, chairman of the sections at many national and international conferences.

Mishik Kazaryan lectured on physics of lasers and their applications in many research centers and universities in Russia and many other countries.

Under the leadership of Prof. Kazaryan a number of specialists, working in Russia and in the CIS countries and abroad, was prepared.

Mishik Kazaryan paid great attention to the popularization of science. He was a scientific consultant for several scientific popular films, among them a documentary film “Shchelkin. Godfather of the First atomic bomb” (2019)], dedicated to life path and scientific heritage of Kirill Shchelkin ( https://vimeo.com/373170058 ).

Prof. Kazaryan was a member of the editorial board of international scientific journals "Lasers in Engineering", "Alternative Energy and Ecology", a member of the Council of the Euro-Asian Physical Society, a member of the "National Foundation of Science and Advanced Technologies" in Armenia.

M.A.Kazaryan was awarded the A.I.Berg Medal (2013) and the N.N.Semenov Medal.

== Personal life ==
Professor Kazaryan was married to Arpik Hasratyan (Asratyan), who was a doctor and a known Professor in the field of epidemiology and virology. They had two children, a daughter, Serine Kazaryan, who is a gynecologist and a son, Airazat Kazaryan, who is a surgeon.

Kazaryan died on 6 April 2020 in Moscow due to complications from COVID-19, ten days after his wife had also died from COVID-19.

Obituaries of Mishik Kazaryan and his wife Arpik Asratryan were published in the journal “Science”.

A documentary called “Mishik Kazaryan: The Path of an Explorer” dedicated to his life path and scientific heritage, was released in 2021.

== Books ==
In English:

1. Bokhan PA, Buchanov VV, Fateev NV, Kalugin MM, Kazaryan MA, Prokhorov AM, Zakrevskii DE. Laser Isotope Separation in Atomic Vapor. Wiley-VCH, 2006: 198 pages

2. Batenin VМ, Buchanov VV, Boichenko AM, Kazaryan MA, Klimovskii II, Molodykh EI. High-brightness Metal Vapour Lasers: Volume I: Physical Fundamentals and Mathematical Models. CRC Press, 2016: 542 pages

3. Gulyaev YuV, Kazaryan MA, Mokrushnin M, Shatkin OV. Acousto-Optical Laser Systems for the Formation of Television Images. CRC Press, 2018: 284 pages

4. Grigor'yants AG, Kazaryan MA, Lyabin NA. Laser Precision Microprocessing of Materials. CRC Press, 2019: 438 pages

5. Hunda Li, Kazaryan MA, Shamanin IV. Electroinduced Drift of Neutral Charge Clusters in Salt Solutions. CRC Press, 2020: 222 pages

In Russian:

1. Пасманик ГА, Земсков КИ, Казарян МА, Беспалов ВИ. Оптические системы с усилителями яркости. Горький: ИПН АФ СССР, 1988: 173 стр.

2. Батенин ВМ, Бучанов ВВ, Казарян МА, Климовский И, Молодых Э. Лазеры на самоограниченных переходах атомов металлов. Москва: Научная книга, 1998: 543 стр.

3. Бохан ПА, Бучанов ВВ, Закревский ДЭ, Казарян МА, Калугин ММ, Прохоров АМ, Фатеев НВ. Лазерное разделение изотопов в атомарных парах. Москва: Физматлит, 2004: 216 стр.

4. Григорьянц АГ, Казарян МА, Лябин НА. Лазеры на парах меди: конструкция, характеристики и применения. Москва: Физматлит, 2005: 312 стр.

5. Батенин ВМ, Бойченко А, Бучанов ВВ, Казарян МА, Климовский И, Молодых Э. Лазеры на самоограниченных переходах атомов металлов - 2: в 2-х томах, Том I. Москва: Физматлит, 2009: 544 стр.

6. Бохан ПА, Бучанов ВВ., Закревский ДЭ, Казарян МА, Прохоров АМ, Фатеев НВ. Оптическое и лазерно-химическое разделение изотопов в атомарных парах. Москва: Физматлит, 2010: 232 стр.

7. Казарян МА, Ломов ИВ, Шаманин ИВ. Электрофизика структурированных растворов солей в жидких полярных диэлектриках. Москва: Физматлит, 2011: 190 стр.

8. Батенин ВМ, Бохан ПА, Бучанов ВВ, Евтушенко Г, Казарян МА, Карпухин В, Климовский И, Маликов М. Лазеры на самоограниченных переходах атомов металлов - 2: в 2-х томах, Том II. Москва: Физматлит, 2011: 616 стр.

9. Казарян МА, Коновалов КБ, Косова НИ, Малиновская ТД, Манжай ВН, Нефедов РА, Самбуева ОБ, Сачков ВИ. Жидкотопливные антитурбулентные присадки / под ред. М.А.Казаряна. Томск: Издательство научно-технической литературы, 2014: 109 стр.

10. Латышенко КП, Гарелина СА, Гусев АЛ, Казарян МА. Техническая оценка зданий и сооружений: в 2-х томах, Том I. Саров: Научно-технический центр "ТАТА", 2014: 253 с.

11. Латышенко КП, Гарелина СА, Гусев АЛ, Казарян МА. Техническая оценка зданий и сооружений: в 2-х томах, Том II. Саров: Научно-технический центр "ТАТА", 2014: 299 с.

12. Гуляев ЮВ, Казарян МА, Мокрушин ЮМ, Шакин О.В. Акустооптические лазерные системы формирования телевизионных изображений. Москва: Физматлит, 2016: 240 с.

13. Евтушенко ГС, Казарян МА, Торгаев СН, Тригуб МВ, Шиянов ДВ. Скоростные усилители яркости на индуцированных переходах в парах металов. Томск: STS, 2016, 245 стр.

14. Гарелина СА, Латышенко КП, Гусев АЛ, Казарян МА. Техническая оценка зданий и сооружений (Второе издание, переработанное и дополненное): в 3-х частях, Часть 1. Химки: АГЗ МЧС России, 2016: 275 с.

15. Гарелина СА, Латышенко КП, Гусев АЛ, Казарян МА. Техническая оценка зданий и сооружений (Второе издание, переработанное и дополненное): в 3-х частях, Часть 2. Химки: АГЗ МЧС России, 2016: 311 с.

16. Гарелина СА, Латышенко КП, Гусев АЛ, Казарян МА. Техническая оценка зданий и сооружений (Второе издание, переработанное и дополненное): в 3-х частях, Часть 3. Химки: АГЗ МЧС России, 2016: 184 с.

17. Григорьянц АГ, Казарян МА, Лябин НА. Лазерная прецизионная микрообработка материалов. Москва: Физматлит, 2017: 416 стр.

18. Бохан ПА, Бучанов ВВ., Закревский ДЭ, Казарян МА, Прохоров АМ, Фатеев НВ. Оптическое и лазерно-химическое разделение изотопов в атомарных парах. Москва: Физматлит, 2-е изд., 2017: 227 стр.

19. Львов А, Де Конд М, Ставцев АЮ. Тернистый путь к летающим автомобилям. Санкт-Петербург: Нестор-История, 2017: 384 стр. (Мишель Де Конд - псевдоним М.А.Казаряна)

20. Хунда Ли, Казарян МА, Шаманин ИВ. Электроиндуцированный дрейф зарядовонейтральных кластеров в растворах. Москва: Физматлит, 2018: 208 стр.

21. Казарян АМ, Ревенко ВИ. Лазерная резка стекла. Москва: Физматлит, 2021: 136 стр.

== See also ==
- Atomic vapor laser isotope separation

== Sources ==
- The profile of Michika A. Kazarian on the website of the National of Academy of Sciences of Armenia
- The profile of Michika A. Kazarian in encyclopedia of the Fund "Hayazg"
  * * * Page on the website lebedev.ru
