= Makravank Monastery =

Armenian church-complex

Makravank Մաքրավանք
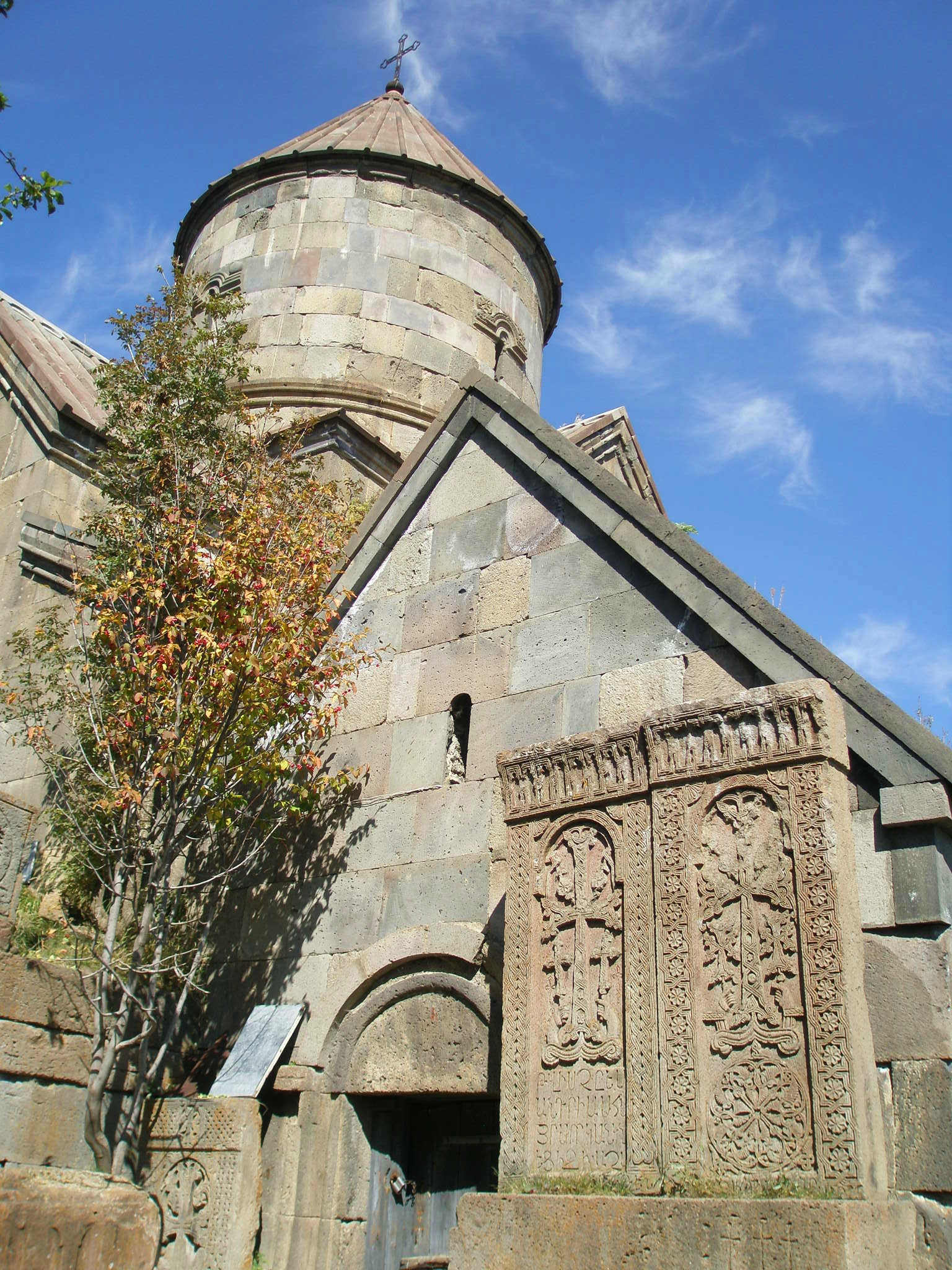
- 13th-century S. Astvatsatsin Church and 11th-century chapel (adjacent, right) at Makravank Monastery

- Location within Armenia

Religion
- Affiliation: Armenian Apostolic Church
- Status: Active

Location
- Location: Hrazdan, Kotayk Province, Armenia
- Coordinates: 40.5275°N 44.737222°E

Architecture
- Type: Cruciform central-plan
- Style: Armenian
- Completed: 10th-13th centuries
- Dome: 1

Makravank (Armenian: Մաքրավանք) is an Armenian church-complex located in the Makravan district of Hrazdan, the capital of Kotayk Province, Armenia. The monastic complex includes a half-ruined 11th-century chapel. The 13th-century church dedicated to Surb Astvatsatsin (Holy Mother of God) has a circular tambour and a conical cupola. The complex also includes the lower walls of the gavit and a medieval cemetery.

== Architecture ==
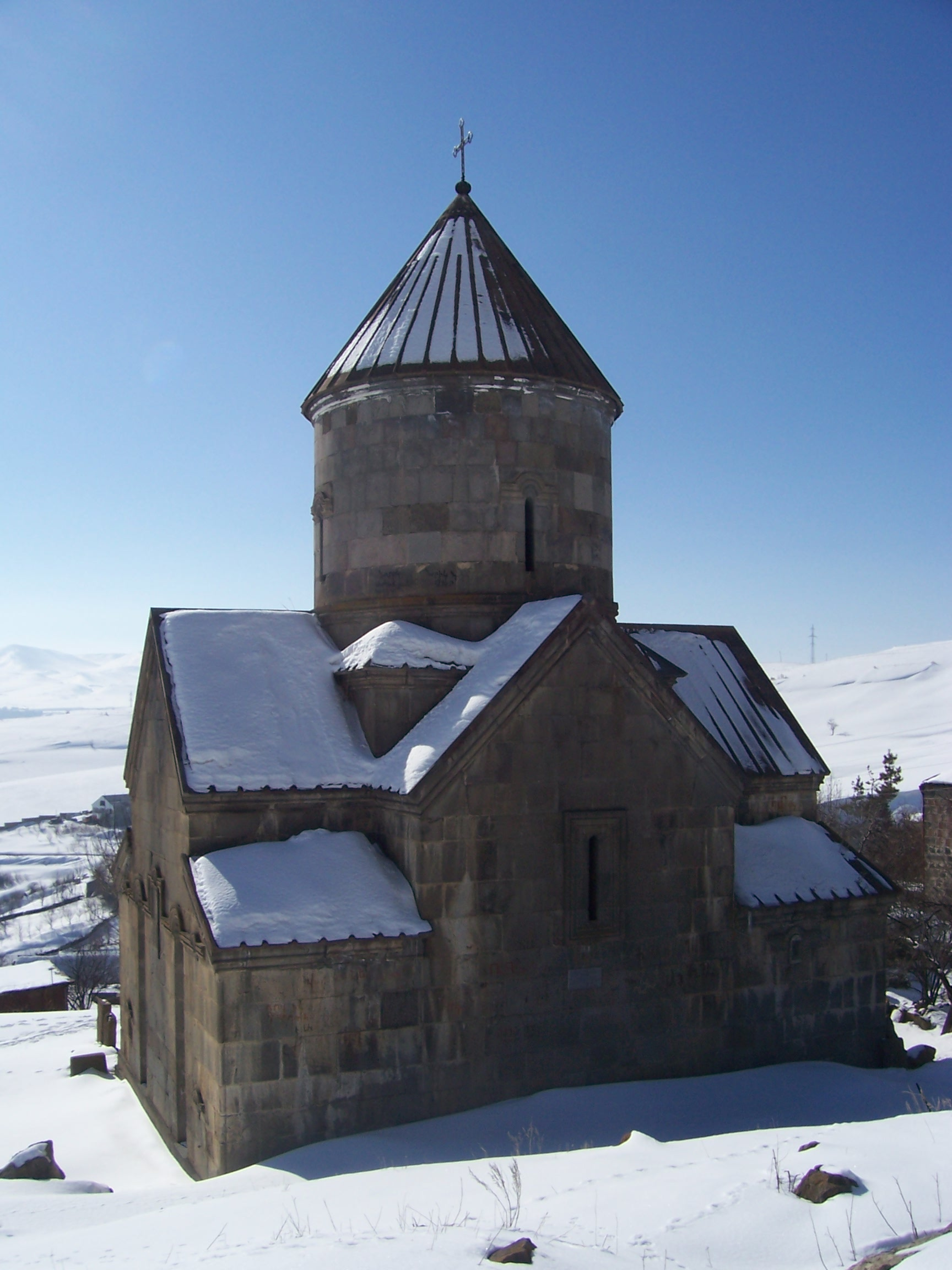
S. Astvatsatsin Church during winter

The Church of S. Astvatsatsin has a single central drum which supports a conical dome above. Narrow windows with bell style arches are positioned at each of the four cardinal directions. The arch of the window at the south end is flanked by Bolnisi style crosses at either side, while another example of this style of cross may be seen above the small window at the rear of the 11th-century chapel adjacent to S. Astvatsatsin. It is slightly different though, in that the cross stands on a stepped plinth. A single portal leads into the church, while a separate entry is utilized for the chapel. A semi-circular tympanum above the entry to S. Astvatsatsin contains a single-line inscription in Armenian and four Armenian-style crosses in bas-relief. Its altar is constructed of wood and is painted several different hues (reds, greens, blues, etc.).

The adjacent (south) 10th/11th-century Holy Redeemer chapel is a simple building with a gable roof. It has two small, narrow windows; one at the front, and one at the rear. A smaller semi-circular tympanum rests above the door to the chapel, while two large khachkars sit in front. To the west of S. Astvatsatsin and near the chapel, are the lower walls of the church's gavit that now serve as a wall for a courtyard. The monastery's medieval cemetery sits to the east and also has several interesting khachkars and tombstones.

== Gallery ==
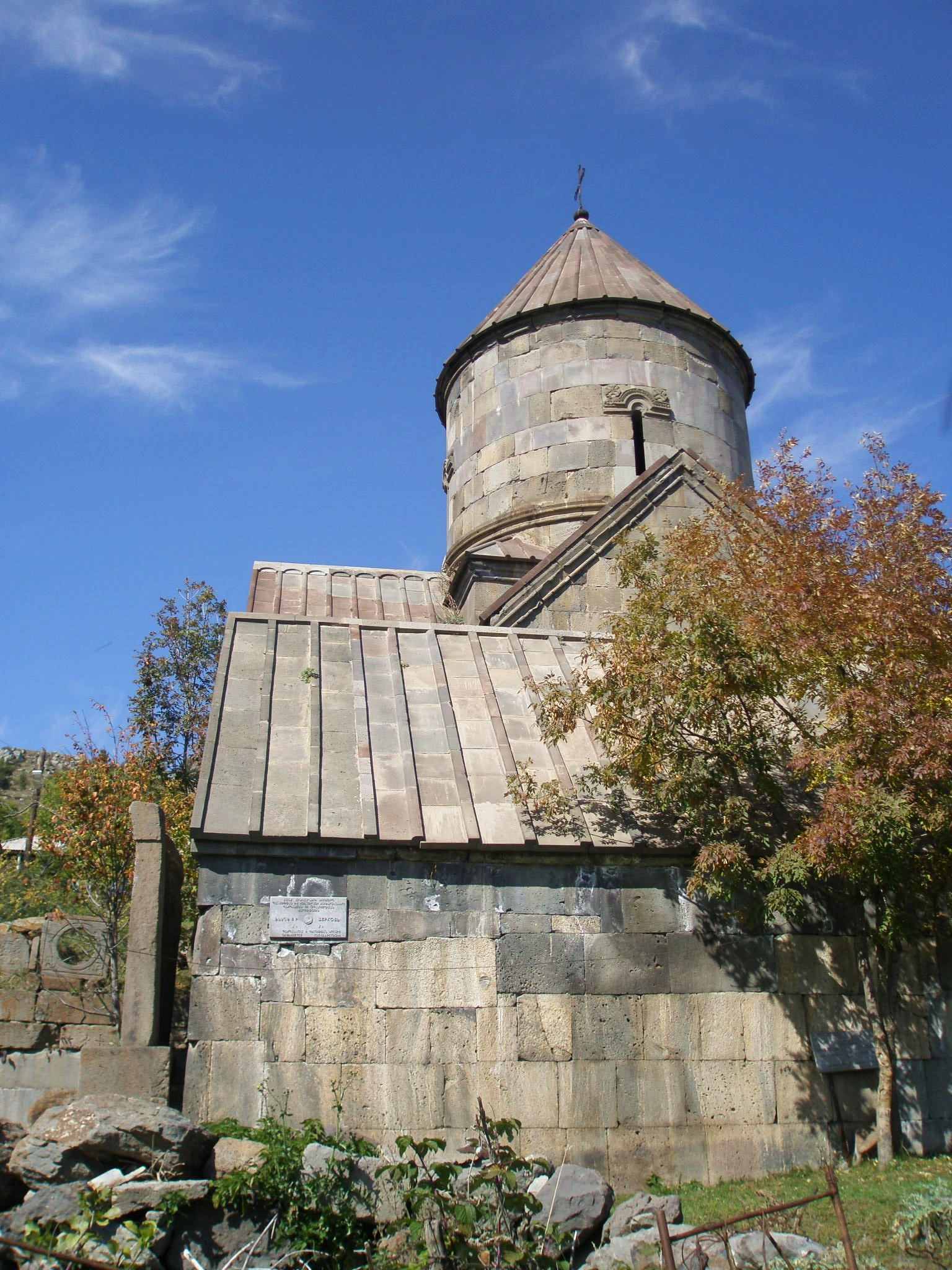
S. Astvatsatsin Church, south façade

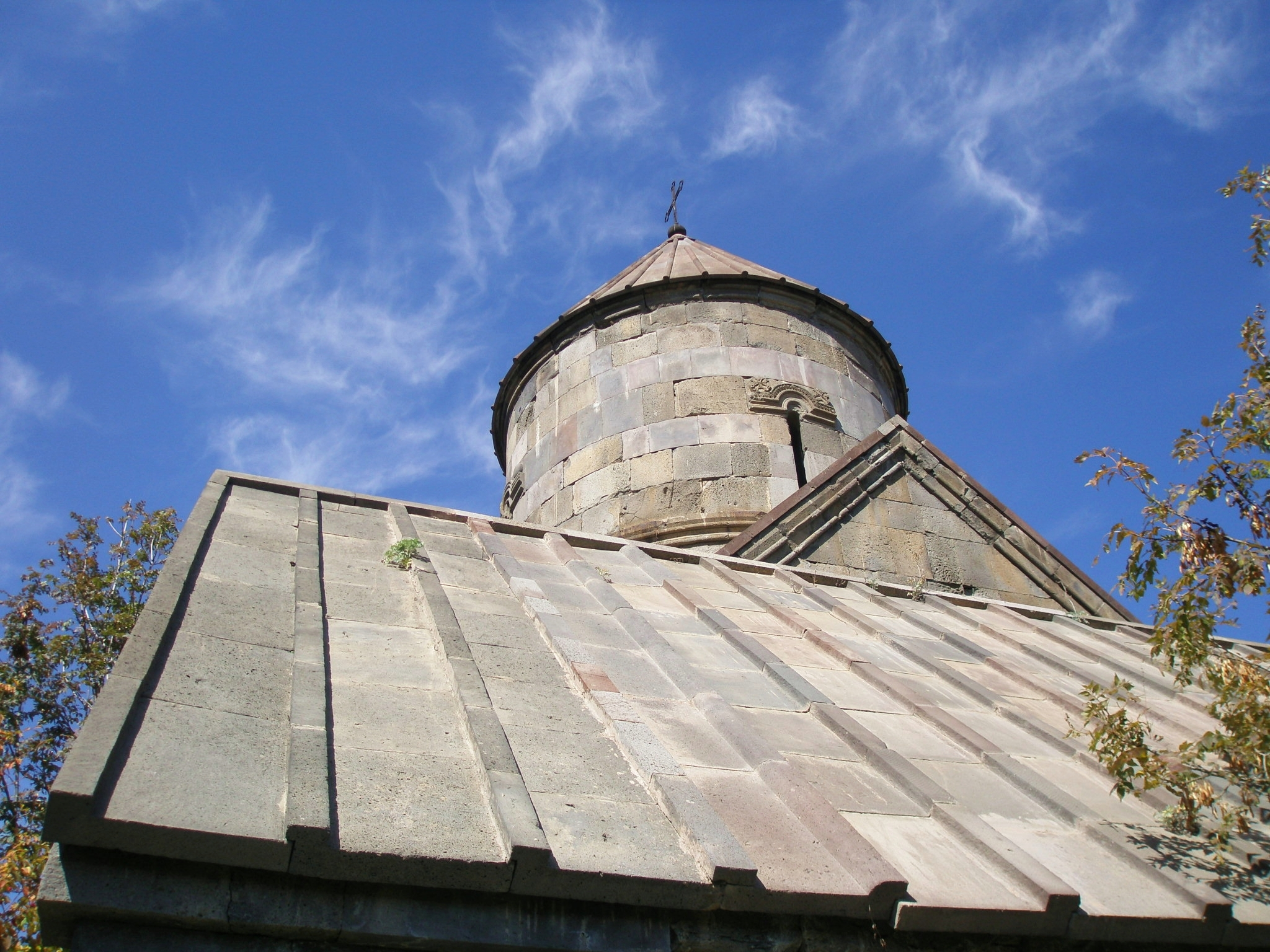
S. Astvatsatsin Church dome

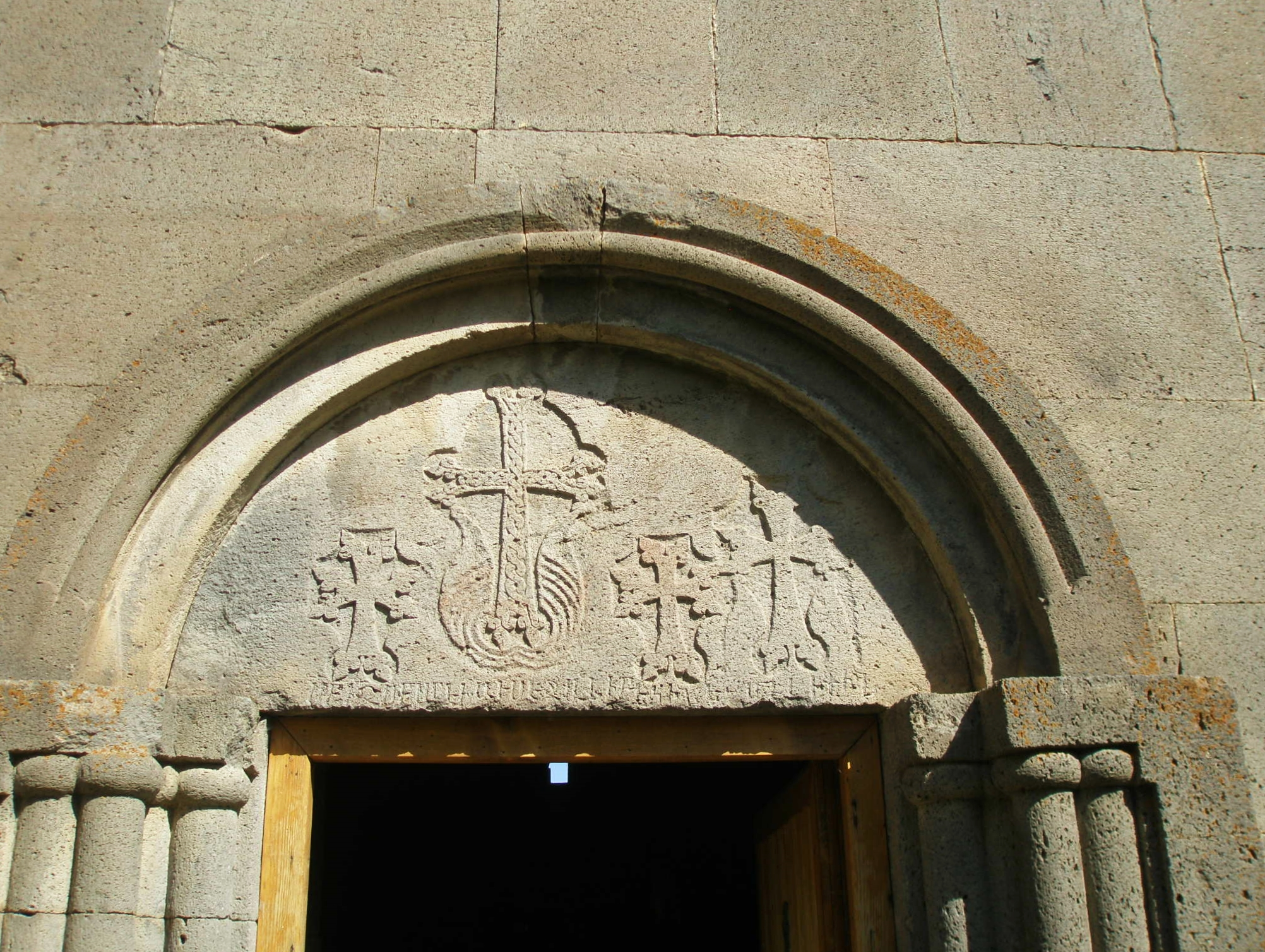
Tympanum above the entry to S. Astvatsatsin

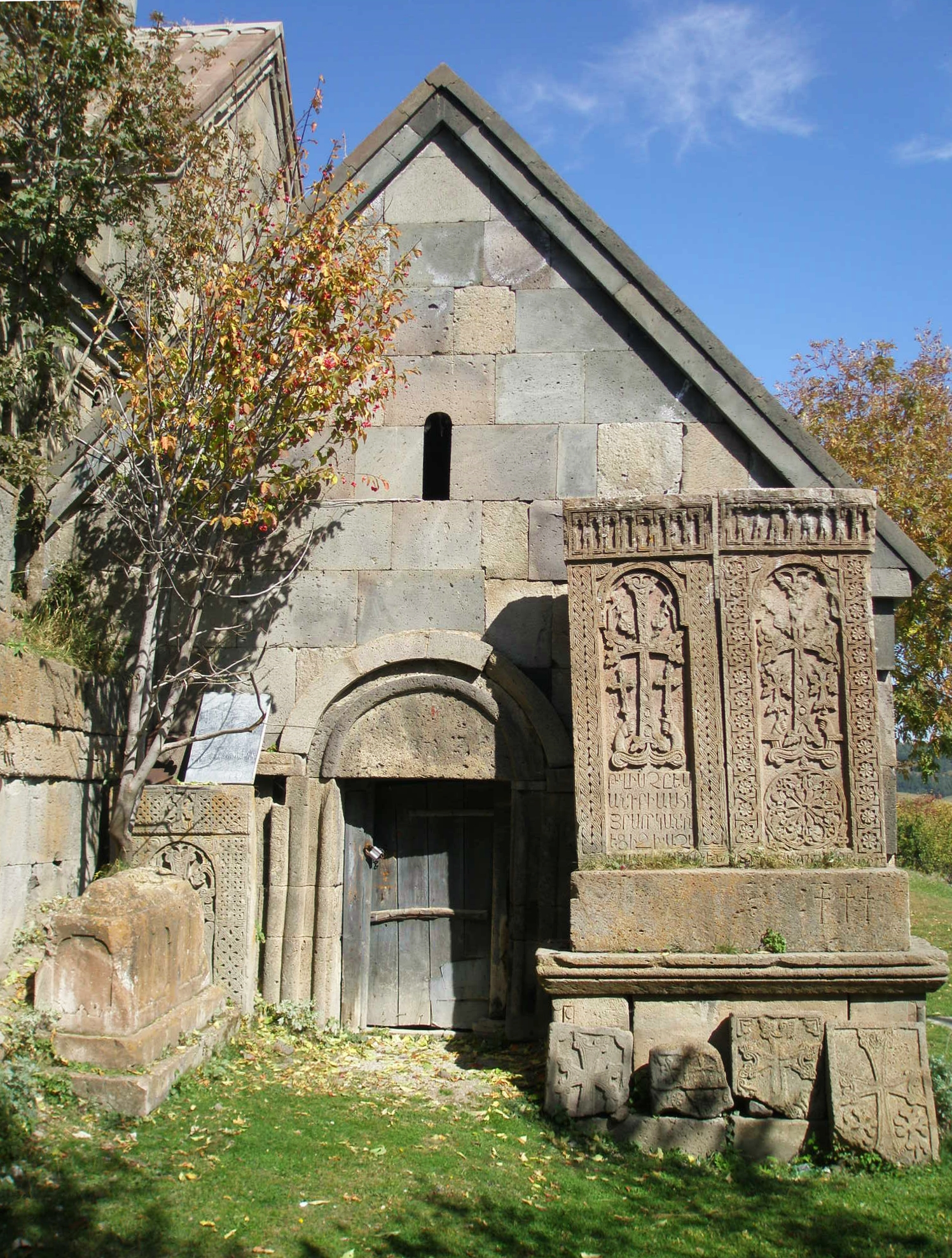
11th-century chapel adjacent to S. Astvatsatsin Church, west façade

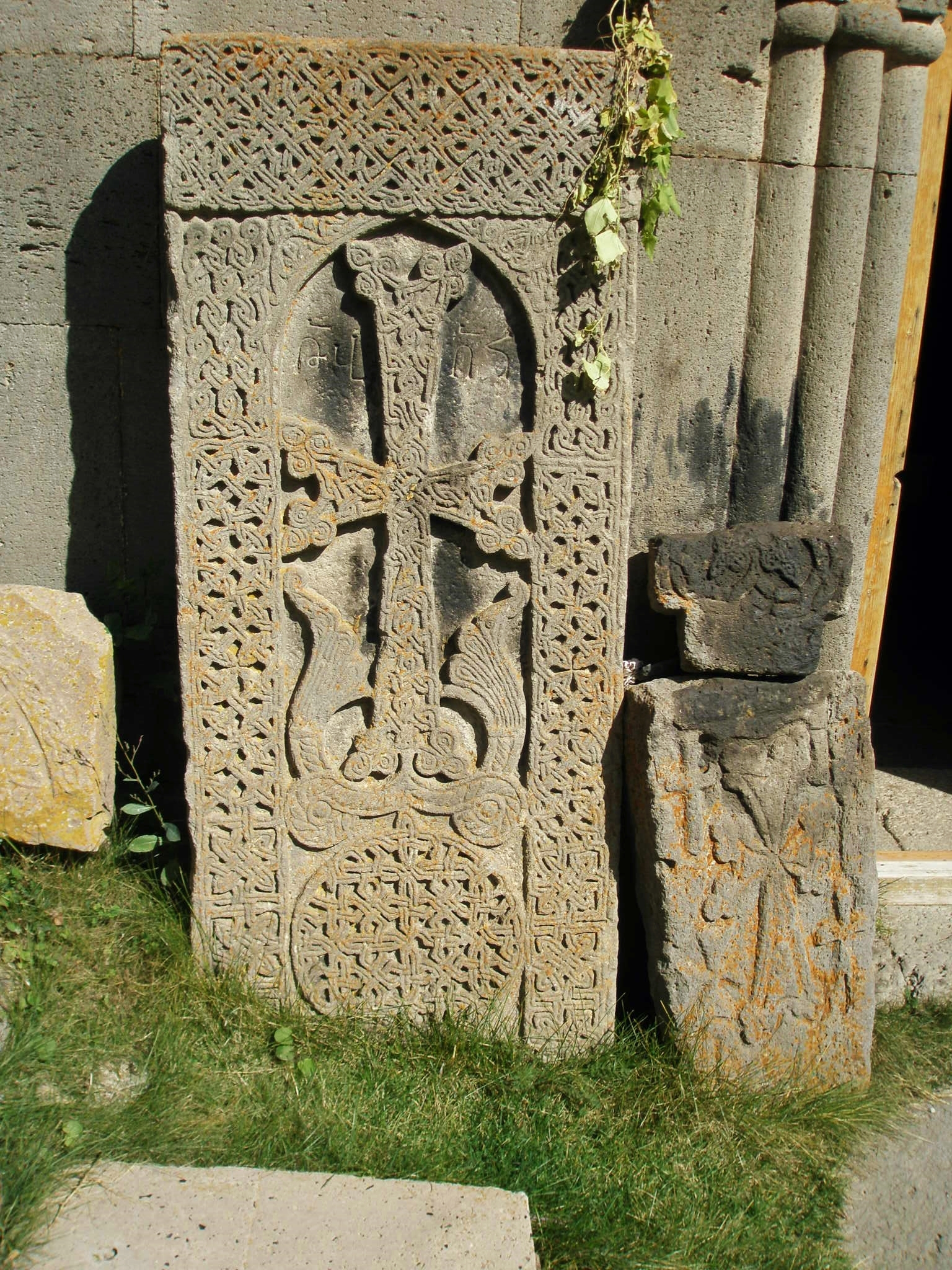
Large khachkar adjacent to the entry to S. Astvatsatsin Church

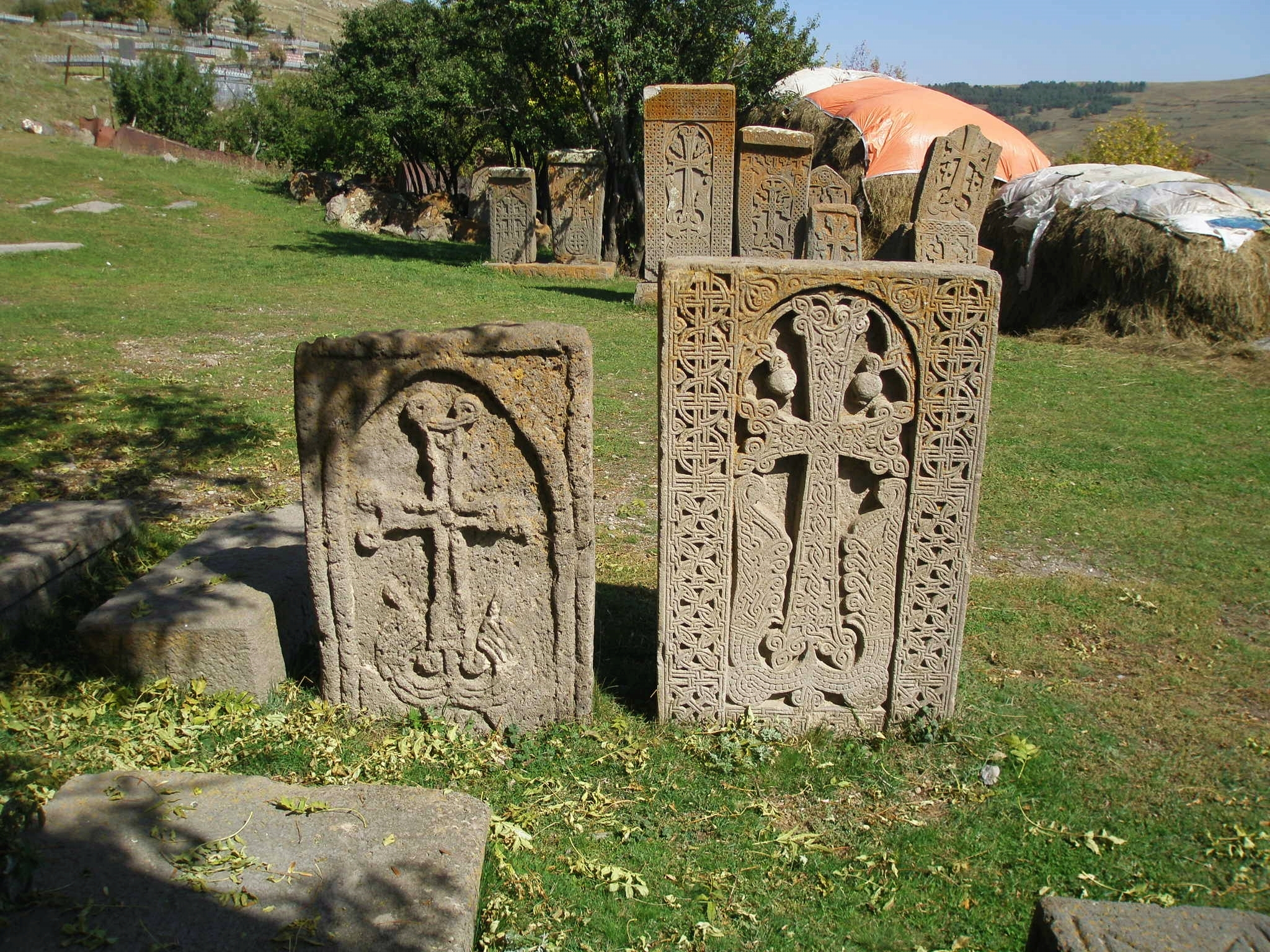
Cemetery with several khachkars

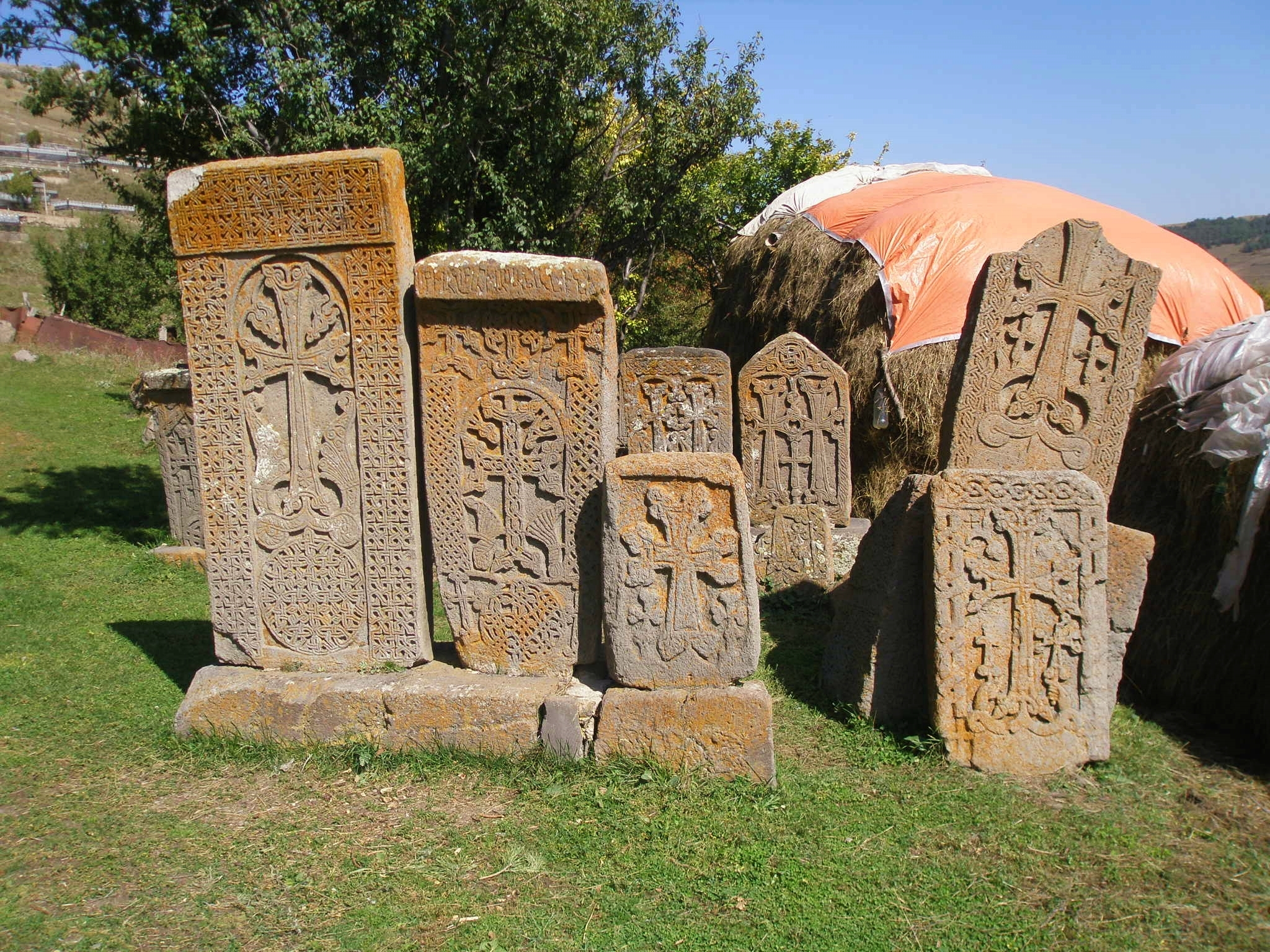
Cemetery with several khachkars

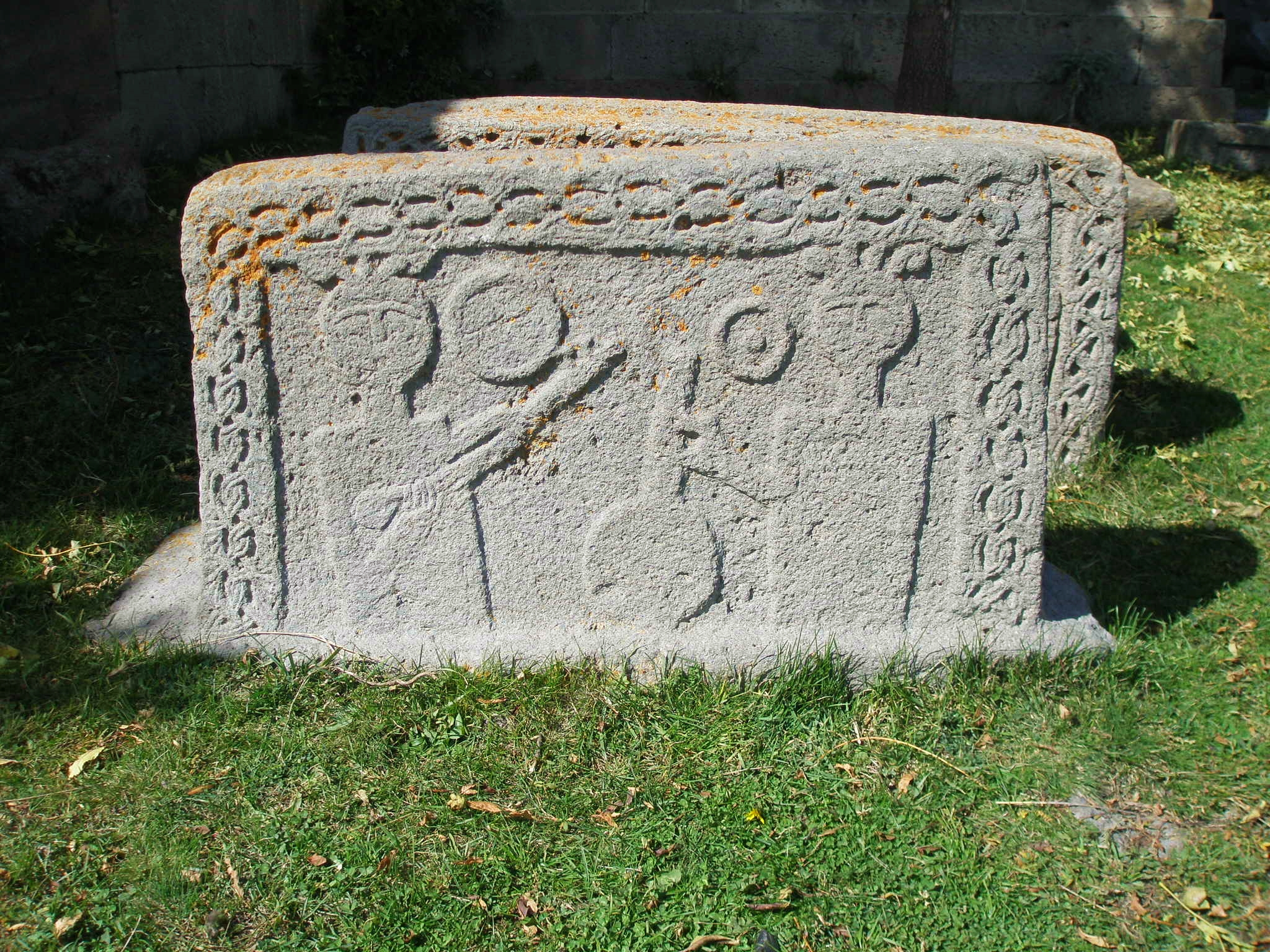
Tombstone depicting musicians
