= Seyran Osipov =

Russian footballer (1961–2008)

Personal information
- Date of birth: 4 December 1961
- Place of birth: Hrazdan, Armenian SSR
- Date of death: 13 January 2008 (aged 46)
- Place of death: Stavropol, Russia
- Height: 1.76 m (5 ft 9 1/2 in)
- Position: Forward

Youth career
- FC Mashuk Pyatigorsk

Senior career*
Years	Team	Apps	(Gls)
1979	FC Mashuk Pyatigorsk	16	(3)
1980	FC Dynamo Stavropol	4	(0)
1980–1981	FC Mashuk Pyatigorsk	34	(6)
1982	FC Dynamo Stavropol	8	(1)
1982–1984	FC Mashuk Pyatigorsk	64	(32)
1985	FC Ararat Yerevan	5	(1)
1985–1989	FC Dynamo Stavropol	170	(76)
1989–1990	PFC Hebar Pazardzhik	4	(0)
1990	FC Ararat Yerevan	4	(0)
1990–1992	FC Dynamo Stavropol	64	(21)
1992	→ FC Dynamo-APK Izobilny (loan)	2	(3)
1992–1993	Homenmen Beirut		
1993–1994	FC Dynamo Stavropol	28	(4)
- * Club domestic league appearances and goals

Seyran Osipov (Russian: Сейран Осипов; born 4 December 1961; died 13 January 2008) was a Russian professional footballer.

== Club career ==
He made his professional debut in the Soviet Second League in 1979 for FC Mashuk Pyatigorsk.
