= Makravan =

- Location within Armenia
- Coordinates: 40°31′23″N 44°44′23″E
- Country: Armenia
- Marz (Province): Kotayk
- Time zone: UTC+4 ( )

Makravan is a district of the town of Hrazdan and a former village in the Kotayk Province of Armenia. Upon the 12 January 1963 decision of the Supreme Soviet of the Armenian SSR on the territorial changes in the state, the villages of Atarbekyan, Jrarat, Kakavadzor and Makravan have been merged within the town of Hrazdan.

The Makravank Monastery of the 10th to 13th centuries is located in the district.

== Gallery ==
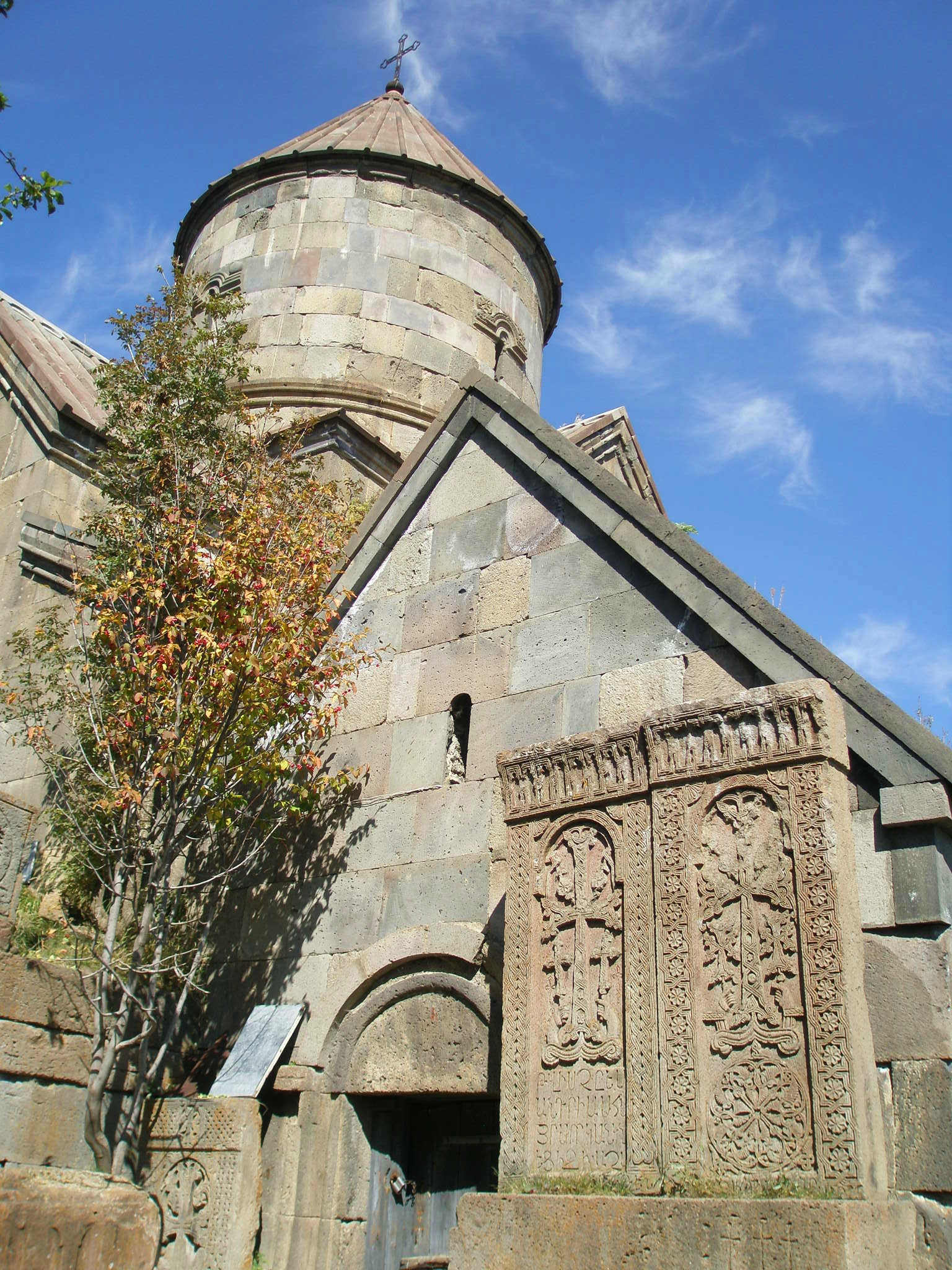
S. Astvatsatsin Church (13th century) and chapel (11th century; adjacent, right) at Makravank Monastery

== See also ==
- Kotayk Province
