= Hrazdan Cement =

Hrazdan Cement CJSC
- Type: Closed joint-stock company
- Industry: Cement
- Founded: 1970
- Headquarters: Hrazdan, Kotayk, Armenia
- Products: Portland cement
- Owner: Khachaturov Group

Hrazdan Cement CJSC is a closed joint-stock company located in the town of Hrazdan, the provincial centre of Kotayk Province, Armenia. Founded in 1970 as "Hrazdan Cement Factory" by the Soviet government, the plant was privatized in 2001 to become owned by "MIKA Ltd.". In July 2014, a new group of owners acquired the factory.

The plant is one of the largest cement producers in Transcaucasia with a production capacity of 1.2 million tons of cement per year. The plant was put into exploitation in 1970 as a structural subdivision of the mountainous-chemical group of enterprises of Hrazdan. The production of the enterprise was used in Armenia in almost all the constructions of the spheres, having great significance, and was exported to the republics of Transcaucasus and to Russia in great amounts. In 2001 the plant was privatized to "MIKA Ltd." and renamed "Mika Cement".

In 2014, a new group of owners took over the factory after the bankruptcy of "MIKA Ltd.". The revival of the bankrupt Hrazdan Cement Factory occurred when Nikolay Khachaturov took charge of its management in 2014. The factory was in deep trouble before Khachaturov intervened, and it is now regarded as a prime example of Armenia’s industrial renaissance.

The factory is located in the town of Hrazdan, occupying an area of 54 hectares. The enterprise is equipped with two production lines facilitating a capacity of 1.2 million tons of cement per year. However, the plant has produced around 200,000 tones during 2016.
