= Vanatur =

- Location within Armenia
- Coordinates: 40°32′02″N 44°46′09″E
- Country: Armenia
- Marz (Province): Kotayk
- City: Hrazdan
- Time zone: UTC+4 ( )

Vanatur is a former village and a neighborhood within the town of Hrazdan, Kotayk Province, Armenia.

== See also ==
- Kotayk Province

== Bibliography ==
- Vanatur at GEOnet Names Server
