= Diamond industry in Armenia =

The diamond industry in Armenia is a significant part of the country's manufacturing and exports. Armenia is a major supplier of diamond.

== Overview ==
Armenia, a country without many mineral fuels, is known for its diamond processing industry. The industry was established during the Soviet era and is considered one of the traditional sectors of Armenia's economy. After the collapse of the Soviet Union in 1991, the production declined gradually, but was later recovered with the investments from the Armenian diaspora. In 1999, the diamond industry provided about 30% of total manufacturing exports from Armenia. The industry started to show some slow decline again in mid-2000s, because of increase in cost of the production instruments and increase of the markets in China and India.

Today, over 50 diamond-cutting companies operate in Armenia. The estimated number of people involved in the industry is about 3,000 to 4,000. Some of the advantages of Armenia in diamond-cutting industry are the presence of a large number of ethnic Armenian jewelers abroad, who are willing to invest in the country and its access to Russian and international markets. Most diamonds polished in Armenia come from Israel, Russia and several EU countries, most notably Belgium.

== Armenian Jewelers Association ==
In 1998, the Armenian Jewelers Association (AJA) was founded by Armenian jewelers from around the world. Its mission is to "promote Armenian jewellers globally. Bringing together Armenian Jewellers and developing the jewelry industry in Armenia is a mission of great importance."

== Armenian diaspora ==
One of the important sectors that Armenian communities in Antwerp excel and involved in is the diamonds trade business, that based primarily in the diamond district. Some of the famous Armenian families involved in the diamond business in the city are the Artinians, Arslanians, Aslanians, Barsamians and the Osganians.

== See also ==
- Economy of Armenia
- Armenian jewelry
