= Nazeli Vardanyan =

Armenian environmental activist

- Նազելի Վարդանյան
- Born: Armenian Soviet Socialist Republic
- Citizenship: Armenia
- Occupations: Lawyer; Environmental activist
- Years active: 1999–present
- Organization: Armenian Forests
- Known for: Campaigning against the construction of the Amulsar gold mine

Nazeli Vardanyan (Armenian: Նազելի Վարդանյան) is an Armenian human rights activist and lawyer. The founder of the non-governmental organisation Armenian Forests, she is known for her campaigning against the construction of the Amulsar gold mine in the Vayots Dzor and Syunik provinces of Armenia. As a result of Vardanyan's activism, she has been subject to several lawsuits filed by the multinational corporation Lydian International, which have been described as judicial harassment by human rights groups including Front Line Defenders and the International Federation for Human Rights.

== Activism ==
Vardanyan qualified as a lawyer in 1999, focusing on environmental issues, and is based in Yerevan. She established the first public environmental court in Armenia, where environmental cases were heard, with judgements and rulings shared with Armenian government departments and institutions.

Vardanyan is the founder and head of the non-governmental organisation Armenian Forests (Հայաստանի Անտառներ, Hayastani Antarrner), which aims to protect and restore forests in Armenia through reforestation, advocacy, education and community engagement.

Vardanyan has campaigned against the construction of the Amulsar gold mine near the town of Jermuk since the early 2000s, several years before it was officially announced and its construction began in 2012. Vardanyan has raised concerns about its potential environmental, social and human rights implications; after construction began, she documented an increase in respiratory issues among residents of Jermuk due to dust in the air, in addition to the impact of pollution on water sources used for drinking and fishing. As a result of public protests against the construction of the mine by Armenian Forests, which increased as a result of the 2018 Armenian Revolution, work at the site ceased in 2018; the previous year, support for the mine from the International Finance Corporation was pulled as a result of Vardanyan's campaign. A working group on responsible state mining policy was subsequently set up by the Armenian government, in which Vardanyan was named as a member.

== Defamation lawsuits ==
=== First set of proceedings (2018–2021) ===
During a meeting of the working group on state mining policy, Vardanyan suggested that Lydian Armenia had committed by bribery, citing a transfer of money between the organisation and the Jermuk Foundation, which operated in Jermuk, the town closest to the Amulsar mine. In December 2018, Lydian Armenia filed a criminal complaint against Vardanyan on defamation grounds. On 11 June 2020, a domestic civil court ruled against Vardanyan, ordering her to pay Lydian Armenia 100, 000 AMD in damages in addition to publicly retracting her allegation. During the proceedings, a Facebook page titled "Green and Clean" published a video discreding Vardanyan's legal skills and made false allegations about her practice. The page was subsequently shut down after being deemed "offensive and defamtory"; Vardanyan publicly stated she believed the page was linked to Lydian Armenia.

Vardanyan appealed the ruling; on 25 June 2021, an appeal court reduced the damages to 50,000 AMD and upheld the requirement for her to publicly issue a retraction. Vardanyan subsequent appealed the case before the European Court of Human Rights, which in 2026 found that the proceedings violated Vardanyan's right to freedom of expression as guaranteed in article 10 of the European Convention on Human Rights.

=== Second set of proceedings (2026–present) ===
On 20 January 2026, an interview with Vardanyan was published by Panorama.am in which she expressed concerns about the reopening of the Amulsar mine on the environment and the health of people living nearby. She also disputed claims that the mine would increase Armenia's GDP by 1.5%, stating that any profits would only benefit Lydian Armenia and its stakeholders, and not the people of Armenia. Lydian Armenia subsequently filed a new lawsuit against Vardanyan, stating that the interview "did not reflect reality" and damaged the reputations of Lydian Armenia and the Amulsar mine. It requested that Vardanyan publicly apologise for the comments, and pay Lydian Armenia 6, 000, 000 AMD in damages.

During the proceedings, the Amulsar mine officially reopened on 1 October 2026. Armenian Forests criticised the reopening, stating it was "in defiance of popular resistance, community rights and domestic principles", with Vardanyan condemning the Armenian government for accepting 12.5% of Lydian Armenia's company shares on 18 January 2024. At COP17, held in Yerevan later that month, Vardanyan staged a protest at the Karen Demirchyan Complex. Attempts to march to Victory Bridge were prevented by the police.

On 29 October 2026, the Civil Court of General Jurisdiction of First Instance in Yerevan ruled that the trial against Vardanyan would continue. The next hearing is scheduled for 3 December. Vardanyan publicly accused the Armenian government of being part of the lawsuit due to its stakes in Lydian Armenia.

== Response ==
Front Line Defenders described the charges against Vardanyan as a "continued act of judicial harassment" and called on Armenian authorities to drop the charges against her. The International Federation for Human Rights and the World Organisation Against Torture, alongside the Civil Society Institute, expressed "serious concern" over judicial proceedings being initiated.
