= ITERA =

ITERA is the acronym for the Information and Telecommunications Education and Research Association. ITERA is a 501(c)(3) non-profit organization and was founded on the principle that leading educational institutions can greatly benefit from cooperative development of curricular and research objectives.

Through periodic conferences ITERA seeks to obtain greater consistency in the development of its members' degree programs and the kinds of courses for educating future telecommunications leaders.

== Membership ==
As of October 2008, its university membership includes:

- Ball State University
- Fort Hays State University
- James Madison University
- Illinois State University
- Liberty University
- Marion Technical College
- Michigan State University
- Murray State University
- Ohio University
- Oklahoma State University
- Pace University
- Purdue University
- Sauk Valley Community College
- Syracuse University
- Texas A&M University
- University of Colorado at Boulder
- University of Oklahoma Tulsa
- University of Pittsburgh
- Western Michigan University.
