= National Competitiveness Report of Armenia =

Annual publication

The National Competitiveness Report of Armenia (ACR) is an annual publication of EV Consulting and the Economy and Values Research Center (a partner institute of the World Economic Forum's Global Competitiveness Network) that aims to encourage and foster in-depth dialogue and analysis on improving Armenia's competitiveness.

The ACR provides a detailed assessment of Armenia's competitiveness position and benchmarks this position against its neighbors in the region. It attempts to take analytical look at Armenia's international competitiveness standing and the factors influencing it, by using contemporary conceptual frameworks for competitiveness.

The first ACR was published in 2008; the preface for the report was written by Armenia's Minister of Economy, Nerses Yeritsyan, and Harvard University Professor, Michael E. Porter, a leading authority on competitive strategy and international competitiveness. In his introductory note, M. Porter stated that "The first National Competitiveness Report of Armenia is a strong sign that Armenia is getting serious about competitiveness and about developing a true strategy for economic development."

== National competitiveness report of Armenia 2019: The Future of Jobs in Armenia ==
The report provides a comprehensive analysis of Armenia's economic performance and competitiveness from the perspective of the trends and structural changes of employment in Armenia. The Report analyzes and addresses job market challenges, shifts and opportunities in Armenia and proposes a reform agenda for workforce development to tackle the problems and capture strategic opportunities. It aims to foster in-depth dialogue between private and public sector representatives to form an agenda for building a competitive workforce and ensuring a high level of employment in the country.

Labor markets are undergoing structural transformations globally and locally. Economic, social-demographic, technological, and environmental drivers are changing the demand and requirements of businesses. Consequently, unique opportunities are being created for developing economies to boost their economic growth and catch up with advanced ones. These opportunities can be much wider for Armenia after radical political shifts in 2018 dubbed as the "Velvet Revolution". However, strong challenges also emerge such as the threat of job destruction, workforce market imbalance, skillset mismatch, and so forth. It is crucial that Armenia addresses those employment, and enables sustainable economic growth.

Job creation is a fundamental challenge for the Armenian economy. The current unemployment rate in the country is at 20.4%. Social polarization is also a major problem, as around 30% of the population is considered poor, while the Gini coefficient is at 37.5%. The mismatch of education system outputs with the current needs of employment and demographic changes (negative migration balance has been at on average 24,000 people per year for the 2011–2017 period) reflect the depth of the challenge. No other economic priority is more important than to build a competitive workforce and ensure a high level of employment.

== National Competitiveness Report of Armenia 2017: Our Role in the Fourth Industrial Revolution ==
The Report provides broad analytical insights into Armenia's economic performance during the last 25 years. The special focus of the Report is the Fourth Industrial Revolution, the global spread of disruptive technologies, and their complex impact and emerging opportunities for Armenia. The Report is aimed to foster in-depth dialogue among private and public sectors to form an agenda for the technology-enabled transformation of Armenia's economy.

Prosperity is largely driven by the level of competitiveness, which relies on productivity and institutions. Post-independence, Armenia's GDP increased more than eight-fold, but it has yet to recover to the pre-crisis levels of 2008. In recent years, improved economic diversification and expansion in export-oriented sectors have been the main engines behind the recorded growth. Armenia's GDP per capita has grown faster than the world average, peaking in 2015, but it masks the persistent income inequality. Life expectancy is steadily rising, yet along with sustained emigration and a low birth rate, it poses demographics threats to Armenia. In the post-crisis period, GDP recovery has been accompanied by an improved stance on competitiveness, demonstrated by higher quality institutions and productivity. However, so far, Armenia's competitiveness stance has remained at the same level it was a decade ago.

The Forth Revolution opens unprecedented opportunities for Armenia. The power of technologies can be harnessed to transform local industries as well as create new industries and sources of growth. Hence, a transformational strategy is required. Strategies should be based on creating options through small-scale, low-cost experimentation and then pursuing options that work. The evolutionary algorithm-create variety, select, and replicate.

== National Competitiveness Report of Armenia 2013–2014: Growth Imperative and Constraints ==
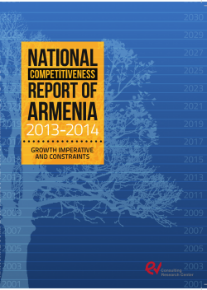
The National Competitiveness Report of Armenia 2013–14 Growth Imperative

Presentation of the National Competitiveness Report of Armenia 2013–2014 took place on 4 March 2014.

The preface for the report was written by Harvard University professor Ricardo Hausmann.

Unemployment, poverty, and emigration are the most critical social challenges for Armenia today. Thus, the economy's ability to create and sustain comparatively well-paying jobs is the first foremost test of its competitiveness. Competitiveness rests on the country's productivity with which it uses its resources. Enhancing productivity requires economic growth, or else it would be at the expense of employment.

For competitiveness policy, we introduce the concept of the Target State of Economy (TSE) as a state of the economy characterized by a substantially narrow productivity gap with major competitor countries that provides a job to every employable person with a satisfying compensation eliminating the purely economic motivations to emigrate.

The GDP growth level has a very high stake in reaching the TSE: with a 7% average annual growth rate, the TSE can be reached in 10 years, whereas 10% GDP growth can ensure the same results by 2016. At the current annual growth rate of Armenia economy at 3–4% the TSE is reachable only by 2040.

ACR identifies four key areas that currently impede growth through restraining more productivity and massive investment in the country. The change agenda that needs to spearheaded by both public and private sectors includes the following policy areas: Creating a level playing field, Industrial policy, Massive investment in education, and Sophistication of the financial system.

== National Competitiveness Report of Armenia 2011–2012: Agenda for Upgrading Management Practices ==
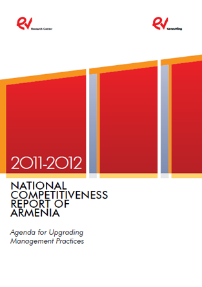
National Competitiveness Report of Armenia 2011–2012 Agenda for Upgrading Management Practices

Presentation of the National Competitiveness Report of Armenia 2011–2012 took place on 18 April.

The report analyses Armenia's competitiveness performance since 2005 with a special focus on the management practices at Armenian private companies. The report has been prepared by the Economy and Values Research Center and EV Consulting.

The competitiveness performance of Armenia steadily decreased since 2005 but reversed to the positive in 2011-reflecting structural shifts. A comprehensive study of management practices at Armenian companies identified significant gaps with the global best practice. The study based on the World Management Survey methodology carried out by EV Consulting at approximately 50 manufacturing companies assessed operational, target, and talent management practice. Armenia lags behind benchmark 21 countries with an average score of 2.46 compared to the global average level of 2.99 and the benchmarked Ireland's level of 2.89. Its gaps with the best practices are larger in operations and target management, but substantially less in talent management where Armenia outperforms such countries as Argentina, Brazil, Greece, and Portugal.

Spreading better management practice in Armenia requires collaborative and synchronized efforts of both public and private sectors. Both sectors should undergo three phases: Motivation, Seeding, and Diffusion. In the Motivation phase, the public sector will face promoting competition and indirect incentives, on the other hand, the private sector will deal with internal and external pressure. During the Seeding phase, the public sector will try to encourage MNC entry, improve the business education level and promote corporate governance. The private sector will concentrate on people, processes, and structural changes. In the final 3rd phase, the public sector will work on promoting networks and publicizing the success, and the private sector will be concentrated on engaging external agents and rolling out through the organization.

The prefaces for the report were written by the Prime Minister of Armenia Tigran Sargsyan and Stanford University Professor Nicholas Bloom.

== National Competitiveness Report of Armenia 2010: Higher Education Challenge ==
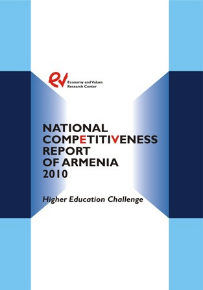
National Competitiveness Report of Armenia 2010 Higher Education Challenge

The third Armenian competitiveness report focused on the higher education challenge of Armenia.

The report was launched on 24 December 2010 and addressed by the Minister of Economy Tigran Davtyan, Minister of Science and Education Armen Ashotyan and the Executive Director of National Competitiveness Foundation of Armenia (NCFA) Bekor Papazyan.

In the World Economic Forum's Global Competitiveness Report 2010-2011, Armenia ranked 98 out of 139 countries, down one spot from the previous report. The report showed modest improvements in health, education, and goods market efficiency, and declines in macroeconomic stability and financial markets. The report concluded that the country's advantages include its labor market regulations, tariff levels, and ease of starting a business, as well as the low impact of disease, crime, and terrorism on business activities. Disadvantages include capital market development and factors affecting competitive environment.

Meanwhile, the global economic crises revealed that Armenia's economy is more vulnerable to external events than most peer and benchmark countries-and its recovery remains very vulnerable to global economic processes that compound local economic problems. These problems include low and unevenly distributed labor productivity, lack of economic diversification and overconcentration in construction and low productivity agriculture, declining imports of high-tech goods, rising dependence on resource-oriented exports, inflation, and a growing external public debt.

Another crisis could have a much bigger impact on Armenia, therefore a national economic strategy and a new model of economic development, one that can weather a variety of economic shocks, strengthen microeconomic fundamentals, broaden job opportunities, enable labor movement into productive sectors and attract "knowledge-oriented" foreign direct investment. A cornerstone of the new economic model is a globally competitive educational sector, especially at higher levels. The chief five groups of factors that must be addressed in transforming Armenia's higher education sector should be: strategy, internationalization, leadership, learning elements, and social values

== National Competitiveness Report of Armenia 2009: Sowing the Seeds of an Innovation Ecosystem ==
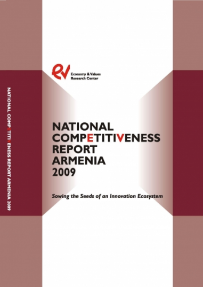
National Competitiveness Report of Armenia 2009 Sowing the Seeds of an Innovation Ecosystem

The second Armenian competitiveness report focused on the study of the country's innovation performance.

Based on the World Economic Forum's competitiveness rankings ACR 2009 states that the fall in Armenia's international competitiveness came to a halt in 2009: Armenia ranks 97th out of 133 countries, registering no change compared to the 2008 ranking.

The continuous decline in competitiveness ranking during the previous years pointed out the non-sustainable nature of economic growth drivers, which were expected to become apparent under negative external shocks, such as global economic crisis. ACR 2009 monitors the influence of the crisis on the Armenian economy through the effects on foreign remittances (a strong Armenia-specific factor), the foreign exchange market, inflation, public finance, and perceived risk as measured by ratings of international rating agencies.

The core theme of ACR 2009 is innovation. The report states that in the context of competitiveness, Armenia has moved toward a new development stage, where the role of the competitiveness drivers is changed. The role of performance of macroeconomic indicators, institutions and basic infrastructure is more significant for countries in the first stage of development. Currently, economic efficiency and innovation capacities assume a growing importance for Armenia. Hence, innovation is critical to the creation of a knowledge-based economy which in turn is vital to a country like Armenia that is landlocked, has scarce natural resources and faces high transportation costs.

A framework based on National innovation system concept (developed by OCED) has been employed and adopted in the report for assessing Armenia's performance in innovation. It provides holistic picture by looking at innovation process as combination of different elements of innovation system: inputs, outputs, policy framework, institutions, actors and the interactions among these actors.

The report argues that in order to foster innovation, particularly in production of goods and services, Armenia would do well to devise and implement a national innovation system. This will require a holistic approach in developing a long-term vision. The path a country takes is based on leverage points that policymakers can use to enhance innovation performance and overall competitiveness. ACR 2009 considers the demand source that triggers innovation activities to be the key leverage point. On the basis of generating demand or creating a lead market, the ACR distinguishes four kick-off or jumpstart strategic trajectories by the relative importance of policy focuses and actors. The report thoroughly describes the specifics of each strategy – Domestic Corporate-Led Strategy, MNC-Led or R&D Hub Strategy, Government-Led Strategy, Generic or Environment-Enabled Strategy, defines criteria for choosing a strategy for Armenia and the next steps of policy implementation. Each strategy description is complemented with success stories of the countries where similar strategies for development were employed.

The launch of ACR 2009 was addressed by the Prime Minister, the Minister of Economy and other high level state officials, representatives of business and international organizations. In his speech at the launch Armenia's Prime Minister Tigran Sargsyan stated that the publication is a high quality independent research meant to serve as a tool for public policy-making.

== National Competitiveness Report of Armenia 2008 ==
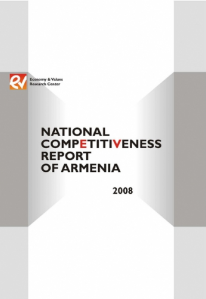
National Competitiveness Report of Armenia 2008

Based on the modern conceptual competitiveness frameworks, the report analyzes and describes Armenia's economic situation which is characterized as a "growth-competitiveness paradox" in ACR 2008. The paradox is reflected in the high rates of growth on most macro-economic metrics, but low and lagging competitiveness.

In the Global Competitiveness Report 2007–2008, produced by the World Economic Forum, Armenia ranked 93rd out of 131 countries in the Global Competitiveness Index (GCI) and 108th out of 127 countries in Business Competitiveness Index (BCI).

Alongside to the thorough analysis of the performance of competitiveness factors in Armenia, ACR 2008 addresses and gives recommendations on the public policy. According to the report Armenia has yet to adopt a development-driven policy context. It describes the evolution of Armenia's public policies as a transition from "survival context" in early 90s to "redistribution context" in late 90s and finally to "social or poverty reduction" context starting from early 2000s up until the publication date.

ACR proposes that in the next stage an economic development-focused strategy should address such issues as Armenia's global value proposition, key drivers of competitiveness, sectoral preferences, etc. It distinguishes two layers of action labeled as "Strategic Breakthrough" and "Quick Wins". The Quick Wins are targets that are achievable in a short time period, while actions in the Strategic Breakthrough sections define factors that may move Armenia to the next level of competitive position vis-à-vis other countries and direct competitors.

ACR 2008 concludes that Armenia still has a long way to go to create a highly competitive economy. The next stage requires more focused efforts, greater skills, higher aspirations, and visionary leadership.
