= Lydian International =

Lydian International Limited
- Type: Public
- Traded as: TSX:LYD; OTCQX: LYDIF
- Industry: Resources
- Founded: 2006
- Headquarters: Colorado, United States (registered in Jersey)
- Key people: Edward Sellers - CEO (2019-); Joao Carrelo - CEO (2018-19)
- Products: Gold
- Subsidiaries: Lydian Armenia (Armenia); Lydian Resources Georgia Limited (Georgia); Lydian U.K. Corporation Limited (United Kingdom); Lydian Canada Ventures Corporation (Canada)
- Website: lydianinternational.ca

Lydian International Limited is a multinational corporation with gold mining interests in Armenia and Georgia. Founded in 2005 the company is registered in the British Crown dependency of Jersey but headquartered in Greenwood Village, Colorado, United States. While it was formerly listed on the Toronto Stock Exchange, it was delisted in February 2020 as it sought creditor protection. Lydian International's major shareholders and lenders are the Resource Capital Funds (RCF Management LLC), Orion Resource Partners, Franklin Advisers of the Franklin Templeton Investments, the European Bank for Reconstruction and Development (EBRD), the state-owned Swedish Export Credit Corporation and others. Its ongoing active development is the Amulsar Gold Project located in south-central Armenia and 100% owned by Lydian International.

In 2011, the company was issued a permit for prospecting and development of another gold site, Kela (Qela) in neighboring Georgia, the administrative area of Zoti Village, Chokhatauri. According to Lydian International the Kela project at the present time "does not comprise a material aspect of the Corporation’s business operations."

== Amulsar ==
Located in south-central Armenia, 170 km away from the capital city Yerevan and 13 km from the popular mountain resort town of Jermuk, the Amulsar project is a high sulfide, epithermal-type gold silver deposit bedded in volcanic rocks and sat in a structurally complex zone. It is set to be a large-scale, low-cost, heap leach operation with estimated mineral resources of 3.5 million measured and indicated gold ounces and 1.3 million inferred gold ounces targeted to production of approximately 225,000 ounces (7 tons) annually over an initial 10-year mine life. Lydian International says to create about 770 permanent jobs during the eleven years of production, pay nearly $50 million in annual taxes and contribute to around 1.4% of GDP of Armenia. The claims were disputed by environmental activist Nazeli Vardanyan, who led a years-long campaign against the construction of the mine.

The company plans to use cyanide to leach gold concentrate at Amulsar and the project is reported to pose health impacts, environmental risks, negative effects on tourism. A 2018 sociological study conducted around the area by a number of international organizations found that "85.7 per cent of respondents observed negative impacts on health," such as increasing asthmatic attacks, lung diseases, dry skin, headaches and insomnia. Increased amounts of dust and muddy tap water in Jermuk and the nearby village of Gndevaz as well as an unusual dying of multiple fish in a local fish farm were reported after construction began in 2017. The mining project could potentially infringe on the habitat of the endangered Caucasian leopard.

The International Finance Corporation (IFC) of the World Bank Group withdrew from financing the project in 2017 following complaints by NGOs over environmental and health concerns.

Following the Armenian revolution of 2018 locals began a blockade of the mine in June of the same year after which Lydian International told that the protesters are conducting "artificial actions" and that other operators were trying to expel the company from Armenia. Lydian reported total losses of over $136 million as of 2018 and submitted notice to the Armenian government in March 2019 warning of plans to sue the country in corporate courts if the situation was not resolved.

Surrounded by three rivers and two reservoirs, the mine site sits above a tunnel supplying water to Lake Sevan, the Caucasus region's biggest body of water. One of the largest freshwater lakes in Eurasia, Lake Sevan which holds some 25% of Armenia's fresh water, provides irrigation water as well as 90% of the fish catch in Armenia, is argued to be threatened of contamination by sulfidic mine tailings of Amulsar. A 2019 biodiversity assessment report found that the approval of the Amulsar Gold Project was in violation of Armenian Law and of Article 7 of the EBRD Environmental and Social Policy; did not comply with several articles of the Bern Convention, and "Many of the measures proposed in the ESIA [Environmental and Social Impact Assessment] report are likely to lead to null effect or even additional/cumulative direct negative effect on the conservation status of natural habitats or species protected in the ASCI Emerald Site."

Lydian International commissioned an environmental impact assessment in 2016 that stated there would be no significant impacts on the environment and local water supplies. The company also said they had invested over $500 million prior to 2019, that the blockade cost the company $100,000 a day and that they had to terminate 1,270 contracts due to it.

A September 2019 openDemocracy article revealed details of advocacy British embassy representatives had carried out in favor of the mine project chronicling meetings between UK officials and Lydian representatives. The UK Foreign office was criticized by Labour MPs for its support of the mining company in Armenia. A Foreign Office spokesperson said in response: "British embassies play a positive role in helping to grow business around the world for UK companies. As such, the British embassy in Yerevan engages with British businesses active in the Armenian market."

During an August 29, 2019 video conference between the Lebanese company LARD and representatives of the Armenian government and members of parliament LARD experts told that "the activities proposed by Lydian have flaws... A new environmental impact assessment is needed," therefore they could not conclude that the mine would be safe. They also said the Investigative Committee had pushed ELARD toward making a positive assessment. Lydian responded that ELARD's statements at the conference were “misleading” and said opponents of the project were being funded by its competitors.

It was later reported that Armenia's Investigative Committee's official in charge of Amulsar, Yura Ivanyan, was related to the former environment minister who had earlier approved an assessment determining that the mine would be safe to operate which followed the announcement of an internal investigation into the matter by the Investigative Committee.

Armen Sarkissian, the president of Armenia between 9th April 2018 and 1st February 2022 occupied the position of director of Lydian International in 2013 prior to his appointment as the ambassador of Armenia to the United Kingdom.

The protestor blockade noted above led to the insolvency of the company, with the Amulsar project being transferred by lenders to a new company, Lydian Ventures.

On December 23, 2019 Lydian announced commencement of restructuring proceedings under the Canadian Companies’ Creditors Arrangement Act. https://www.globenewswire.com/news-release/2019/12/23/1964252/0/en/Lydian-Announces-Commencement-of-Restructuring-Proceedings-Under-the-Companies-Creditors-Arragnement-Act.html

On March 11, 2021 Lydian announced receipt of order to complete dissolution under Jersey law. https://www.globenewswire.com/news-release/2021/03/11/2191513/0/en/Lydian-Announces-Receipt-of-Order-to-Complete-Dissolution-Under-Jersey-Law.html

On 30 March 2021, Alvarez & Marsal Canada Inc., the court-appointed monitor, filed the termination certificate on the monitor’s website, confirming the dissolution was complete. https://www.alvarezandmarsal.com/content/lydian-monitors-reports https://www.alvarezandmarsal.com/sites/default/files/canada/ccaa_termination_certificate_march_30_2021.pdf
