= Solar power in Armenia =

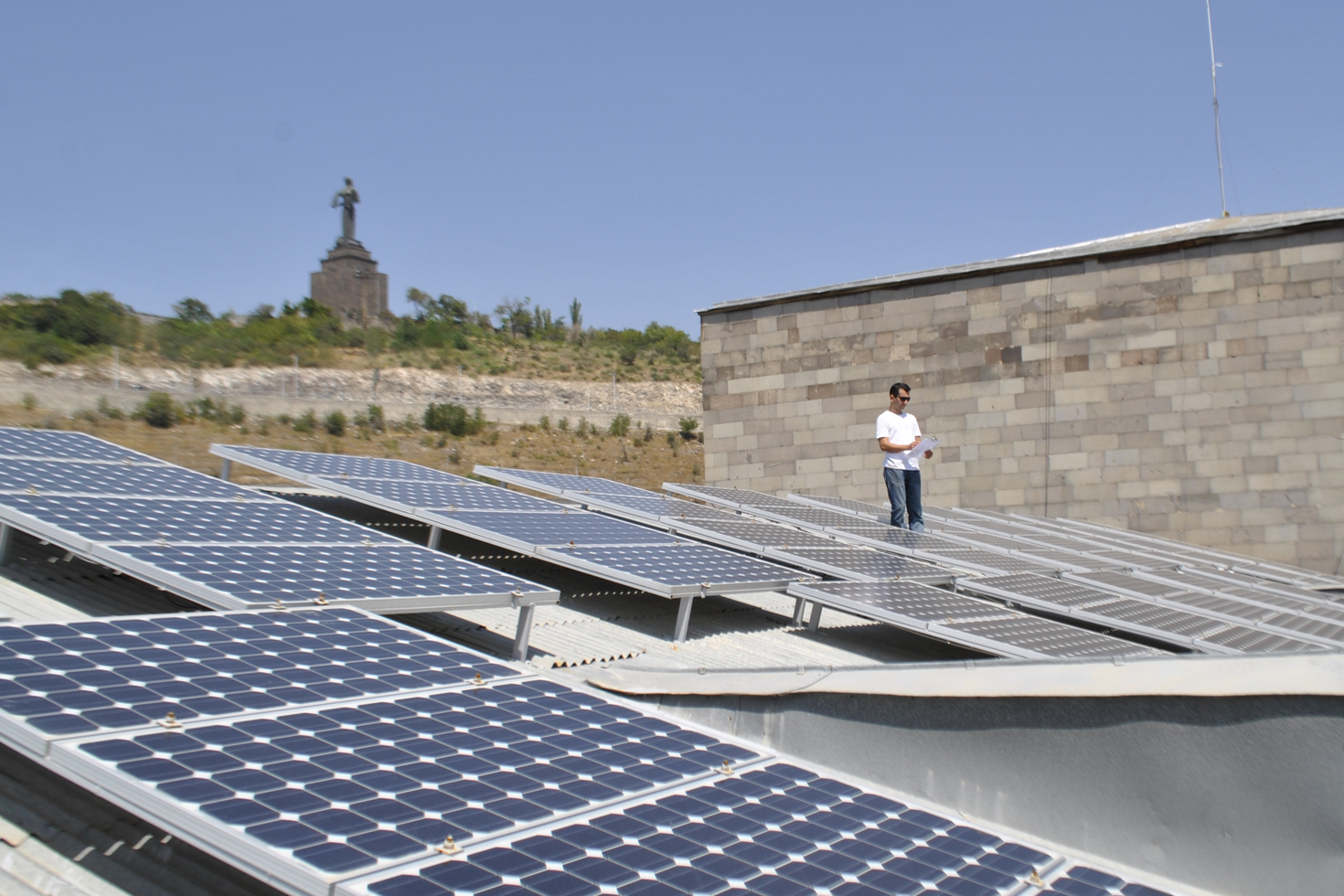
Solar panels at Armenian National Agrarian University, Yerevan

Solar energy is widely available in Armenia due to its geographical position and is considered a developing industry. In 2022 less than 2% of Armenia's electricity was generated by solar power.

The use of solar energy in Armenia is gradually increasing. In 2019, the European Union announced plans to assist Armenia towards developing its solar power capacity. The initiative has supported the construction of a power plant with 4,000 solar panels located in Gladzor.

Solar power potential in Armenia is 8 GW according to the Eurasian Development Bank. The reason for this is that average solar radiation in Armenia is almost 1700 kWh/m^{2} annually. One of the well-known utilization examples is the American University of Armenia (AUA) which uses it not only for electricity generation, but also for water heating. The government of Armenia is promoting utilization of solar energy.

In 2018 the amount of solar power produced in Armenia increased by nearly 50 per cent. Government figures show that Armenia's solar power average is 60 per cent better than the European average.

In March 2018 an international consortium consisting of the Dutch and Spanish companies won the tender for the construction of a 55 MW solar power plant Masrik-1. The solar power station is planned to be built in the community of Mets Masrik of the Gegharkunik region entirely at the expense of foreign investments. The expected volume of investments in this generation facility will be about $50 million. Construction of the plant was expected to be completed by 2020. In May 2019 the deadline for start of financing the Masrik-1 solar power plant construction project has been extended by 198 days.

== Potential ==
According to the Ministry of Energy Infrastructures and Natural Resources of Armenia, Armenia has an average of about 1720 kilowatt hour (kWh) solar energy flow per square meter of horizontal surface annually and has a potential of 1000 MW power production. In the capital Yerevan, the average solar energy flux is equal to 1642 kWh/m^{2}. Armenia's area cannot be considered as homogeneous from the perspective of available solar energy: the difference between the amount of solar energy reaching the ground in different places in the country can be up to 20% in the summer, and 50% in the winter.

== Photovoltaics ==
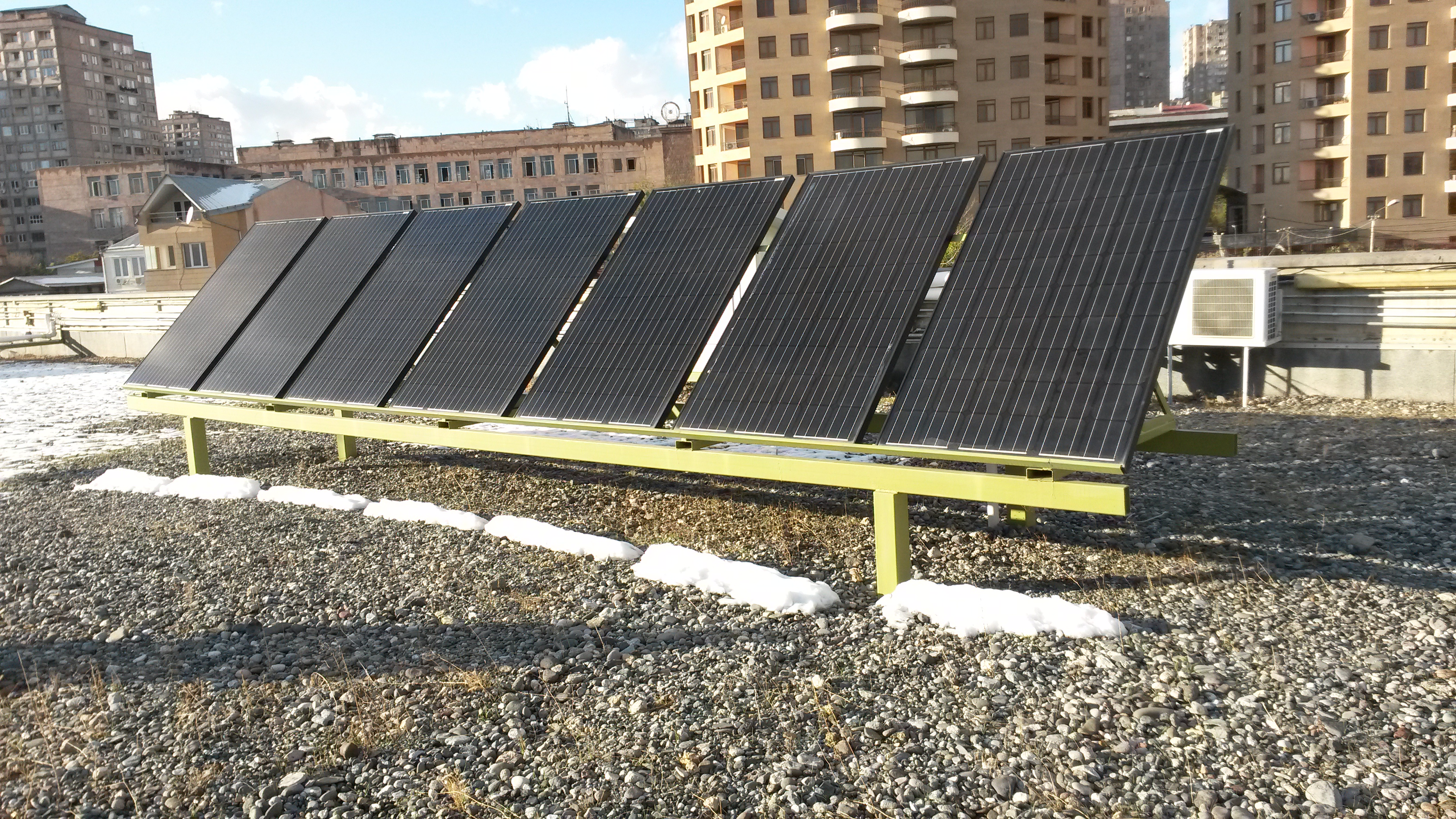
Solar panels on the rooftop of American University of Armenia

As of April 2019 ten 1 MW strong solar stations are installed. Solar and wind stations account for less than 1% of total installed electricity generation capacities. In April 2019 it was announced that German company Das Enteria Solarkraftwerk will build a 2 MW strong solar station near Shorzha at lake Sevan by end of 2020.

External image
- Maps of solar irradiation maps

Currently 9 solar PV plants (total installed capacity – about 7,02 MW) have been put into operation. Seven companies (totally 31,5 MW) have been licensed for the construction of the solar PV plant with up to 5 MW installed capacity.

As of February 20, 2019, technical terms were given to 907 autonomous energy producers with capacity up to 500 kW (total capacity 12,9 MW), 854 of which have already been connected to energy system (total capacity 10,3 MW). Example of buildings equipped with solar panels are the American University of Armenia generating enough power for the elevators and other uses, and the UN House in Armenia.

A 55 MW utility-scale solar power plant will be built near Mets Masrik in Gegharkunik province, requiring an investment of about $50 million. International tender was won by consortium of the Netherlands’ Fotowatio Renewable Ventures (FRV) B.V and Spain's FSL Solar S.L. that are expected to commission the plant in 2020.

There are defined tariffs for generating electricity using solar energy. In November 2016, Public Services Regulatory Commission of RA made a decision to set the price of electrical energy from photovoltaic systems to 42.645 AMD/kWh.

Consumers are allowed to install solar panels with total power of up to 150 kW, and may sell any surplus to electricity distribution company Electric Networks of Armenia (ENA).

== Thermal solar ==
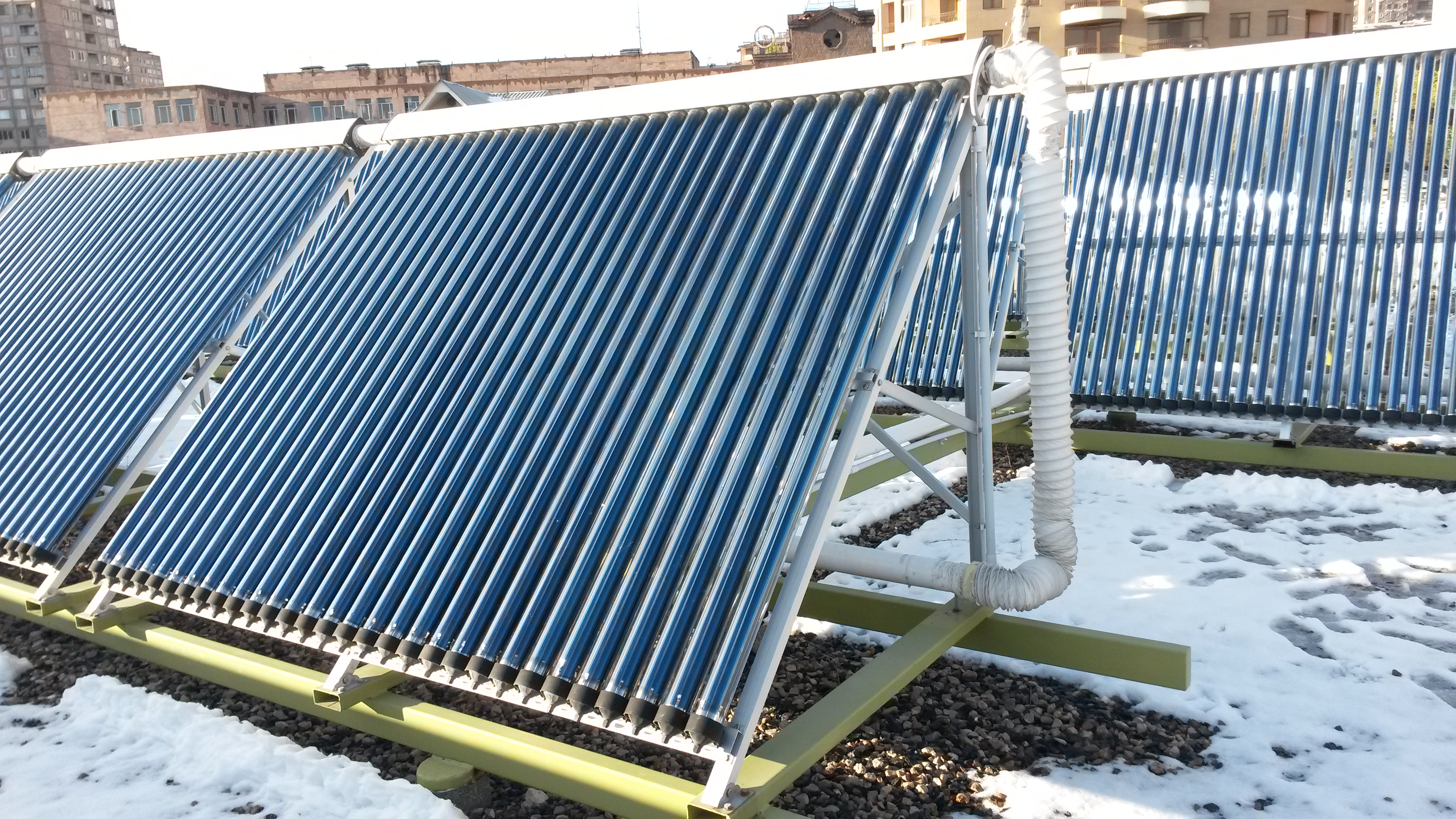
Solar water heating system on the rooftop of American University of Armenia with maximum capacity of 35 kW

In Armenia, solar thermal collectors, or water-heaters, are produced in standard sizes (1.38-4.12 square meters). Solar water-heaters can be used for space heating, solar cooling, etc. In order to generate heat, they use solar energy from the Sun. Modern solar water֊heaters can cause water to boil even in winter․

Solar thermal collectors are used throughout the territory of Armenia. One building using solar thermal collectors is AUA, which uses solar cooling and ventilation systems. The biggest solar water-heater in Armenia is located at Diana hotel in Goris, which has 1900 vacuum tubes that provide hot water for a swimming pool with 180 cubic meter volume, and for 40 hotel rooms.

== Obstacles ==
One of the main factors preventing the development of solar energy in Armenia is the installation cost.

== See also ==
- Energy in Armenia
- Electricity sector in Armenia
- List of cities by sunshine duration
- Renewable energy
- Renewable energy in Armenia
- Renewable energy by country
