= Electricity sector in Armenia =

Electricity sector of Armenia
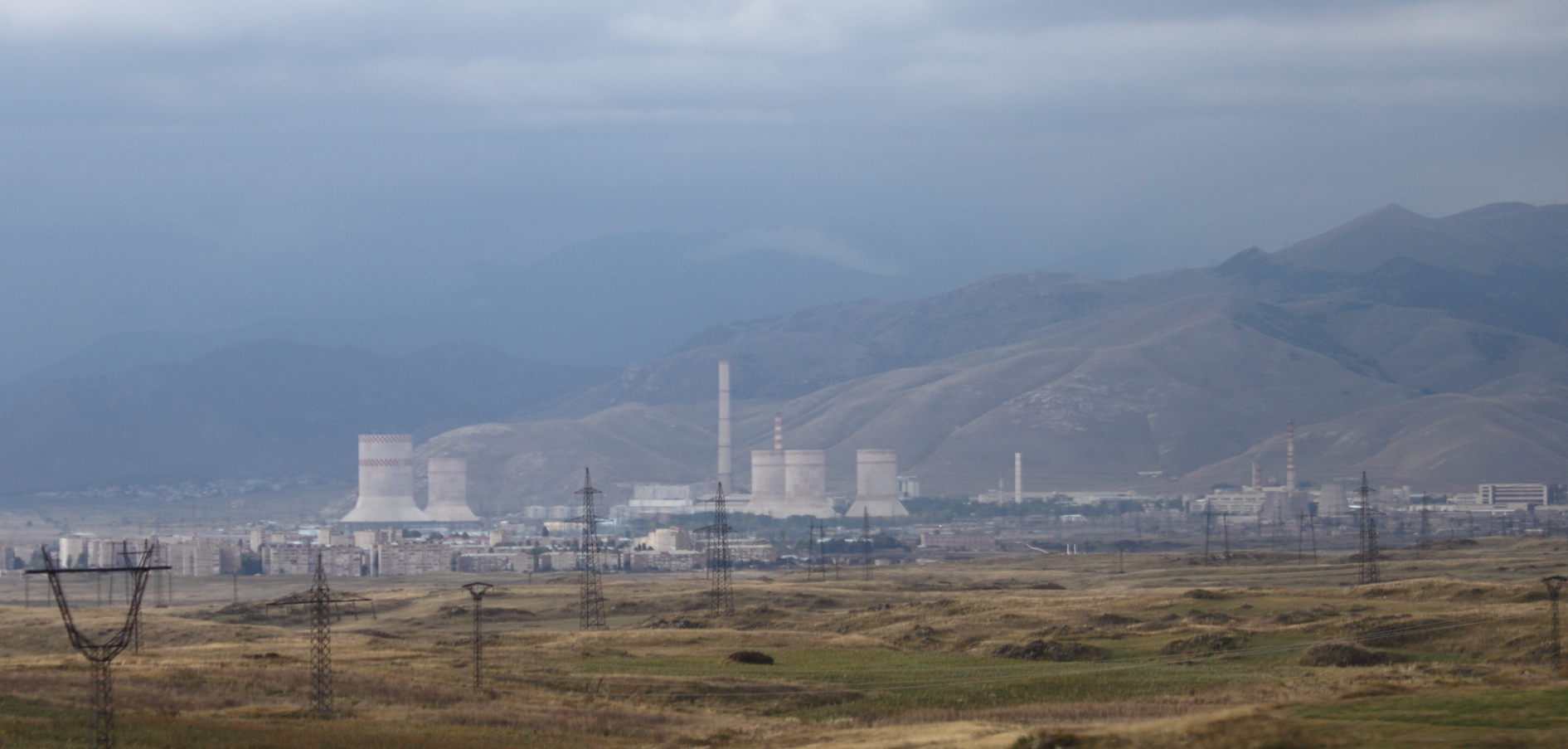

Data
- Installed capacity (2012): 3213.2 MW
- Share of fossil energy: 22.00%
- Share of renewable energy: 40.11%
- Average electricity use (2014-15): 5,352 GWh
- Distribution losses (2014-15): 11.70% (Note: Figure is the combined transmission and distribution loss.)
- Transmission losses (2014-15): 11.70% (Note: Figure is the combined transmission and distribution loss.)

Consumption by sector (% of total)
- Residential: 24.20% (2014-15)
- Industrial: 18.60% (2014-15)
- Commercial and public sector: 12.50 (2014-15)

Institutions
- Responsibility for regulation: Public Services Regulatory Commission of Armenia
- Responsibility for policy-setting: Ministry of Energy Infrastructures and Natural Resources of Armenia
- Responsibility for renewable energy: Armenia Renewable Resources and Energy Efficiency Fund
- Renewable energy law: The Law of Armenia on Energy Saving and Renewable Energy, 2004

The electricity sector of Armenia includes several companies engaged in electricity generation and distribution. Generation is carried out by multiple companies both state-owned and private. In 2020 less than a quarter of energy in Armenia was electricity.

As of 2016, the majority of the electricity sector is privatized and foreign-owned (by Russian and American companies), which is the result of a law passed in 1998 allowing for the privatization of electricity generation and distribution in the country. Administration, government legislation, and policy of the sector is conducted by the Ministry of Energy Infrastructures and Natural Resources of Armenia. Regulation of the sector is performed by the Public Services Regulatory Commission of Armenia.

Armenia does not have any fossil-fuel reserves, so it relies on gas imports from Russia and Iran, and nuclear fuel imports from Russia, which, together, result in approximately 66% of electricity production. Armenia is a net-producer of electricity and has exported in excess of 1.3 billion kWh per year since 2014 to Iran, Georgia, and Artsakh.

Large investments have been made in the electricity sector in Armenia in the 2000s. These include the construction of the $247M combined-cycle Yerevan Thermal Power Plant completed in 2010, a $52M loan from the World Bank in 2015 to improve the reliability of electricity distribution across Armenia, and a $42M investment in 2016 by Electric Networks of Armenia to repair distribution networks.

In June 2016, the Armenian Parliament updated the law "On Energy Saving and Renewable Energy" which encourages the use of solar power in the country and allows users of solar installations of 150 kW or less to sell their excess energy back to the electrical grid.

The voltage in Armenia is 220 V AC at a frequency of 50 Hz. Armenia uses the European 2-pin C-socket and F-socket plugs.

== Installed capacity for electricity generation ==
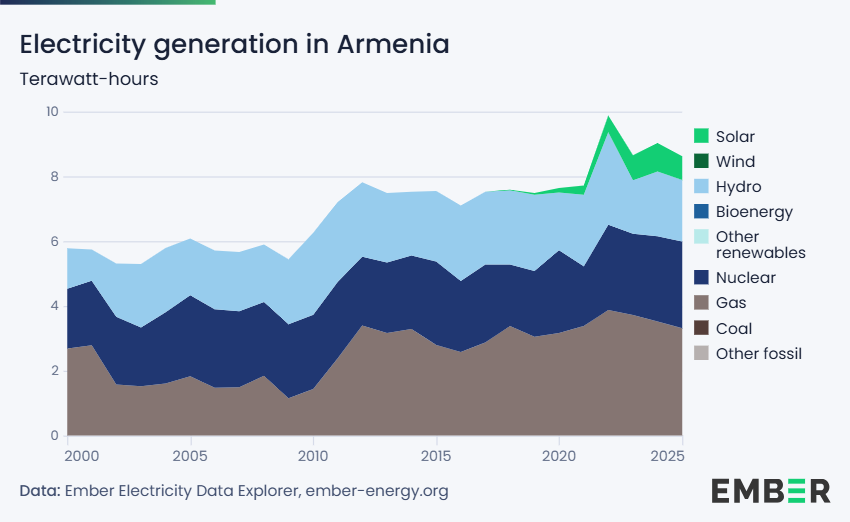
Electricity generation in Armenia in terawatt-hours

According to International Energy Agency in 2015 electricity generation in Armenia increased since 2009 to nearly 8000 GWh, but still remains below 1990 levels. Also, in 2015 Armenia consumed more than twice as much natural gas than in 2009.

Armenia lacks fossil energy source, and heavily relies on the production of electricity from a nuclear power plant and hydro power plants, and uses imported fossil fuels to operate thermal power plants. Solar energy and wind energy productions are just a small portion of the overall electricity production.

Out of 3213.2 MW of installed capacity in Armenia, the largest portion of electricity generation comes from Metsamor Nuclear Power Plant at 38%, 33% from hydro power plants, 22% from gas-fired power plants, and the remaining 7% from other renewable sources. Similar figures are derived from reports published by Electric Networks of Armenia - during the period of 01.01.2012 - 30.06.2017 breakdown of aggregated electricity supply was: nuclear - 35.8%, hydro - 35.6%, fossil gas - 28.5%.

The base loaded capacity is provided by the Metsamor Nuclear Power Plant, while the daily load regulation is provided by both the Sevan-Hrazdan Cascade and the Vorotan cascade hydropower plants. The aforementioned power plants are the primary domestic production energy sources while fossil fuel plants depend on imported gas.

== Nuclear power ==
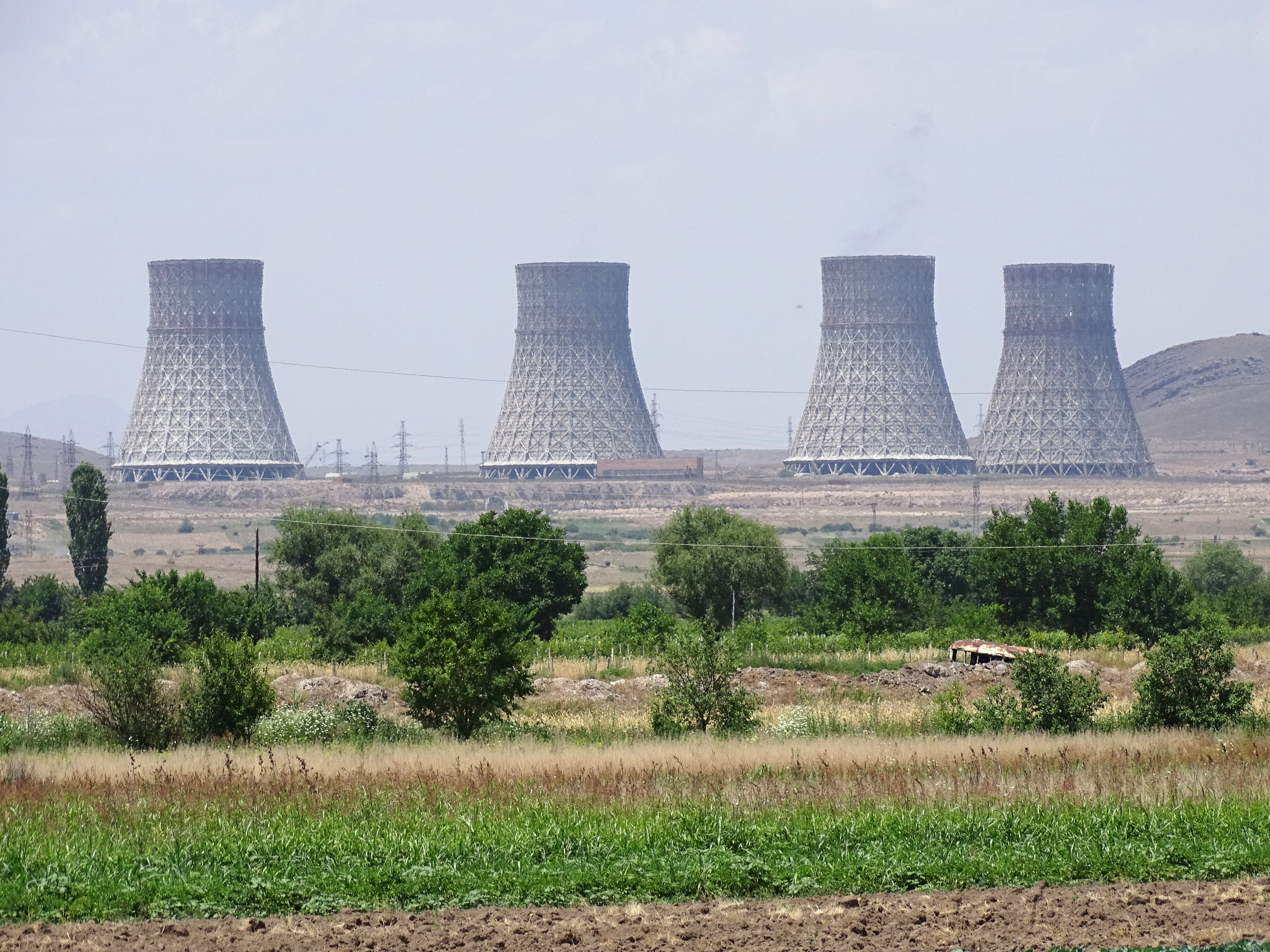
Cooling towers of the Metsamor NPP

Nuclear power provides 38% of the electricity in Armenia through the Metsamor Nuclear Power Plant, which has an installed capacity of 815 MW, though only one unit of 407.5 MW is currently in operation. The running unit is a WWER-440 reactor with extra seismic reinforcement. It was created in 1976 and is the only nuclear power plant in the South Caucasus. However, after the Spitak earthquake in 1988, the nuclear power plant's operation was forced to stop, becoming one of the causes of the Armenian energy crisis of 1990's. The second unit of the NPP was restarted in October 1995, putting an end to the 'dark and cold years'.

While Armenia is the sole owner of the plant, the Russian company United Energy Systems (UES) manages the Metsamor NPP. Because Turkey, despite its WTO obligation, blockades Armenian borders, nuclear fuel is flown in from Russia.

Despite its significance in Armenia's national grid, Metsamor NPP is aging and will need to be replaced soon. It has received much financing for modernizing its systems and safety features. Russia has extended a loan of $270 million and a $30 million grant for extending the lifetime of Metsamor NPP in 2015, which will be coming to an end in 2016. The funds are to be provided for 15 years with a 5-year grace period and an interest rate of annually 3%.

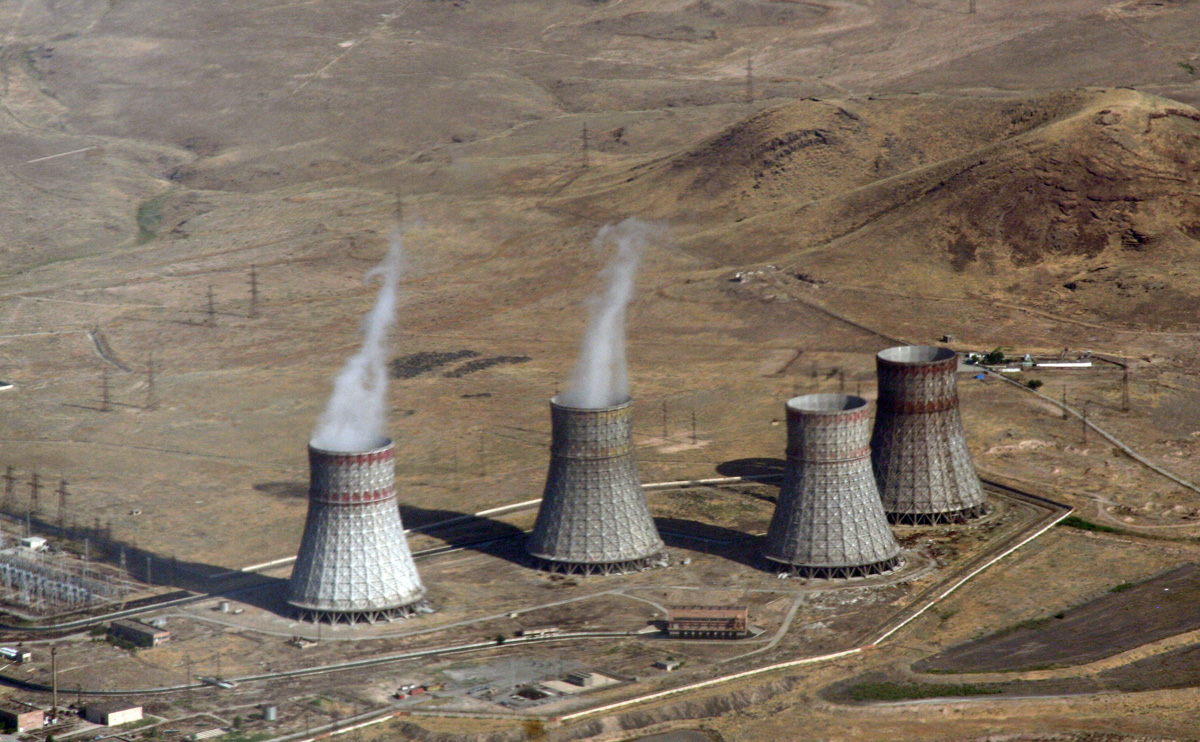
Armenia's Metsamor Nuclear Power Plant

Armenia signed a cooperation agreement with the European Organization for Nuclear Research in March 1994. Since 2018, Armenia has also had a cooperation agreement with the European Atomic Energy Community.

Plans for building a new nuclear power plant have been discussed. In July 2014, the energy minister of Russian Federation announced that Russia is willing to provide US$4.5 billion out of US$5 billion needed for construction of a new nuclear power plant. In 2026, Armenia decided its new nuclear power plant will be a small modular reactor, and proposals from Russia, United States, China, South Korea and France will be considered, with a final decision made by 2027.

== Fossil gas power ==
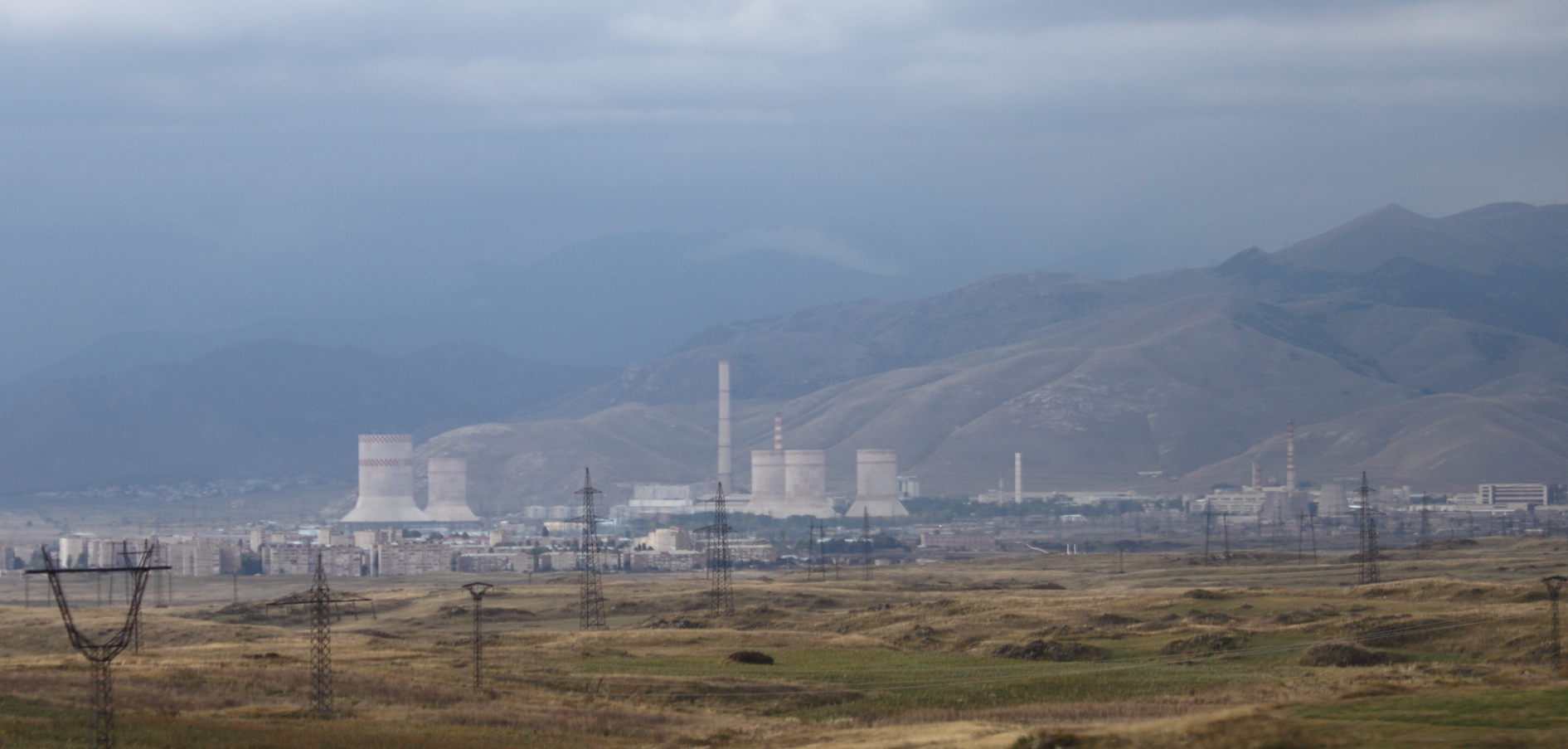
The Hrazdan Thermal Power Plant in central Armenia

During 2010–2017 thermal power plants (running on imported natural gas from Russia and Iran) provided about one-third of Armenia's electricity.

Thermal power plants (running on natural gas) in Armenia have an established capacity of 1,756 MW.

The following table lists thermal power plants which together account for 24% of Armenia's domestic electricity generation.

| Plant | Year built | Operational capacity (MW) | 2019 electricity generation (GWh) | Ownership |
|---|---|---|---|---|
| Hrazdan Thermal Power Plant | 1966–1974; 2012 | units 1-4: 1,110; unit 5: 480 | 467 (units 1-4); 378 (unit 5) | units 1-4: Hrazdan Power Company, owned by the family of Samvel Karapetyan; unit 5: Gazprom Armenia |
| Yerevan Thermal Power Plant | 1963–1967 | 550 | 1087 | |

In April 2010, a new natural gas-fired thermal power plant was inaugurated in Yerevan, making it the first major energy facility built in the country since independence. The plant will reportedly allow Armenia to considerably cut back on use of natural gas for electricity production, because officials say it will also be twice as efficient as the plant's decommissioned unit and four other Soviet-era facilities of its kind functioning in the central Armenian town of Hrazdan. With a capacity of 242 megawatts, its gas-powered turbine will be able to generate approximately one-quarter of Armenia's current (as of 2010) electricity output. The state-of-the-art plant was built in Yerevan in place of an obsolete facility with a $247 million loan provided by the Japanese government through the Japan Bank for International Cooperation (JBIC). The long-term loan was disbursed to the Armenian government on concessional terms in 2007.

Armenia's energy sector will expand further after the ongoing construction of the Hrazdan thermal plant's new and even more powerful Fifth Unit. Russia's Gazprom monopoly acquired the incomplete facility in 2006 as part of a complex agreement with the Armenian government that raised its controlling stake in the Armenian gas distribution network to a commanding 80 percent. The Russian giant pledged to spend more than $200 million on finishing its protracted construction by 2011.

The new Yerevan and Hrazdan TPP facilities will pave the way for large-scale Armenian imports of natural gas from neighboring Iran through a pipeline constructed in late 2008. Armenia began receiving modest amounts of Iranian gas in May 2009. With Russian gas essentially meeting its domestic needs, it is expected that the bulk of that gas will be converted into electricity and exported to the Islamic Republic.

In late December 2010, the Armenian Energy Ministry announced that the fifth block of the Hrazdan thermal power plant will go online by April 2011. Although construction on the fifth block began in the late 1980s, the Armenian government tried to unsuccessfully finish it in the late 1990s. The current project is part of a 2006 deal between Gazprom and the Armenian government, in which Gazprom acquired the incomplete facility and increased its stake in Armenia's gas distribution network, in turn pledging to spend $200 million in completing the project by 2011.

=== History ===
From the 1960s, the USSR carried out an electricity generation plan with the intention of constructing thermal power plants in the southern regions of Armenia where fossil fuel energy resources were restricted. Construction of thermal power plants started in the energy-intensive regions of Armenia. The first power plant was constructed in Yerevan in 1960, which was followed by Vanadzor Thermal Power Plant in 1961, and Hrazdan Thermal Power Plant in 1963.

The main source of energy for these power plants was natural gas which was delivered through pipelines running from Turkmenistan through Azerbaijan. Until the late 1980s, Armenia was heavily dependent on thermal and nuclear energy production. During the years of the first Nagorno-Karabakh War, the energy production of the thermal power plants was also stopped because of a border blockade, and Armenia had a severe energy crisis until the mid-1990s. However, Armenia managed to overcome this crisis. Although most of the technology of some of the thermal power plants is outdated as of December 2016, a lot of upgrades and maintenance have been undertaken on the power plants. The Vanadzor Thermal Power Plant is not operational as of December 2016.

There were two operational thermal power plants as of December 2016: The Hrazdan Thermal Power Plant with an installed capacity of 1100 MW, and the Yerevan Thermal Power Plant with an installed capacity of 250 MW. The 5th unit of the Hrazdan TPP with installed capacity of 450 MWt was commissioned on December 2, 2013. Hrazdan Thermal Power Plant, which is owned by the Russian Federation, produced 12.3% of the electricity produced in Armenia in 2014.

By 2016 upgrades made to the Yerevan Thermal Power Plant had increased its efficiency to almost 70% by reducing the consumption of fuel, sulfuric acid, and caustic soda, and by reducing emission levels. For its power production, it uses natural gas supplied from Iran and exchanges it with the electricity produced by the plant, while using the surplus energy for domestic consumption. On November 29, 2021 a new combined heat and gas power plant with installed capacity of 250 MW was launched in Yerevan.

== Renewable energy resources and installations ==
Armenia does not possess large fossil energy resources like coal, gas, or oil. However, according to a report by the Danish Management Group, Armenia has a large potential for renewable energy.

Armenia has set a target to generate 26% of its domestic power from renewable resources by 2025.

Renewable energy resources in Armenia
| Technology type | PV | Wind | Geothermal | Small hydro | Solar thermal | Heat pumps | Biofuel |
|---|---|---|---|---|---|---|---|
| Capacity | >1000 MW | 300-500 MW | 25 MW | 250-300 MW | >1000 MW | >1000 MW | 100,000 tons/year |

=== Hydro power ===
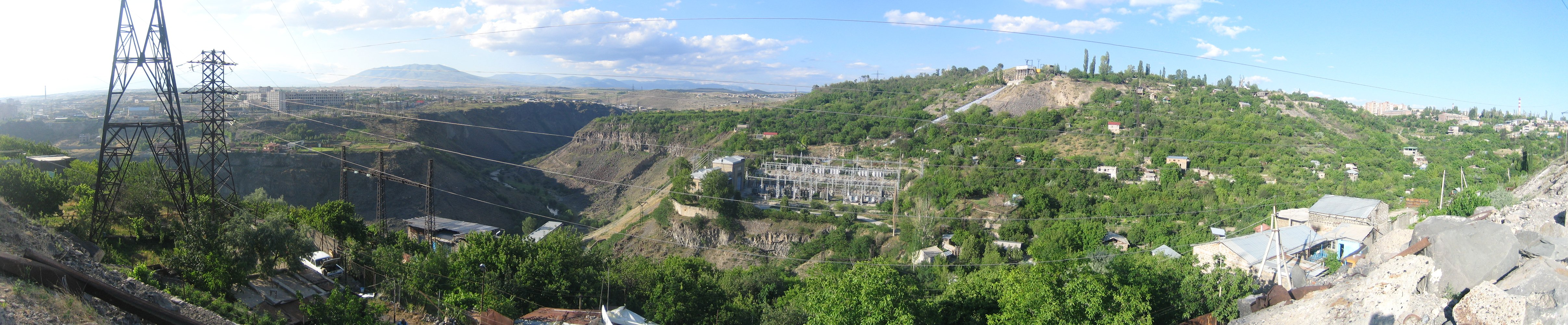
The Kanaker hydroelectric power plant along the Hrazdan river just north of Yerevan's Arabkir district

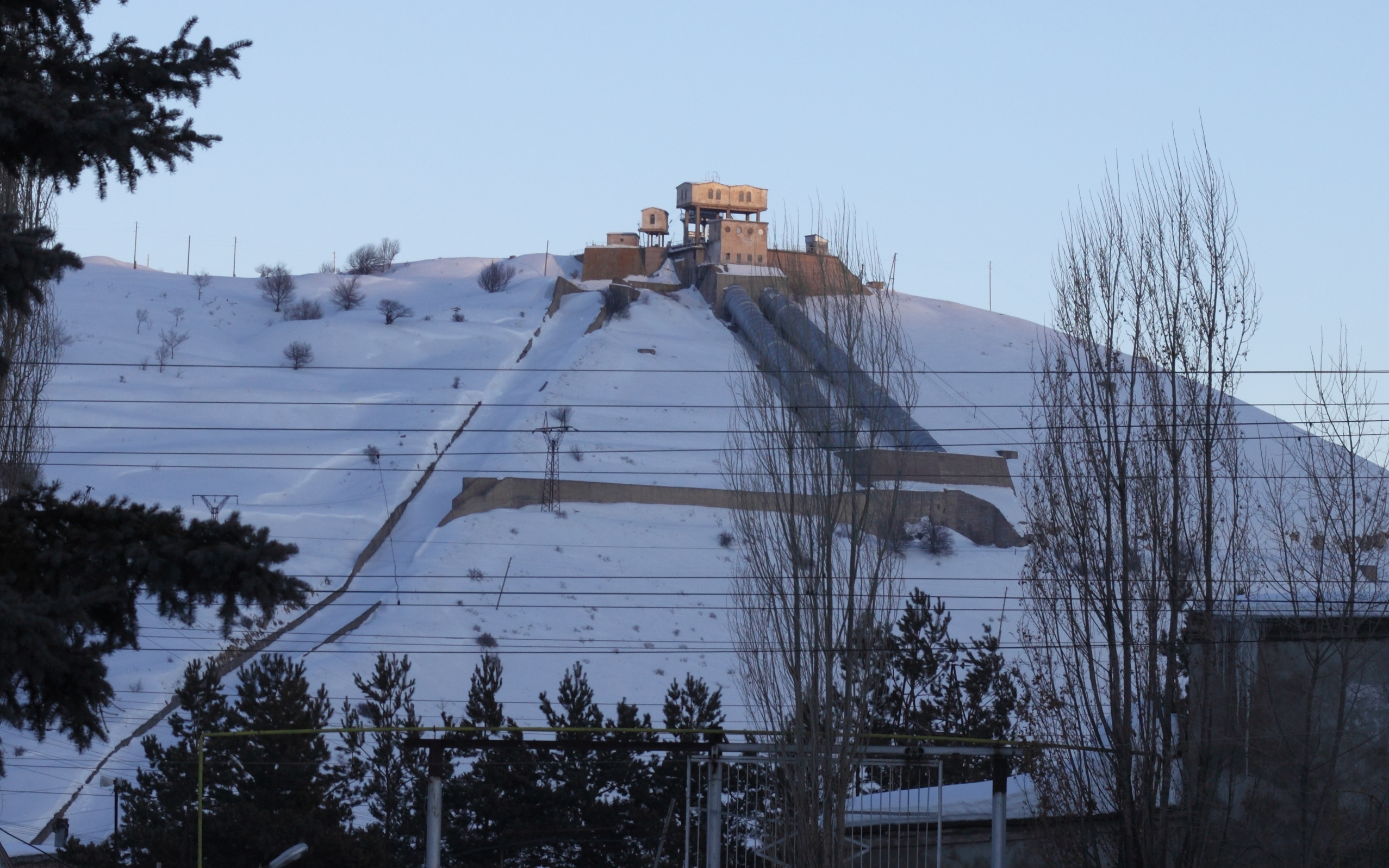
The Atarbekyan Hydro Power Plant in Hrazdan

Hydropower generates about 30% of Armenia's electricity but its share varies a lot from year to year.

Hydro power plants provide 70 percent of Armenia's renewable energy. Major HPP capacities are installed within Sevan-Hrazdan Cascade and Vorotan Cascade. The hydropower potential of Armenia is reported to be 21.8 billion kWh.

As of 1 January 2018, electricity was generated by 184 small HPPs, with total installed capacity of 353 MW. In 2017 the generation of the electricity from small HPPs was around 862 million kW*h, which is about 11% of the total generated electricity in Armenia (7762 million kW*h). As of 1 January 2018, and according to the provided licenses, 36 additional SHPPs are under construction, with about total projected 69 MW capacity and 250 million kW*h electricity annual supply.

The economically justified hydropower potential of Armenia is around 3.600 GWh/year. From this amount, 1.500 GWh/year (or about 42% of economically justified hydropower potential) has been developed already. Six of the plants are in the enclave of Nagorno-Karabakh.

=== Solar energy ===
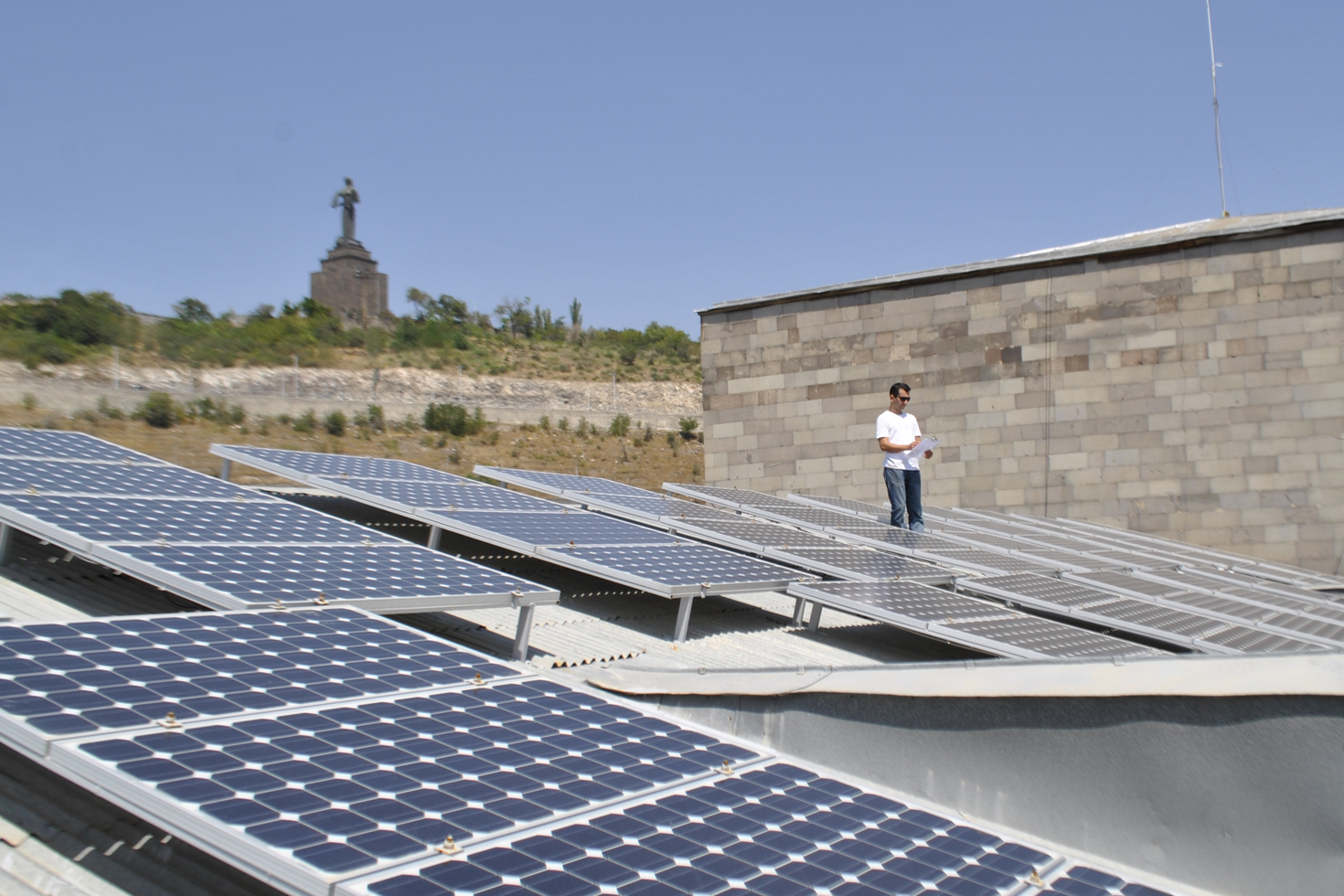
Solar panels at Armenian National Agrarian University, Yerevan

Solar energy is widely available in Armenia due to its geographical position and is considered a developing industry. In 2022 less than 2% of Armenia's electricity was generated by solar power.

The use of solar energy in Armenia is gradually increasing. In 2019, the European Union announced plans to assist Armenia towards developing its solar power capacity. The initiative has supported the construction of a power plant with 4,000 solar panels located in Gladzor.

Solar power potential in Armenia is 8 GW according to the Eurasian Development Bank. The reason for this is that average solar radiation in Armenia is almost 1700 kWh/m^{2} annually. One of the well-known utilization examples is the American University of Armenia (AUA) which uses it not only for electricity generation, but also for water heating. The government of Armenia is promoting utilization of solar energy.

In 2018 the amount of solar power produced in Armenia increased by nearly 50 per cent. Government figures show that Armenia's solar power average is 60 per cent better than the European average.

In March 2018 an international consortium consisting of the Dutch and Spanish companies won the tender for the construction of a 55 MW solar power plant Masrik-1. The solar power station is planned to be built in the community of Mets Masrik of the Gegharkunik region entirely at the expense of foreign investments. The expected volume of investments in this generation facility will be about $50 million. Construction of the plant was expected to be completed by 2020. In May 2019 the deadline for start of financing the Masrik-1 solar power plant construction project has been extended by 198 days.

=== Wind power ===
Wind power generates less than 1% of Armenia's electricity annually, as there were only four wind farms in 2023 and less than 10 MW is installed.

According to a study sponsored by the United States Department of Energy (DOE) and the United States Agency for International Development (USAID) in 2002–2003, the theoretical wind power potential of Armenia is 4,900 MWe in four zones with a total area of 979 km^{2}. According to this research, the wind energy potential in Armenia is close to 450 MW. The most promising areas for wind power plants are Zod pass, Bazum Mountain, Jajur pass, the territory of Geghama Mountains, Sevan Pass, Aparan, the highlands between Sisian and Goris, and the region of Meghri.

A reassessment by the Asian Development Bank was expected to be completed by 2025.

== Electricity consumption ==

- Industry /2016/: 140.2 ktoe (30.6%)
- Residential households: 159.5 ktoe (34.8%)
- Commercial/public services: 140 ktoe (30.6%)
- Agriculture: 9.9 ktoe (2.2%)
- Transport: 8.6 ktoe (1.9%)

- Industry /2014/: 1,479 GWh (18.6%)
- Residential: 1,924 GWh (24.2%)
- Commercial/public: 997 GWh (12.5%)
- Agriculture/forestry: 172 GWh (2.2%)
- Transport: 115 GWh (1.4%)
- Exports: 1,314 GWh (16.5%)
- Electricity sector's own use: 361 GWh (4.5%)
- Losses: 929 GWh (11.7%)
- Unspecified: 665 GWh (8.4%)

According to Armstat total final consumption of electric energy in 2016 amounted to 458.2 ktoe and was broken down as presented on the graph to the right.

In 2014, Armenia consumed 5352 GWh of the total 7956 GWh of electricity production (7750 GWh domestic production and 206 GWh imports). This is approximately 67.3% of the total. The biggest consumer was the residential sector (1924 GWh, ~24.2%).

World Bank data referring to International Energy Agency demonstrates that in per capita terms electricity consumption in Armenia remains below world average and in 2014 only matched 1992 figure.

== Electricity transmission and distribution ==
Distribution is controlled by Electric Networks of Armenia (ENA), High Voltage Electrical Networks, and Electro Power System Operator. There are over 36,000 km of distribution lines across Armenia.

In 2002, Electric Networks of Armenia (ENA) was privatized by Midland Resources Holding. 100% of ENA shares were sold to Midland Resources Holding company. Revenues of Electric Networks of Armenia amounted to 181 billion AMD in 2018, less from 191 billion in 2017.

Transmission and distribution losses remain high in Armenia, even compared to Russia.

A World Bank survey from 2013 reveals companies would experience a power outage only about 4 times a year (at par with countries like Hungary and Latvia).

=== International interconnectors ===
There are interconnectors to Georgia and Iran. It has been suggested that if the Black Sea Energy submarine cable is built there could be exports to the EU too.

== Financial aspects ==
=== Exports ===
For three kilowatt hours of electricity Iran pays a cubic metre of gas.

=== Supplier tariffs ===
Electricity supplier tariffs and supply shares
| Supplier | Owned by | Supply price in AMD / kW*h (without VAT) as of August 1, 2016 | Total supply share 01.01.2012 - 30.06.2017 | Total supply share 2018 | Total supply share 2019 |
|---|---|---|---|---|---|
| Armenian Nuclear Power Plant CJSC | Republic of Armenia | 5.647 | 35.8% | 31,5% | 31,6% |
| Yerevan TPP CJSC | Republic of Armenia | 15.459 | 11.7% | 16,9% | 16,5% |
| Contour Global Hydro Cascade (owns Vorotan HPP Cascade) | U.S. company ContourGlobal | 6.656 | 15.1% | 15,3% | 14,9% |
| Hrazdan TPP OJSC (owns first-fourth power blocks) | Tashir Group, owned by Samvel Karapetian | 31 | 9.7% | 7,2% | 4,8% |
| Gazprom Armenia CJSC (owns fifth power block of Hrazdan TPP) | Russian state company Gazprom | 25.388 | 7.1% | 5,9% | 7,6% |
| International Energy Corporation CJSC (owns Sevan-Hrazdan HPP Cascade) | Tashir Group, owned by Samvel Karapetian | 8.411 | 7.6% | 6,4% | 6,7% |
| Small stations | various | 21.856 | 12.7% | 14,9% | 16,7% |
| Artsakhenergo CJSC | United Energy Company | 22.486 | 0.3% | | |
| Energoimpex CJSC | Republic of Armenia | 15.459 | 0.1% | 1,9% | 1,2% |

Electricity supplier prices are determined by the Settlement Center of Ministry of Energy Infrastructures and Natural Resources of Armenia.

Solar installations of 150 kW or less are allowed to sell their excess energy back to the electrical grid.

| Solar stations or a class thereof | Yearly production | Location | Owner | Supply price |
|---|---|---|---|---|
| <0.5 MW | | | divers, 360 stations with 10MW in total, no license required | Supply prices in AMD for solar stations |
| 1 MW | | location | divers, licensed | 42.6 |
| 2 MW | | near Shoghakat in Gegharkunik | Das Enteria Solarkraftwerk (was to be completed in 2020) | 28 (incl. VAT) |
| 55 MW Masrik-1 | 128 GWh | near Mets Masrik in Gegharkunik | Fotowatio Renewable Ventures (Netherlands) and FSL Solar S.L. (Spain) (in construction, commissioning projected in 2024) | 20.11 (US$0,0419) w/o VAT |
| 200 MW Ayg-1 | | near Talin and Dashtadem in Aragatsotn | tender bid by Masdar (U.A.E.) Armenia | 14.45 (US$0.0299) bid |
| 200 MW Ayg-2 | | in Kotayk | (projected) | |

In February 2018, the Armenian parliament adopted a set of amendments and additions to the Law on Energy and other related laws, designed to liberalize the national energy market, specify the functions of the responsible government agencies and regulator, and protect the interests of consumers.

Reports published by Electricity Networks of Armenia have highlighted that Yerevan Thermal Power Plant, which is modernized with funding from Japanese and European technologies, is much more energy-efficient than the older Thermal Power Plant in Hrazdan, and therefore sells electricity to the grid at half the price (15.5 AMD vs. 25 / 31 AMD). Despite this however, the plant is not utilized to its full capacity, with a greater proportion of electricity acquired from less efficient TPPs in Hrazdan, owned by Gazprom and Tashir Group, which sell more expensive electricity, resulting in higher overall prices for consumers. Electricity Networks of Armenia is also owned by Tashir Group.

Supplier tariffs are more favorable for producers of electricity from renewable sources. At the beginning of 2019, rates (excluding VAT) were:

- Electricity tariff for power supplied from SHPP that are built on natural water streams was 23.805 AMD / kW·h.
- Electricity tariff for power supplied from SHPP that are built on irrigation systems was 15.867 AMD / kW·h.
- Electricity tariff for power supplied from SHPP that are built on natural drinking sources was 10.579 AMD / kW·h.
- Electricity tariff for power supplied from wind farm was 42.739 AMD / kW·h.
- Electricity tariff for power generated from biomass was 42.739 AMD / kW·h.
- Electricity tariff for power generated from solar photovoltanic installation was 42.739 AMD / kW·h.

=== Consumer tariffs and billing ===
Electricity consumer tariffs from February 1, 2019
| Consumer | AMD/kWh (incl. VAT) |
|---|---|
| 110 kV (daily) | 33.48 |
| 110 kV (nightly) | 29.48 |
| 35 kV (daily) | 35.98 |
| 35 kV (nightly) | 31.98 |
| 6 (10) kV (daily) | 41.98 |
| 6 (10) kV (nightly) | 31.98 |
| General population 0.22-0.38 kV (daily) | 44.98 |
| General population 0.22-0.38 kV (nightly) | 34.98 |
| Socially insecure population 0.22-0.38 kV (daily) | 29.99 |
| Socially insecure population 0.22-0.38 kV (nightly) | 19.99 |

Electricity tariffs are dependent on the time of day (night/day), and the voltage supplied to the customer. Tariffs are determined by the Public Services Regulatory Commission of Armenia while wholesale prices are determined by the Settlement Centre CJSC and submitted to Electric Networks of Armenia.

There were protests (Electric Yerevan) from June to September 2015 over a price increase for electricity, which was increased by 6.93 AMD per kilowatt-hour (AMD/kWh) (~US$0.015/kWh) to 39.78 AMD/kWh (~US$0.0830). After protests prices were decreased from August 1, 2016, by 2.58 AMD/kWh (~US$0.0054) from 48.78 AMD/kWh (~US$0.1018) to 46.2 AMD/kWh (~US$0.0964).

By the end of December 2018 further decrease of tariffs by 10.01 AMD per kWh for socially insecure population was announced.

Large consumers (not households) can switch suppliers.

==== Subsidies ====
Depending on the amount of electricity consumed, the Government of Armenia subsidizes electricity bills of consumers who utilize less than 500 kWh of electricity per month.

==== Billing ====
Customers are billed monthly in kWh. Bills can be paid at physical locations such as Haypost (the Armenian post office), banks, payment terminals, and electronically via mobile apps, SMS, and via the Internet.

=== Funding ===
ENA's benefit (Electric Networks of Armenia) from low-rate state-loans amounted to 3.77 billion AMD in 2018 and 4.0 billion AMD in 2019.

ENA received a loan from the World Bank in 2016 to pay debts owed to electricity producing companies in Armenia, primarily the Metsamor Nuclear Power Plant and the Yerevan Thermal Power Plant.

== Future plans and investments ==
There are numerous investment opportunities in the sector as Armenia has significant potential for electricity production from renewable energy sources such as hydropower, wind, solar, geothermal, and biogas.

Armenia also has a large solar energy potential. Compared with other countries, the average annual energy flow is higher; therefore, there is large interest in this energy sector.

In May 2018 deputy minister of energy infrastructure and natural resources mentioned that the electricity market liberalization process began and a local production of solar panels kicked off. He said that it is planned to make the solar energy share reach at least 10% in the energy sector by 2022. 314 solar power stations with up to 500 kW capacity are connected to the electricity network in Armenia, while 85 other solar power stations are in the stage of connection with a total capacity of 5.2 MW. 4 systemic solar stations are connected to the network, 7 are in the construction phase with completion planned within this year with the total capacity is 10 MW. Nearly 600 families are already using solar energy in non-gasified communities under state funded projects alone.

In July 2015, a US$58 million investment project was launched, which was designed to help the renewable energy sector. This project included plans for solar power stations of 40-50 MW capacity.

In April 2019 it was announced that German company Das Enteria Solarkraftwerk will build a 2 MW strong solar station near Shorzha at lake Sevan by end of 2020.

=== Energy efficiency ===
In 2012, US$1.82 million was invested by International Bank of Reconstruction and Development in an energy saving program. The program planned to upgrade the insulation of public buildings and heating systems, which included replacing traditional lamps with LEDs, and installing solar water heating panels. On 30 June 2016 the project's grant component had been completed.

== See also ==
- Electric Yerevan
- Energy in Armenia
