= Ministry of Energy Infrastructures and Natural Resources (Armenia) =

Government ministry of Armenia

- Էներգետիկ ենթակառուցվածքների և բնական պաշարների նախարարություն
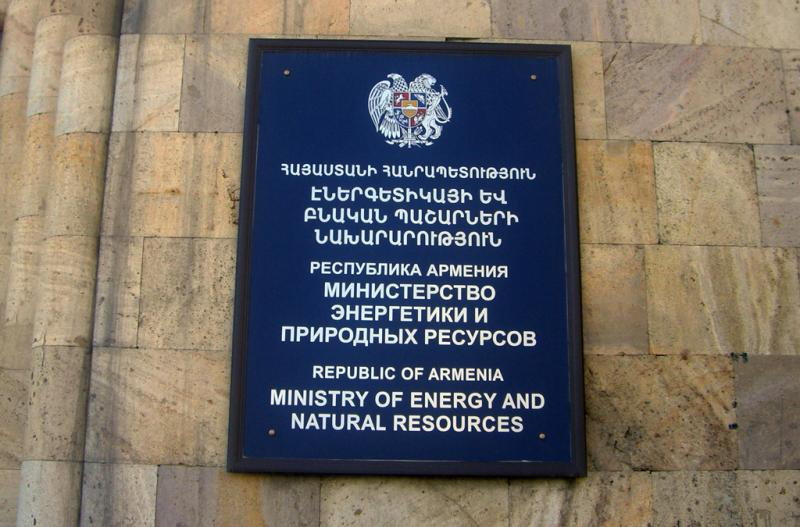

Agency overview
- Formed: 1992 as Ministry of Energy and Fuel of the Republic of Armenia
- Jurisdiction: Government of Armenia
- Headquarters: Yerevan
- Minister responsible: Minister of Energy Infrastructures and Natural Resources
- Website: www.minenergy.am

Ministry of Energy Infrastructures and Natural Resources logo

The Ministry of Energy Infrastructures and Natural Resources of Armenia (Armenian: Հայաստանի Էներգետիկ ենթակառուցվածքների և բնական պաշարների նախարարություն) is the ministry responsible for the management of the energy systems, and control of the exploitation of natural resources in Armenia. It elaborates and implements the policies of the Government of Armenia in the energy sector.

Its history can be traced to the time that Armenia was part of the Soviet Union. Since that time, many ministers have changed, as well as, the official name of the ministry, although maintaining the word 'energy' in its name throughout. As of 2016, it is one of the 18 ministries in Armenia, and plays an important role in regulating the laws and policies regarding the energy and natural resource spheres.

== History ==
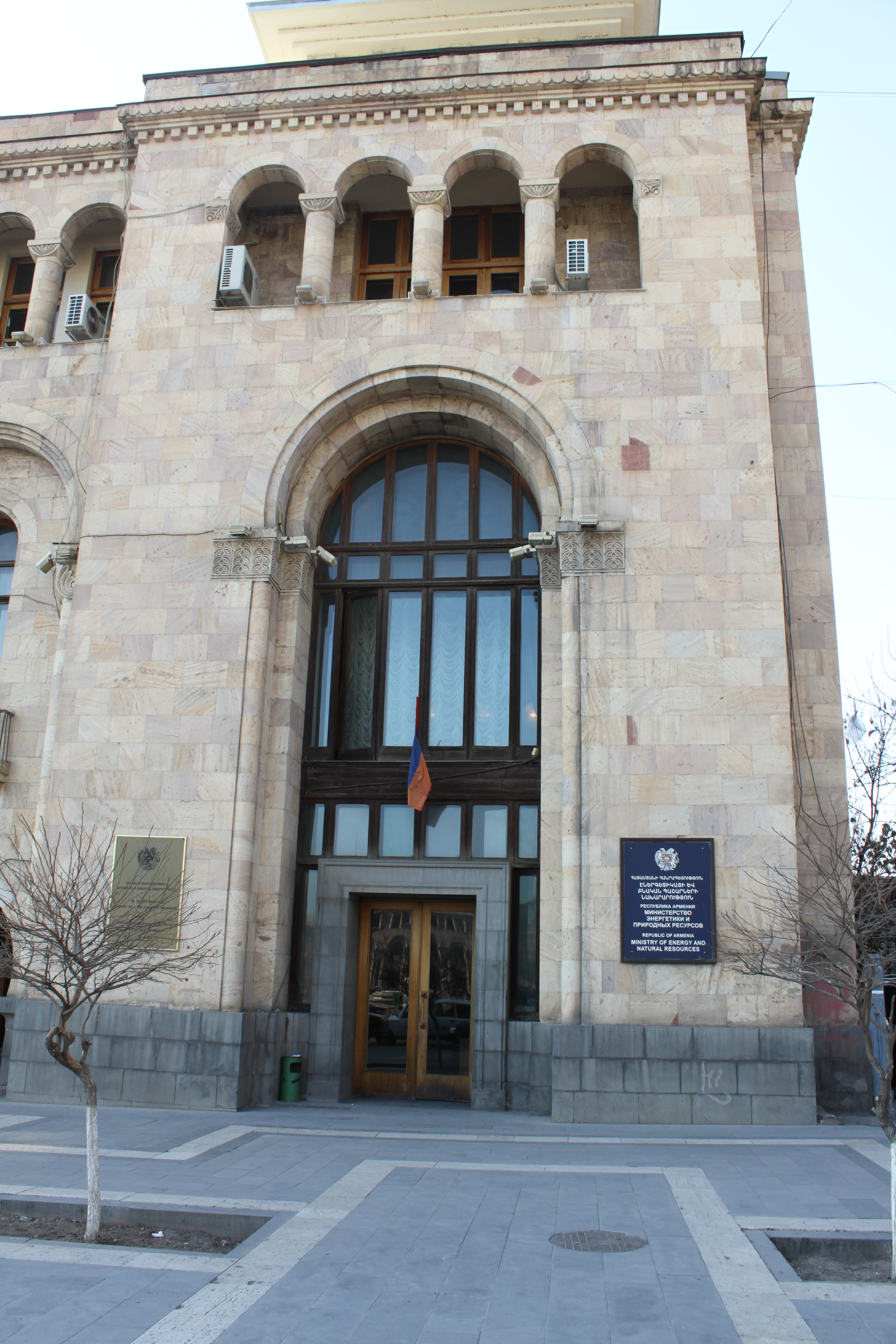
Building of the Ministry of Energy Infrastructures and Natural Resources

The Armenian energy system has a 100-year history, during which time the ArmEnergo department played an important role. ArmEnergo was formed in November 1936 by the decision of the Soviet Union, with the aim of managing and controlling the exploitation and development of electric stations and networks. The two hydropower plants of Yerevan, the Gyumri HPP, Dzora HPP and other technical services were part of ArmEnergo. Later on, ArmEnergo became the official body eligible to control the entire energy system of Armenia.

Following the collapse of the Soviet Union in 1991, Armenian economic reforms, and dawn of an energy crisis, Armenia required new control mechanisms. In order to overcome this, in 1992 the Ministry of Energy and Fuel of the Republic of Armenia was established. The ministry was renamed as the Ministry of Energy of The Republic of Armenia on 4 August 1995 by a decision of the Armenian government. Once more, the ministry was renamed as Ministry of Energy and Natural Resources of The Republic of Armenia by a decree of the Armenian president on 18 April 2008, and once more renamed as the Ministry of Energy Infrastructures and Natural Resources of The Republic of Armenia on 30 September 2016. Today, the main aim of the ministry is to develop and maintain the governance policy of Armenia in the sphere of energy infrastructures and natural resources.

== Structure ==
Ashot Manukyan is the current Minister, and the Deputy Ministers are Areg Galstyan, Iosif Isayan, Hayk Harutyunyan, and Vardan Gevorgyan.

The structure of the ministry is as follows:

- The Minister
- Deputy Ministers
- Ministry staff
- Staff of the Minister
- State non-profit organizations
- Companies governed by ministry
- Public Agencies Operational in the System of Governance of the Ministry

List of energy ministers
Name	Portrait	Party	Term of Office		Prime Minister (Cabinet)
Minister of Energy and Fuel
Sepuh Tashchean			1992	1993	Khosrov Harutyunyan
Mels Hakobyan		Independent	16 February 1993	30 April 1993	Hrant Bagratyan
Hrayr Hovhannisyan			3 May 1993	21 July 1993	Hrant Bagratyan
Miron Shishmanyan			21 July 1993	26 July 1995	Hrant Bagratyan
Minister of Energy
Gagik Martirosyan		RPA	26 July 1995	17 November 1998	Hrant Bagratyan, Armen Sarkissian, Robert Kocharyan, Armen Darbinyan
Meruzhan Mikaelyan			17 November 1998	15 June 1999	Armen Darbinyan
Davit Zadoyan		RPA(later PANM)	15 June 1999	20 May 2000	Vazgen Sargsyan, Aram Sargsyan
Karen Galustyan			20 May 2000	4 December 2001	Andranik Margaryan
Minister of Energy and Natural Resources
Armen Movsisyan		RPA	4 December 2001	30 April 2014	Andranik Margaryan, Serzh Sargsyan, Tigran Sargsyan
Yervand Zakharyan		RPA	30 April 2014	29 February 2016	Hovik Abrahamyan
Levon Yolyan		Independent	29 February 2016	20 September 2016	Hovik Abrahamyan
Minister of Energy Infrastructures and Natural Resources
Ashot Manukyan		Independent	20 September 2016	12 May 2018	Karen Karapetyan, Serzh Sargsyan
Artur Grigoryan		Prosperous Armenia	12 May 2018	3 October 2018	Nikol Pashinyan
Garegin Baghramyan		Independent	4 October 2018	23 January 2019	Nikol Pashinyan

== Natural resources ==
The mining sector is a very important part or Armenia’s national economy. Ore concentrates and metals are the main goods exported from Armenia, making up about half of all exported goods. About 670 mines are officially registered, of which more than half (around 400 mines) are exploited.

The ministry reports that there is an abundance of iron, copper, molybdenum, lead, zinc, gold, silver, antimony, aluminum, and also other types of minerals and metals in Armenia. Metal mineral mines include 7 copper-molybdenum mines, 4 copper mines, 14 gold and gold-polymetallic mines, 2 polymetallic mine, 2 iron ore mines, and 1 aluminum mine.

As a result of volcanic processes, mountainous rocks were formed. Notable ones are light rocks (tufa, perlite, pumice-stone, zeolite, scoria). In addition, different types of basalts, granites, nephelite syenite, and marble make up a large percent of resources in Armenia.

== Energy sources ==
While being surrounded by countries that have significant hydrocarbon reserves, Armenia does not have enough fossil fuels and coal to be able to use them for producing energy. As such, Armenia is totally dependent on fuel that is imported from abroad as a fuel source for transportation, generating energy, and producing heat. Research shows that Armenia has some fossil fuel reserves which are mostly located near Gyumri and Spitak, but they are located so deep that it is not economically feasible to extract them.

In the 1990s, during the energy crisis, Armenia succeeded in constructing a large energy system. However, compared with 1988, when the energy generated capacity was more than 3.5 gigawatts, in 2010 it was just 1.2 gigawatts, which can be explained by the Armenian Government's decision to close some of the thermal power plants and one of the 2 reactors at the Metsamor Nuclear Power Plant. As a result, Armenia has started utilizing various renewable energy sources.

== Energy security ==
The concept of energy security in Armenia is aimed at ensuring the conformity with the provisions set out in the National Security Strategy of Armenia. Energy security is a system of political, economic, legal, organizational, methodological, and other activities that provide affordable prices to meet the daily needs of high-quality and reliable power supply, as well as in emergency situations, such as during periods of war.

Armenia has adopted a sustainable development policy which implies the development of the energy sector as the most important area. This sector's aim is to ensure the kind of progress that will create preconditions for the harmonization and balance of environmental issues for sustainable development of the next generation, while reducing energy loss. Because of Armenia's limited hydrocarbon resources, energy security has become imperative for the presence of energy resources, including the balance of renewable energy sources.

Since there are no fossil fuel resources in Armenia, the function of Ministry of Energy Infrastructures and Natural Resources of Armenia is to increase energy efficiency in the economy, develop nuclear energy, and efficiently use renewable energy resources.

The adoption of the concept of energy security is due to:

1. The regional and international political and socio-economic rapid development, global economic crisis, as well as Armenia's energy independence, security in times of emergency and war.
2. Proper engagement of Armenia in regional programs that are implemented in the region by the European Union, Russia, the United States and other international organizations.
3. The importance of creating a long-term strategic reserves of fuel and other energy resources.

== Strategic plans ==
Strategic plans of the ministry are based on a three-level diversification policy:

1. Generation of energy (HPPs, NPPs, TPPs, and other power plants)
2. Energy supply (fuel supply), such as natural gas, oil and other fuels
3. Fuel and energy transportation: natural gas delivery by pipelines, oil product delivery and other related transportation

The three-level diversification policy's aim is to provide a sufficient level of energy security, to have electricity and gas consumption reserves in emergency situations. In the framework of this policy, there are programs to neutralize internal and external threats, including the extension of the Armenian Nuclear Power Plant, and for the construction of new cost-effective electricity generating facilities.

== Achievements of the ministry ==
=== Construction of new generating capacities ===
- Yerevan Combined Cycle Gas Power Plant: This project was completed in 2013. Through this project, Iranian and Armenian economic efficiency increased.
- Hrazdan N5 Combined Cycle Gas Turbine, with an installed capacity of 440 MW: This project was accomplished in December 2013, which was implemented within the framework of agreement between the Government of Armenia and Gazprom.

=== Regional integration ===
- Armenia and Georgia signed the Parallel Operation Agreement, in which Armenia and Georgia agree to provide power to each other during emergency situations.
- Armenia and Georgia accepted the investigation of interconnection transmission lines with establishment of a substation with a back-to-back converter at an overall power of 1,050 MW, and marked Amendment N2 to the New Transmission Line Construction Agreement on April 16, 2014.

== Investment Projects ==
The Ministry of Energy Infrastructures and Natural Resources of Armenia has continuous goals to contribute to the development of the energy sector in Armenia. Thus, every year, it seeks to accomplish new projects in the field of renewable energy in conjunction with various international companies and investors.

== See also ==
- Energy in Armenia
- Electricity sector in Armenia
