= Armenian Nuclear Power Plant =

Nuclear power plant near Yerevan, Armenia

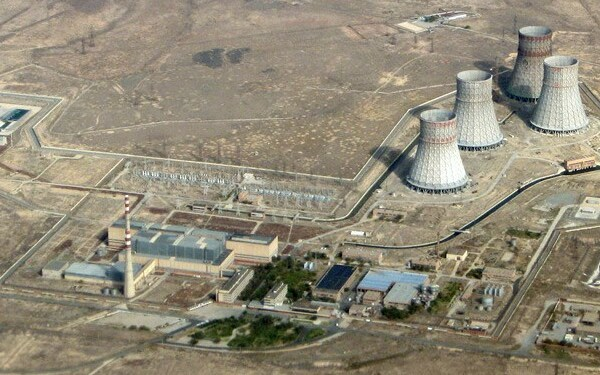
- Country: Armenia
- Coordinates: 40°10′51.04″N 44°8′56.07″E
- Status: Operational
- Construction began: 1969
- Commission date: 22 December 1976
- Operator: Haykakan Atomayin Electrakayan CJSC

Nuclear power station
- Reactor type: VVER-440 Model V-270
- Thermal capacity: 1,375 MWt

Power generation
- Units operational: 1 x 440 MW (gross)
- Units decommissioned: 1 x 408 MW (gross)
- Nameplate capacity: 375 MW
- Annual net output: 2,265 GW·h

External links
- Website: armeniannpp.am
- Commons: Related media on Commons

The Armenian Nuclear Power Plant (ANPP) (Armenian: Հայկական ատոմային էլեկտրակայան, romanized: Haykakan atomayin e'lektrakayan), also known as the Metsamor Nuclear Power Plant, (Armenian: Մեծամորի ատոմային էլեկտրակայան) is the only nuclear power plant in the South Caucasus, located 36 kilometers west of Yerevan in Armenia.

The ANPP complex consists of two VVER-440 Model V270 nuclear reactors, each capable of generating 407.5 megawatts (MW) of power, for a total of 815 MW. The plant supplied approximately 40 percent of Armenia's electricity in 2015.

As with other early VVER-440 plants, and unlike Western pressurized water reactors (PWR), the ANPP lacks a secondary containment building.

== History ==
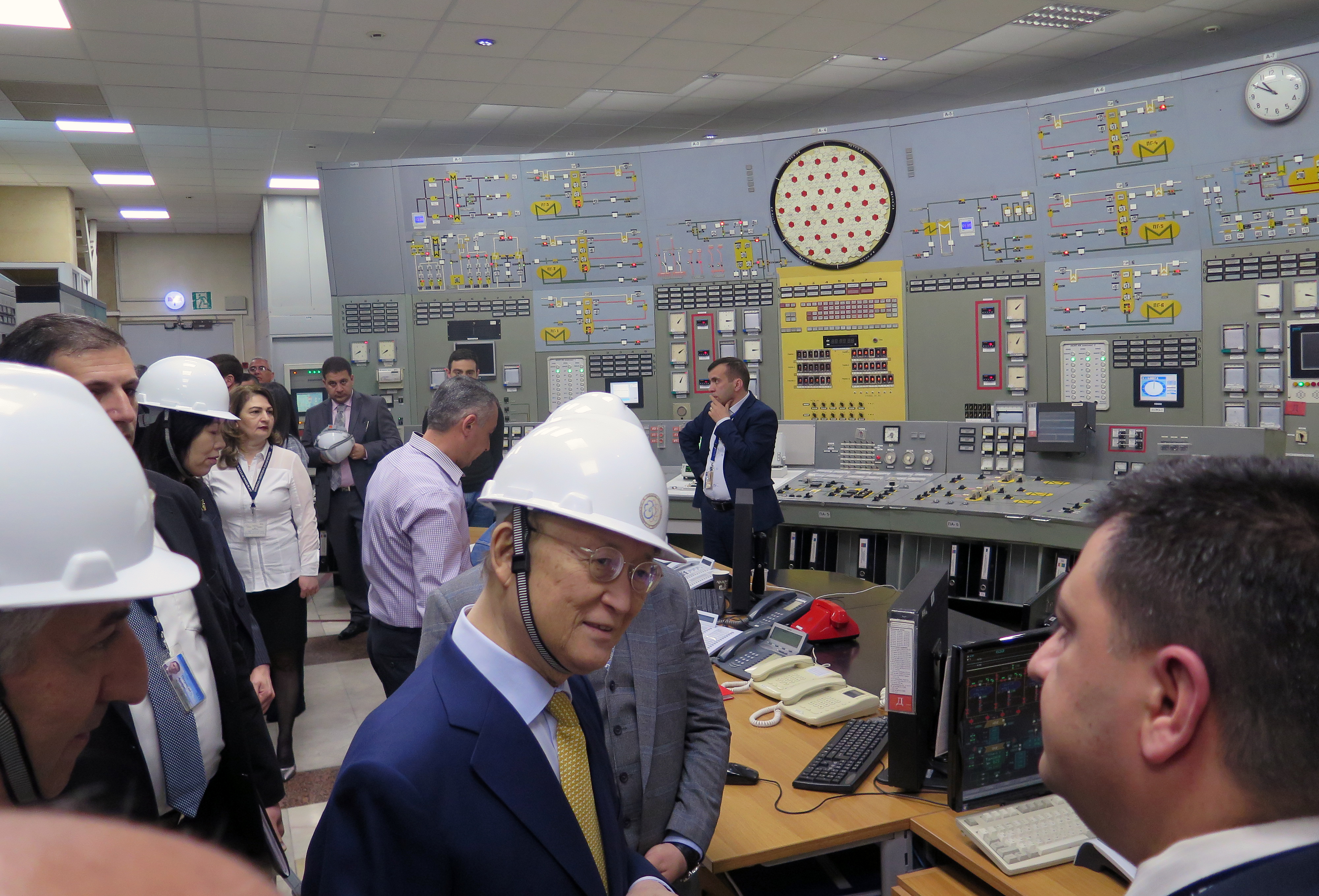
IAEA Director General Yukiya Amano visiting the control room in 2019

The ANPP complex consists of two units. The first unit was activated on 22 December 1976, and the second on 5 January 1980. Following public pressure after the Spitak Earthquake in 1988, the Council of Ministers of the Soviet Union decided to shut down the existing two units.

After the fall of the USSR, Armenia had a period of energy scarcity and the government decided to reopen the plant. Ahead of the reopening, the Armenian government invited leading international companies to discuss and recommend solutions for potential earthquakes. After lengthy discussions, they developed a solution with Russian help and subsequently unit 2 restarted on 5 November 1995, six years after being shut down. This resulted in large increases in the Armenian generation capacity, allowing power to be used day and night.

ANPP is operated by CJSC HAEK (Closed Joint Stock Company Armenian Atomic Power Plant), according to the ratification of the Republic of Armenia on the usage of nuclear energy. The principal goal of this company has been stated to be the ability to produce safe and cost-efficient energy.

=== Unit 2 developments ===
The EU reportedly had classified the VVER 440 Model V230 light-water-cooled reactors as the "oldest and least reliable" category of all the 66 Soviet reactors built in Eastern Europe and the former Soviet Union. However the IAEA has found that the Metsamor NPP has adequate safety and can function beyond its design lifespan.

In December 2008, the Armenian government's progress in meeting international safety standards regarding its use of nuclear energy at the Metsamor NPP was praised by Council on Nuclear Energy Safety Chairman Adolf Birkhofer, who also praised the overall development of the energy system in the country.

In the wake of Japan's 2011 Fukushima nuclear crisis, the combination of design and location of Metsamor was again claimed to make it among the most dangerous nuclear plants in the world. The Metsamor power station is one of the few remaining nuclear reactors of its kind that were built without primary containment structures. Armenian authorities and nuclear experts have also dismissed the possibility of a repeat of Fukushima, citing numerous safety upgrades the plant has received since one of its reactors was restored into operation in 1995.

In October 2015 a life extension of unit 2 was agreed, mostly funded with a loan from Russia, permitting it to operate until 2026. The work will include modernization of the turbine hall equipment enabling unit 2's power output to increase by 15-18%.

In August 2021 the reactor's pressure vessels underwent thermal annealing procedure by Russia's Federal Agency for Atomic Energy (Rosatom), with the goal to extend its service life until 2026. The generating capacity was also increased to 440 MW in a $40 million deal. In December 2024, after discussions by an Armenian-Russian intergovernmental commission, a decision was made to extend the life of the plant until 2036. The metal samples, identical to the metal used in the construction of the reactor vessel of the unit, were installed in the reactor and monitored by Rosatom. The unloading of samples has been scheduled for 2025 and would be carried out annually.

=== Discussions on possible third unit ===
On 23 April 2007 Director Sergei Kiriyenko of Rosatom met with Armenia's Energy Minister Armen Movsisyan and Ecology Minister, Vardan Ayvazyan, where the Russian side indicated Moscow's willingness to help Armenia build a new nuclear power plant, in the event that Armenian officials opted to head in that direction. This statement was followed by former President Robert Kocharyan's speech given to Yerevan State University students on 27 April 2007 during which he said that serious work on the fate of Armenia's atomic energy is underway and practical steps will be taken in this direction in 2008–2009. The president considered it desirable to construct a new nuclear power plant based on the existing infrastructures and new technologies. However, in his words, it is necessary to determine the amount needed and examine what impact it will have on rates. Robert Kocharyan said that in 2012–2013, active work will be carried out to build a new nuclear power plant and modernize the current one.

Armen Movsisyan has also announced that a decision to build a new unit at the operating nuclear power plant to replace the one to be decommissioned has been taken. The new unit would support 1,000 MW, which would "not only meet the needs of Armenia and reduce the country's dependence on organic energy [gas, oil, etc.] considerably but will also have certain energy importance in the region." A feasibility study for building a new reactor at the Metsamor nuclear power plant is underway with the assistance of foreign specialists. This work is expected to be completed within 1–2 years. Another proposed idea would be to have the unit support 1,200 MW. The cost of the project will go upwards from $4 billion to 5.2-7.2 billion depending on the power of the plant. Armenian Deputy Minister of Energy and Natural Resources Areg Galstyan said that the construction of the new nuclear power plant may start in 2011. The new NPP was expected to be commissioned in 2017. The United States has backed plans for a new Armenian Nuclear Plant and has pledged to help the Armenian government conduct feasibility studies needed for the implementation of the multimillion-dollar project. On 29 November 2007, the Armenian government approved a plan to shut down the nuclear power plant, but gave no specific date. According to Energy Minister Armen Movsisyan, the shutdown could cost up to $280 million.

In February 2009, the government announced a tender for a new 1000 MWe unit. In May 2009, Australian company Worley Parsons was chosen to administer the project, and a $460 million management contract was signed in June. Legislation providing for the construction of up to 1200 MWe of new nuclear capacity at Metsamor from one or more reactors was passed in June 2009. In December 2009, the government approved the establishment of JV Metzamorenergoatom, a 50-50 Russian-Armenian joint stock company set up by the Ministry of Energy and Natural Resources with Atomstroyexport, with shares offered to other investors. This will build a 1060 MWe AES-92 unit (with a VVER-1000 model V-392 reactor) with a service life of 60 years at Metsamor. In March 2010 an agreement was signed with Rosatom to provide the V-392 reactor equipment for it. In August 2010, an intergovernmental agreement was signed to provide that the Russian party will build at least one VVER-1000 reactor, supply nuclear fuel for it and decommission it. Construction was to commence in 2012 or early 2013 and is expected to cost US$5 billion. The customer and owner of new reactors, as well as electricity generated, will be Metzamorenergoatom, and Atomstroyexport will be the principal contractor. Armenia undertakes to buy all electricity produced at commercial rates, enabling investors' return on capital, for 20 years. Metzamorenergoatom is to fund not less than 40% of the construction, and early in 2012, Russia agreed to finance 50%. The latest date for commissioning is 2019–20.

As of 2015, construction of a new nuclear unit was still being considered, though plans were delayed due to the Fukushima crisis. A medium power design of about 600 MWe is now the preferred option.

By 2023, the Ministry of Territorial Administration and Infrastructure was weighing the choice of Russian dual 1200MW, 1000/1400MW South Korean, French, or American small modular reactor designs. The Armenian government intended to select a capacity by year-end 2023. Under an agreement with Russia, construction work was predicted to begin by the end of 2024 or early 2025.

In 2026, Armenia decided its new nuclear power plant will be a small modular reactor, and proposals from Russia, United States, China, South Korea and France will be considered, with a final decision made by 2027.

== Reactors ==
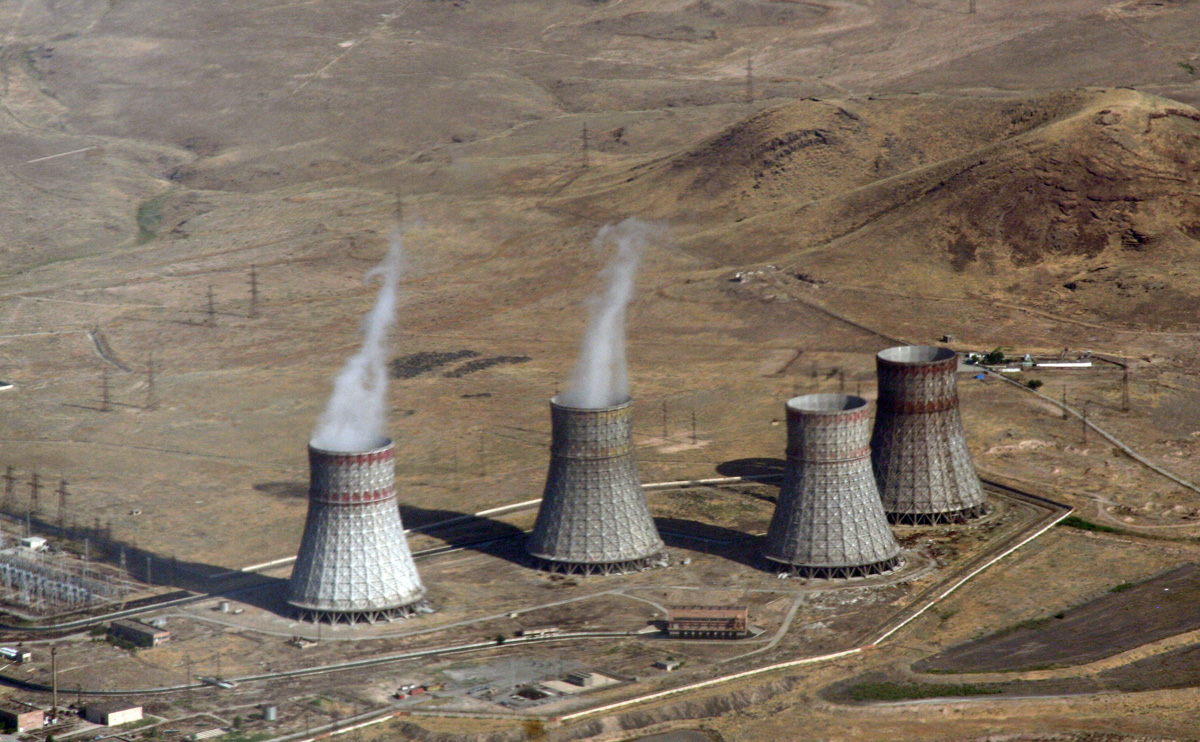
Cooling towers of Metsamor

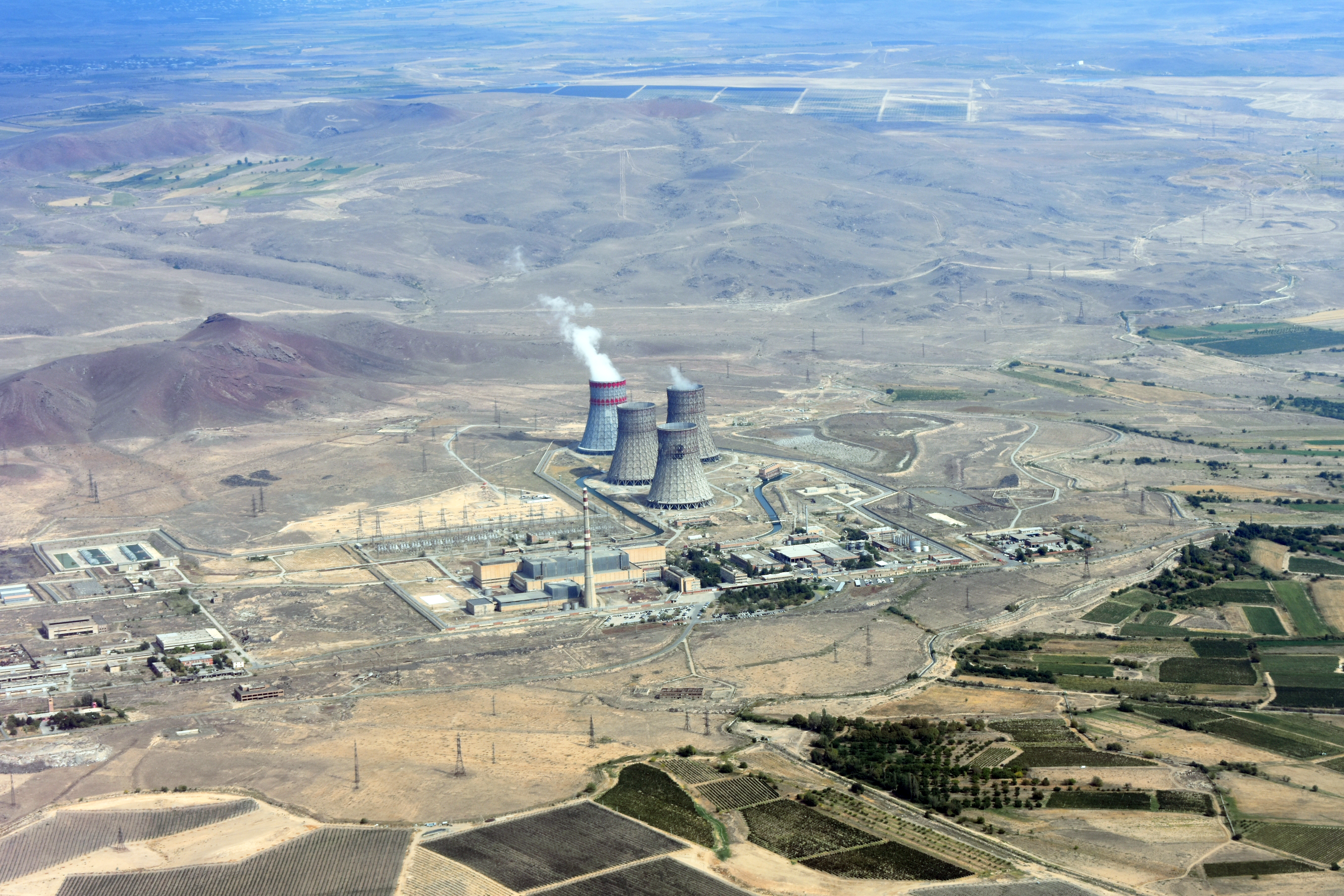
An aerial view

Unit	Type	Net El. Output (MW)	Gross El. Output (MW)	Start of project	First criticality	Shut down
Armenia-1	VVER-440 Model V270	376 MW	407.5 MW	1 July 1969	22 December 1976	25 February 1989
Armenia-2	VVER-440 Model V270	376 MW	407.5 MW	1 July 1975	5 January 1980	expected in 2036

The International Atomic Energy Agency (IAEA) contributed to the developments and improvements of the plant. Armenia signed a contract with Russia to modernize the plant and extend the lifespan until 2036.

=== Main technical and economical performance indicators ===
	2003	2004	2005	2006	2007
Power generation (bln. KWh)	1,997	2,402	2,716	2,640	2,553
Capacity factor (%)	60,80	72,94	82,69	80,37	77,73
Availability factor (%)	83,09	76,87	84,24	84,60	80,97

== Safety concerns ==
=== Earthquake resistance ===
The plant lies close to an area prone to earthquakes with magnitudes up to 8. However, the plant was only constructed to resist earthquakes with a magnitude of up to 7.

=== Environmental concerns ===
As the Metsamor Plant is near Turkey, 16 km from the border, its environmental issues are of great significance for Turkey as well. Moreover, the European Union is also concerned with this issue. Previously, there were various proposals to shut down the plant, but as it is of great importance for Armenia, the Armenian government decided that it will continue operating until a new one is built.

Hakob Sanasaryan, an Armenian chemist and environmentalist campaigner and head of the Green Union of Armenia, claimed in 1996 that the Metsamor Nuclear Power Plant did not meet internationally accepted nuclear safety standards, due to the lack of a containment vessel.

=== Military threats by Azerbaijan ===
On 16 July 2020, during the border clashes with Armenia, Vagif Dargahli, spokesperson of Azerbaijan's Ministry of Defense, threatened to strike the Metsamor NPP. He stated: "The Armenian side should keep in mind that our armed forces have advanced missile systems in service, capable of conducting high-precision strikes on the Metsamor Nuclear Power Plant, which may result in a huge disaster for Armenia."

Armenia's Ministry of Foreign Affairs responded that the threats "indicate the level of desperation and the crisis of mind of the political-military leadership of Azerbaijan" and called it a "flagrant violation of the International Humanitarian Law in general and the First Additional Protocol to Geneva Conventions in particular. Such threats are an explicit demonstration of state terrorism and genocidal intent of Azerbaijan."

== See also ==
- Energy in Armenia
- Electricity sector in Armenia
- List of nuclear reactors
- Nuclear energy policy by country
- Nuclear power by country
