= Black Sea Energy submarine cable =

Proposed electricity cable

The Black Sea Energy submarine cable is an proposed electricity interconnector. The proposed line would connect Anaklia, Georgia, to Constanta, Romania and would span 1,100 kilometers. A study by Italian consultancy CESI, begun in 2022 and completed at the 2024 United Nations Climate Change Conference, affirmed that phase one of the proposed construction was feasible.
