= Yerevan Thermal Power Plant =

Power station in Armenia

Yerevan Thermal Power Centre
- Official name: Yerevan TPC
- Country: Armenia
- Location: Yerevan
- Coordinates: 40°06′51″N 44°29′48″E
- Status: Operational
- Construction began: 1961 (old plant); 2007 (new plant)
- Commission date: 1963 (old plant); 22 April 2010 (new plant)
- Decommission date: 2010 (old plant)
- Owner: Yerevan TPP CJSC

Thermal power station
- Primary fuel: Natural gas
- Secondary fuel: Fuel oil
- Tertiary fuel: Coal
- Combined cycle?: Yes
- Cogeneration?: Yes

Power generation
- Units operational: 1 × 242 MW
- Units decommissioned: 5 × 50 MW; 2 × 150 MW
- Nameplate capacity: 242 MW

Yerevan Thermal Power Plant (Yerevan TPP) (Armenian: Երևանի ջերմաէլեկտրակայան (Երևանի ՋԷԿ)), is a thermal power plant located about 10 kilometres (6.2 mi) from Yerevan, Armenia. An older, obsolete plant was fueled by natural gas and fuel oil, while the new combined-cycle plant is powered by natural gas and has a capacity of 242 megawatts. It produces a quarter of the country's electricity and is responsible for seasonal electricity swaps with Iran. The director general of the power plant is Hovakim Hovhannisyan.

== History ==
=== Old thermal plant ===
The Teploelectroproject Institute began planning the Yerevan Thermal Power Plant in 1959. Construction began in 1961, and 1963 saw the commission of the first turbine, with 50 megawatts of electrical capacity. (The operating company was established at the same time.) It was the first large-scale thermal power plant in Armenia. After the last power turbine was commissioned in 1967, the plant consisted of seven units, with 550 megawatts of electrical power and 630 GCal/h of thermal capacity. Five units had electrical capacity of 50 megawatts each, and two units had electrical capacity of 150 megawatts each.

After the new plant opened in 2010, the old plant was closed. By that time, only one unit remained operational. However, there is a plan to rehabilitate two 50-megawatt units of the old plant to process coal from Nagorno-Karabakh. In 2014, equipment was installed and a small-scale test was carried out.

=== New combined-cycle plant ===
A plan to privatize the power station was reconsidered in 2003. Preparations for construction of the new combined cycle co-generation plant next to the existing plant started in 2005. The project cost US$247 million, which was covered by a ¥26,409 billion (US$241 million) loan from the Japan Bank for International Cooperation (now the Japan International Cooperation Agency). The initial loan agreement was signed on 29 March 2005, and an amendment was signed on 27 May 2008. The loan must be repaid over 40 years at an interest rate of 0.75%. The term includes a 10-year grace period in which no money is due.

The new plant was built by GS E&C (95%) and Mitsui (5%) under a turnkey contract. Tokyo Electric Power Services Company was a consultant. A gas turbine, a generator, and auxiliary equipment were supplied by Alstom. Fuji Heavy Industries supplied a steam turbine, Sedae Enertech Company supplied a heat recovery steam generator, and Honeywell supplied an automatic control system. Construction started in December 2007 and was finished in March 2010. The new plant was inaugurated by Armenian president Serzh Sargsyan on 22 April 2010.

=== Future plant ===
In 2015, it was announced that the Italian contractors Renco S.p.A. would build and operate a $285 million, 250 megawatt unit, with an up to 53% general coefficient of efficiency. The groundbreaking of the construction of the new unit took place on March 30, 2017 at the vicinity of the new combined-cycle plant, with the presence of President Serzh Sargsyan, the Director General of Renco Company Mr. Jovanni Rubini, and the Ambassador of Italy to Armenia Mr. Giovanni Ricciulli. Construction is envisaged to last between 26 and 30 months, to be concluded in the second half of 2019. The unit will allow Armenia the chance to ensure a secure and dependable supply of electric energy to the neighboring countries, turning into a major player at the energy market of the region.

== Characteristics ==
The old plant, which consisted of seven units, had 550 megawatts of electrical power and 630 GCal/h of thermal capacity. It included two К-150-130-type turbines (150 megawatts of electrical capacity each), four PT-50-130/13-type and one Р-50-130/13-type turbines (50 megawatts of electrical capacity each), two TGM-94 boilers (500 t/h of steam capacity each), and five TGM-84 boilers (420 t/h of steam capacity each).

The total installed capacity of the new plant is 271.1 megawatts, corresponding electrical capacity is 242 megawatts and thermal capacity is 434.9 GJ/h. The re-equipment of the operating unit of the Yerevan Thermal Power Plant is set to kick off in August 2018 as a result the plant's capacity is supposed to increase by about 7 MW to 227 MW, the specific fuel consumption will reduce from 258.1 g/kWh to 252.8 g/kWh, the efficiency of the power unit will increase by 1%, the useful generation of electricity will increase by 59.5 million kWh, which corresponds to more than 1.2 billion drams under the current tariff.

The GT13E2 MXL gas turbine, manufactured by Alstom, has a capacity of 179.9 megawatts, and the steam turbine, manufactured by Fuji Heavy Industries, has a capacity of 63 megawatts. The plant produces a quarter of the country's electricity. It uses Iranian gas supplied through the Iran–Armenia gas pipeline. For each cubic meter of natural gas obtained from Iran, three kilowatt hours of electricity are provided; 38% goes to Iran, while 62% is sold domestically. Construction of the new plant helped reduce the electricity production cost from 400 Armenian drams per kilowatt hours to 160–170 drams per kilowatt hour.

The plant is equipped with GT13E2 MXL gas turbines. It has 179.9 megawatts of capacity and operates in two modes with 36.4% efficiency. The steam turbine has 63 megawatts of electrical capacity and 103.7 GCal/h of heat capacity.

The new plant has 71 employees, while the old plant had 986 employees. The new plant is almost 70% more efficient than the old. Compared with the Hrazdan Thermal Power Plant, it uses half as much fuel: no more than 256 grams (9.0 oz) per kilowatt hour of electricity. Sulfuric acid emissions are tens of times lower, and nine times less nitric oxides (NO_{x}) are emitted. Carbon dioxide (CO_{2}) emissions were reduced by more than half, and emissions of carbon monoxide (CO) are about 38 times lower. Water consumption is more than three times lower.

== See also ==
- Energy in Armenia
