= Armen Movsisyan =

Armenian politician

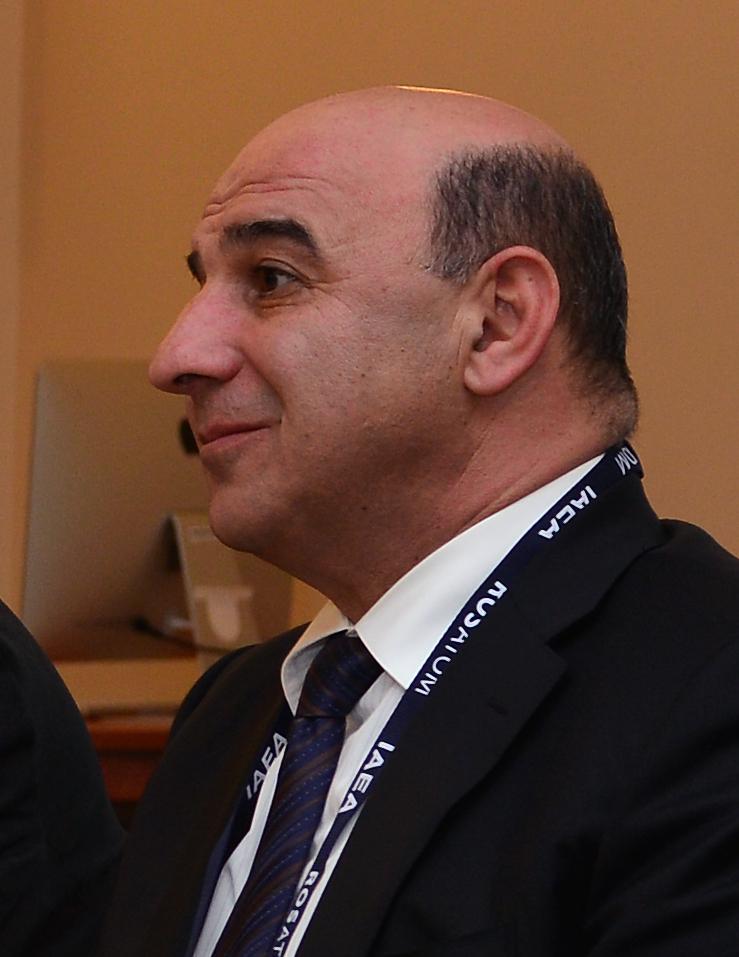
- Armen Movsisyan in 2013

Minister of Energy and Natural Resources of Armenia
- In office April 18, 2008 – April 30, 2014
- President: Serzh Sargsyan
- Preceded by: himself
- Succeeded by: Yervand Zakharyan

Ministry of Energy of Armenia
- In office 2001 – April 18, 2008
- Preceded by: Karen Galustyan
- Succeeded by: himself

Personal details
- Born: January 13, 1962 Kapan, Syunik Province
- Died: September 21, 2015 (aged 53) Germany
- Cause of death: Cancer

Armen Movsisyan (Armenian: Արմեն Մովսիսյան) (13 January 1962 – 21 September 2015) was the Minister of Energy and Natural Resources of Armenia (2001–2014).

He was born in Kapan and died from cancer on 21 September 2015 in Germany, aged 53.
