= Shoghakat, Armenia =

Village in Gegharkunik, Armenia

Shogahakat Շողակաթ
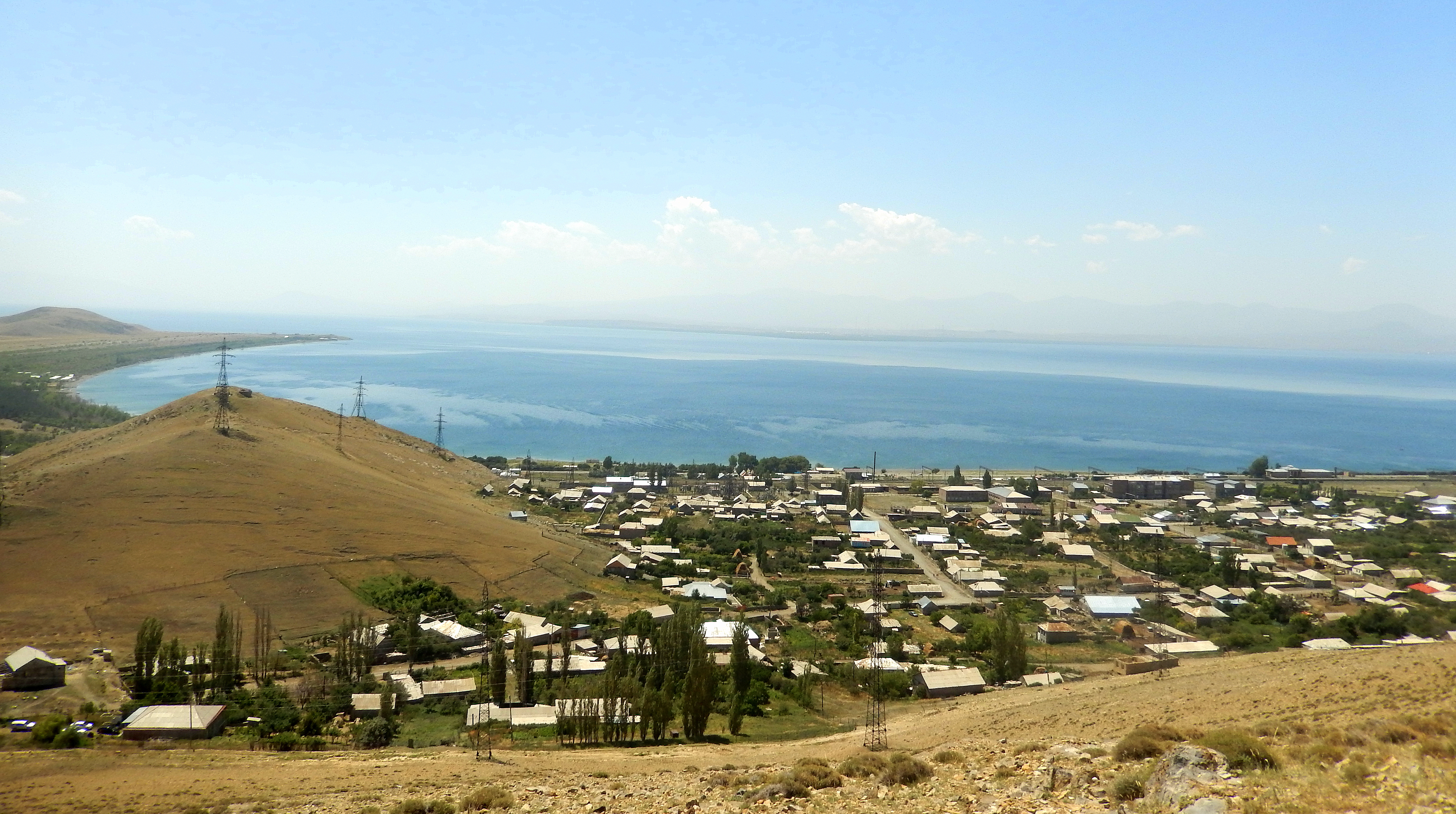
- A view of Shoghakat and Lake Sevan

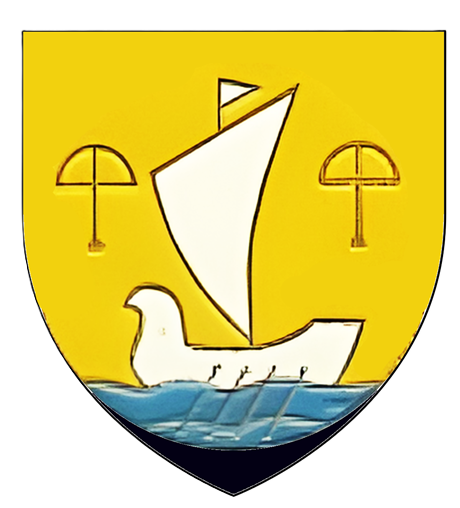
- Coat of arms

- Location within Armenia Location within Gegharkunik
- Coordinates: 40°30′04″N 45°16′28″E
- Country: Armenia
- Province: Gegharkunik
- Municipality: Shoghakat
- Elevation: 1,915 m (6,283 ft)

Population (2011)
  - Total: 509
- Time zone: UTC+4 (AMT)
- Postal code: 1316

Shoghakat (Armenian: Շողակաթ) is a village in the Shoghakat Municipality of the Gegharkunik Province of Armenia, located near Lake Sevan, northwest of the Artanish Peninsula. The village was founded in the 1810s by Mordvins exiled from Russia. In 1988-1989 Armenian refugees from Azerbaijan settled in the village.

== Toponymy ==
The village was formerly known as Nadezhdino, Shordzhalu and later Shorzha (Armenian: Շորժա) until November 2017.

== Historical sites ==
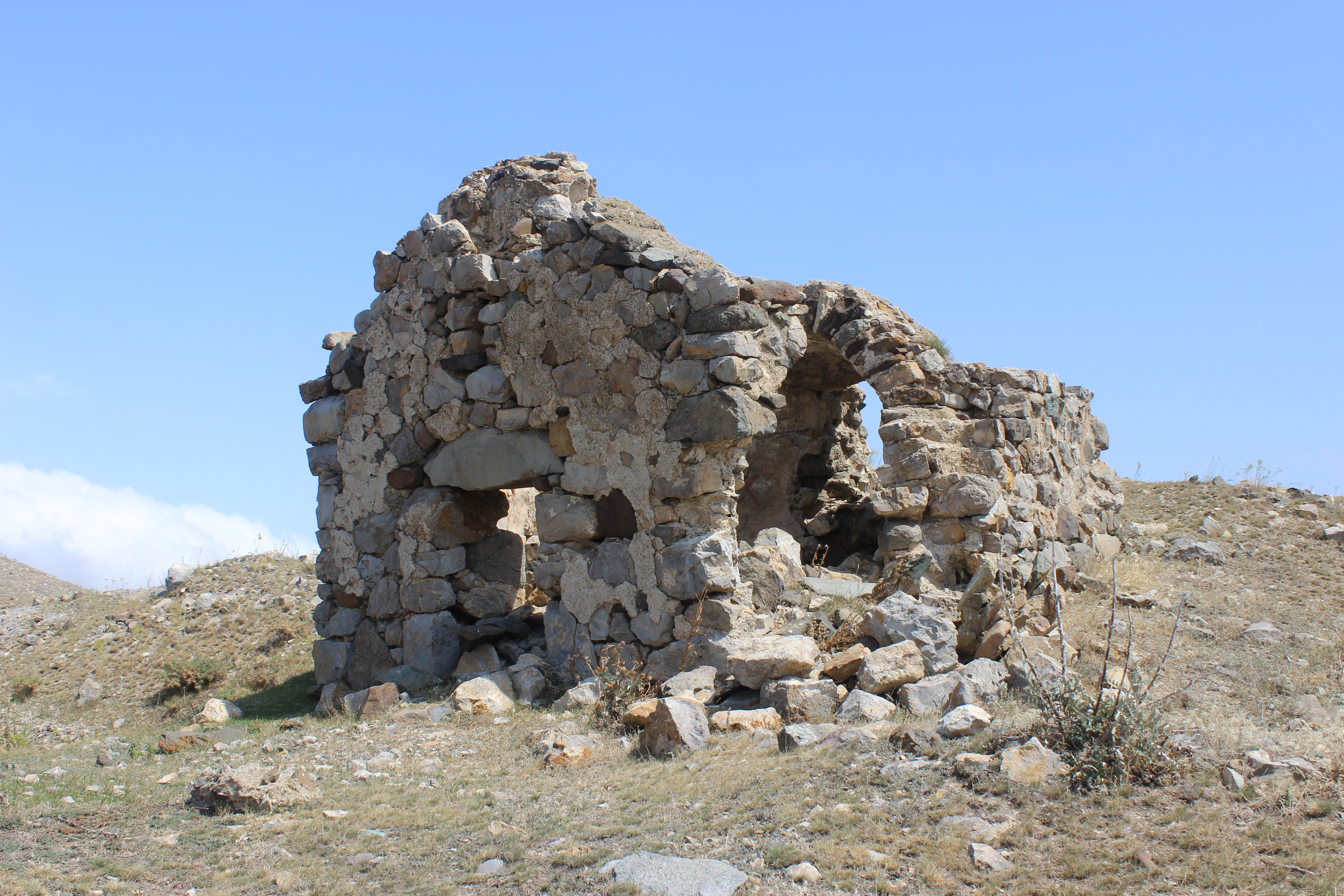
Chapel ruins atop a hill overlooking Shoghakat

A 17th-century chapel and cemetery are located along the southern outskirts of the village. On the hill overlooking Shoghakat, there are the ruins of another chapel. Remains of an Iron Age fort can be seen in same area.

== Nature ==
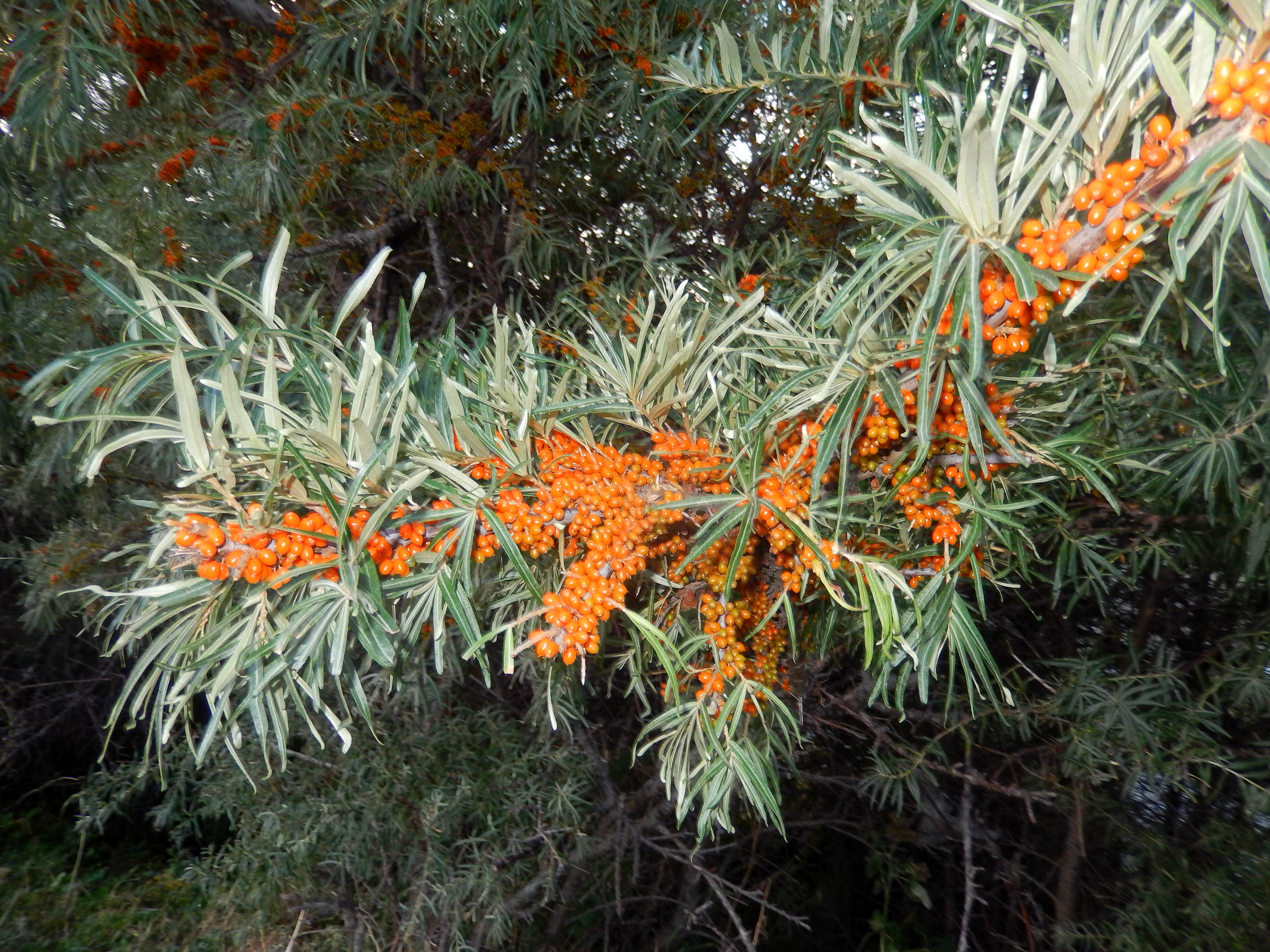
Berries of sea-buckthorn (Hippophae) as seen near the village

The Artanish peninsula of Lake Sevan with a hill of the same name, is located close to the village. Sea-buckthorn (Hippophae) with wild-growing edible sour berries grow at the shores of Lake Sevan. Planted after the lowering of the level of Lake Sevan in the Soviet period. The vicinity of the village hosts 111 species of butterflies and is recognized as the Prime Butterfly Area "Artanish-Shoghakat". Also the area is known as one of the key birding sites of Armenia.

=== Climate ===
The climate of the village is cold and continental, designated as Dfb in Köppen climate classification.

Climate data for Shorzha(1991-2020)
Month	Jan	Feb	Mar	Apr	May	Jun	Jul	Aug	Sep	Oct	Nov	Dec	Year
Daily mean °C (°F)	−4.6 (23.7)	−3.8 (25.2)	0.0 (32.0)	5.2 (41.4)	9.7 (49.5)	14.3 (57.7)	17.0 (62.6)	17.6 (63.7)	14.0 (57.2)	8.7 (47.7)	2.7 (36.9)	−2.0 (28.4)	6.6 (43.8)
Average precipitation mm (inches)	17.8 (0.70)	17.7 (0.70)	26.1 (1.03)	39.2 (1.54)	54.8 (2.16)	57.6 (2.27)	45.4 (1.79)	33.8 (1.33)	28.0 (1.10)	29.2 (1.15)	18.6 (0.73)	15.1 (0.59)	383.3 (15.09)
Average precipitation days	3.7	4.2	5.6	8.1	9.6	8.2	6	4.7	4.3	5.7	4	4.2	68.3
Average relative humidity (%)	76.4	76.8	78.5	77.3	74.7	73.3	73.1	72.2	73.6	74.9	78.2	77.9	75.6
Mean monthly sunshine hours	115.5	125.8	156.3	157.6	196.1	251.6	297.2	290.1	243.8	187	148.8	116.4	2,286.2
Source: NOAA

== Infrastructure ==
The village can be accessed via Armenian road M14 (repaired in 2020-21) running along the north-east shore of Lake Sevan either from Tsovagyugh village (in the northwest of Shoghakat) or from Vardenis (in the south-east). Another road connects it to the town of Chambarak in the north-west. In summer, passenger trains of South Caucasus Railways commute from Yerevan, via the towns of Hrazdan and Sevan.

== Recreation ==
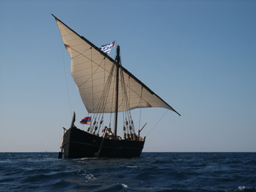
Cilicia vessel

The shores of Lake Sevan near the village hosts several popular camping sites. Most popular is perhaps the camping site called "Whishup" (a wordplay with Vishap, "dragon" in Armenian) located between the road and lakeshore at about 1.5 km from the village towards Tsovagyugh. Various water sports, like wakeboarding, kiteboarding, are practiced there and some equipment is available for rent along a sandy beach with a cafe. In summer evenings concerts are held at the stage on the beach. On the opposite side of the Artanish peninsula, the yachting clubs "Ayas" and "Armenian camp" can be found. Sailing and paddling equipment can be rented there and guided tours on a sailing ship can be booked.

A copy of a medieval Armenian sea vessel is placed there. Built in the 90's and named Cilicia (referring to Armenian Kingdom of Cilicia, where such vessels were built and used) it sailed round Europe, and was brought back to Lake Sevan. There is also a diver's club located nearby.

== Municipal administration ==
After administrative reforms in November 2017, the name of the village was changed from Shorzha to Shoghakat and it was assigned as the administrative centre of the same-name rural municipality including the villages of Aghberk, Artanish, Drakhtik, Jil and Tsapatagh.

== Gallery ==
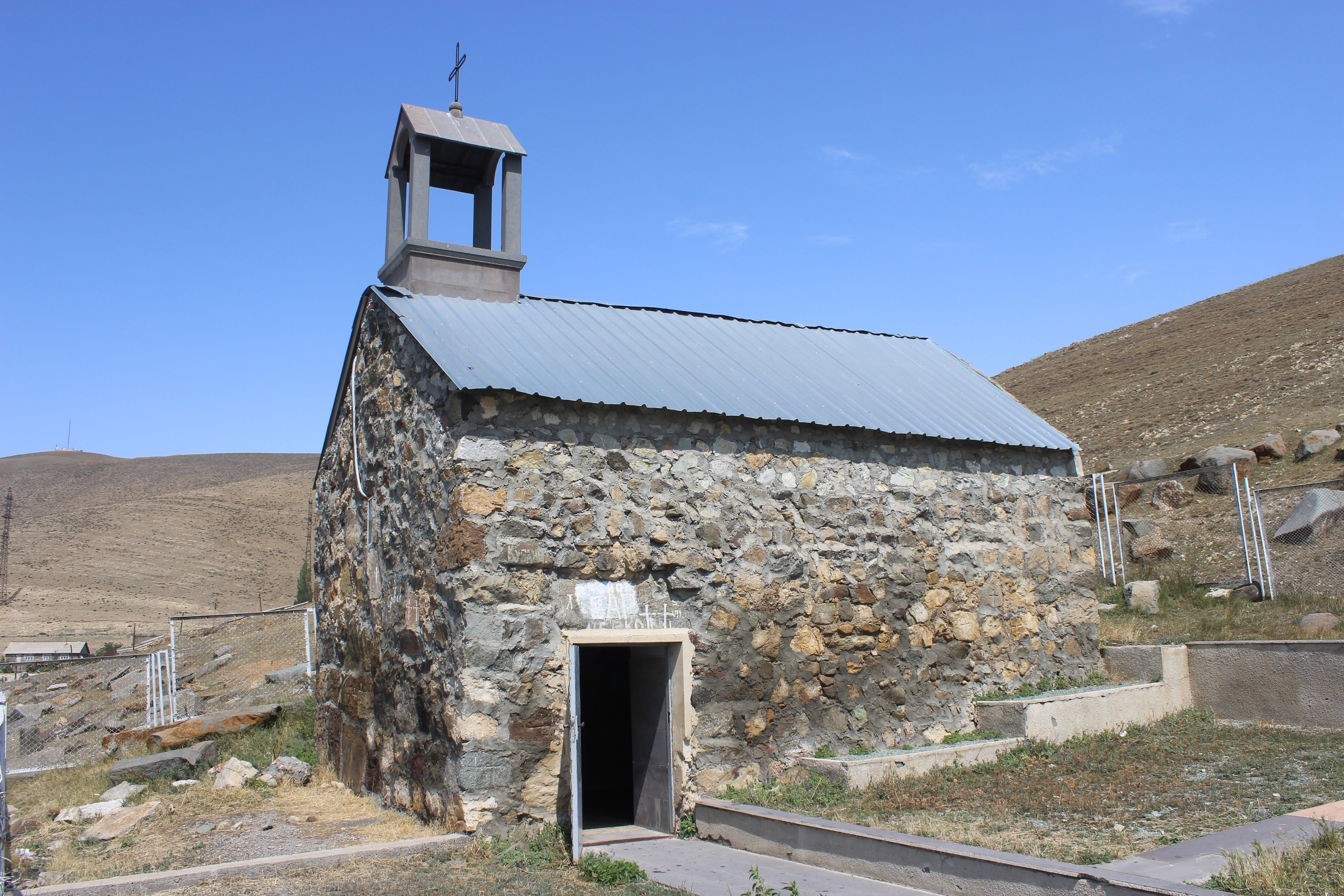
17th-century chapel on the outskirts of the village

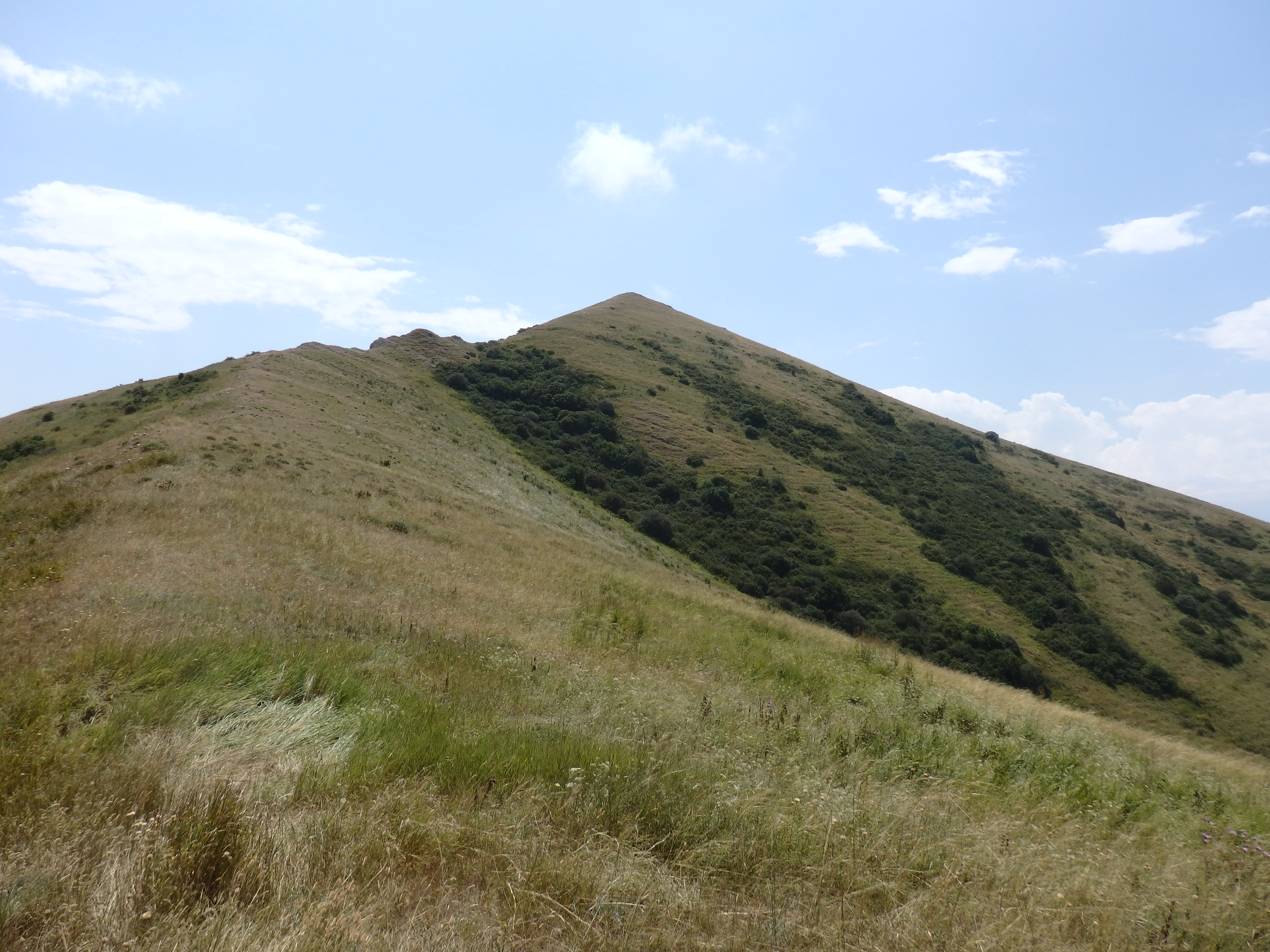
Hilltop of Artanish peninsula

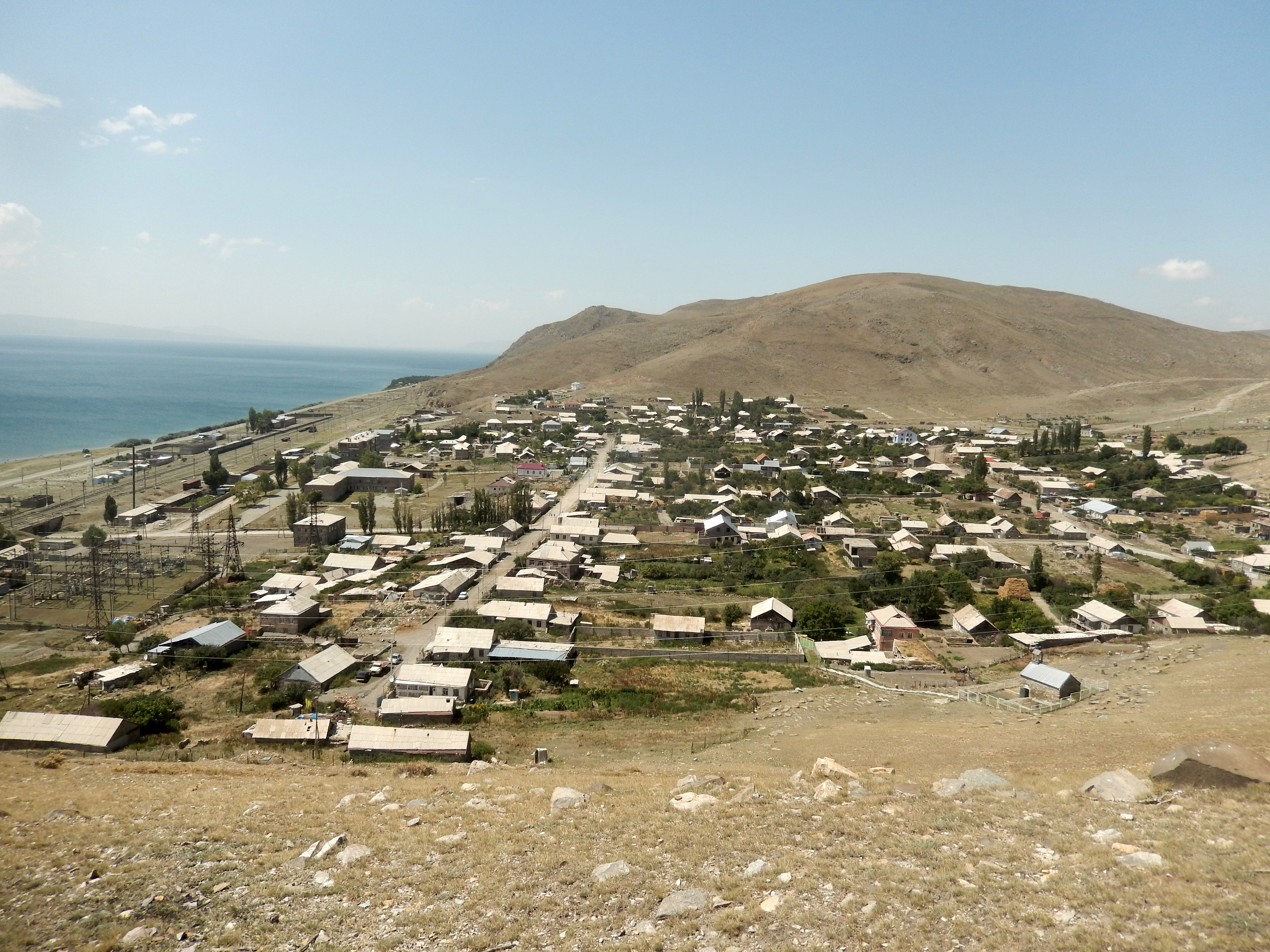
Shoghakat as viewed from atop the adjacent hill with chapel ruins

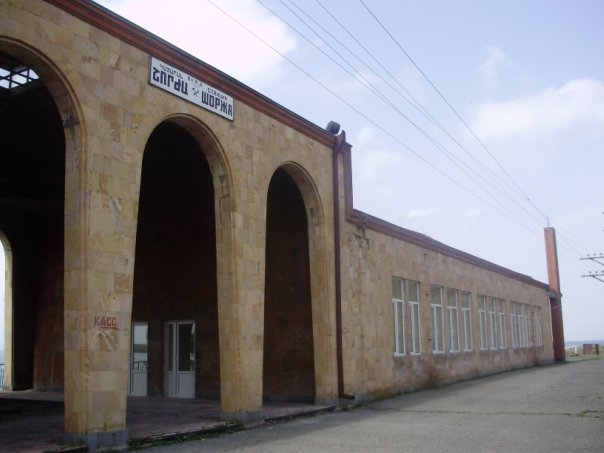
Railroad station

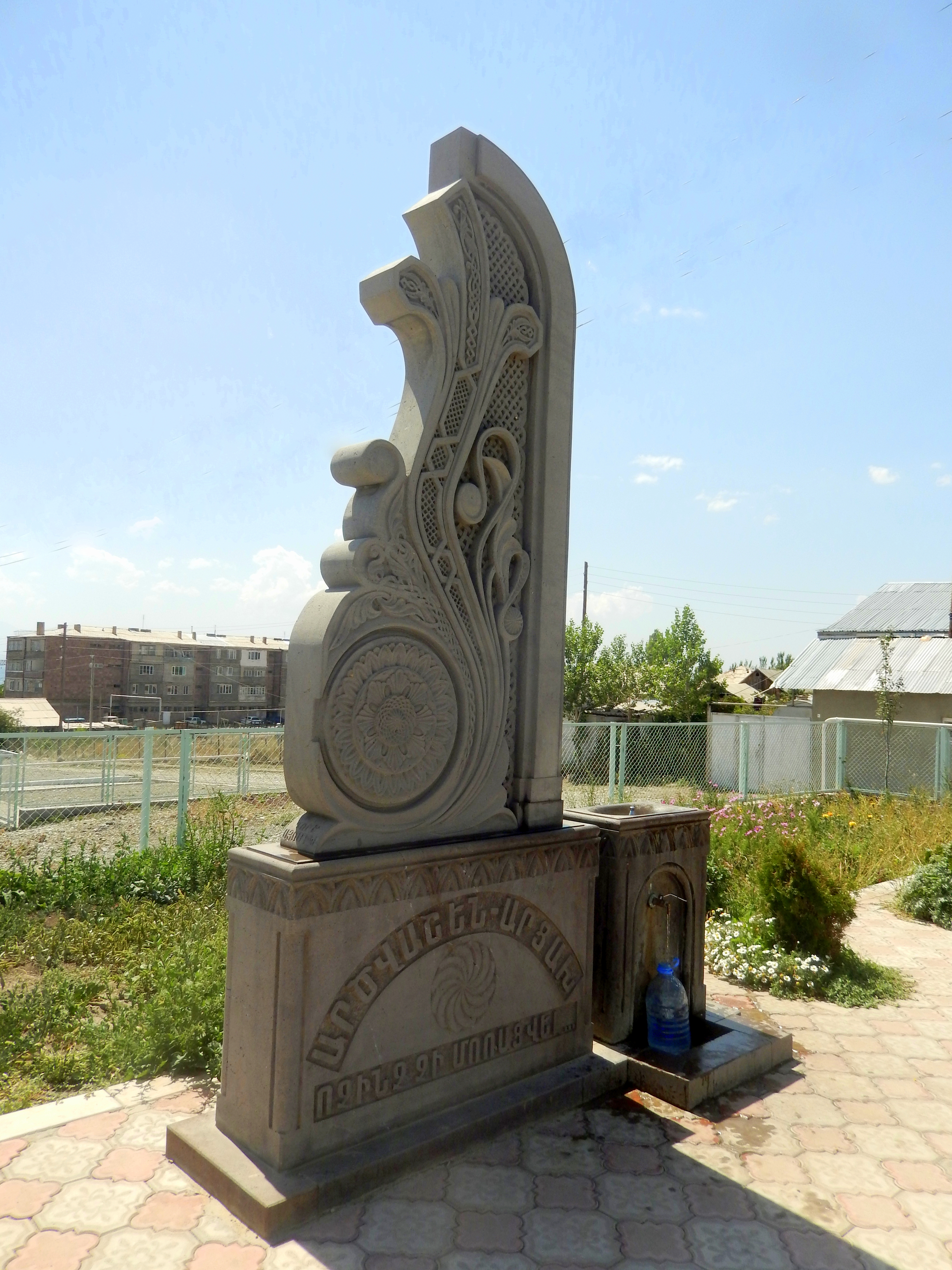
Monument to the fallen in the First Nagorno-Karabakh War

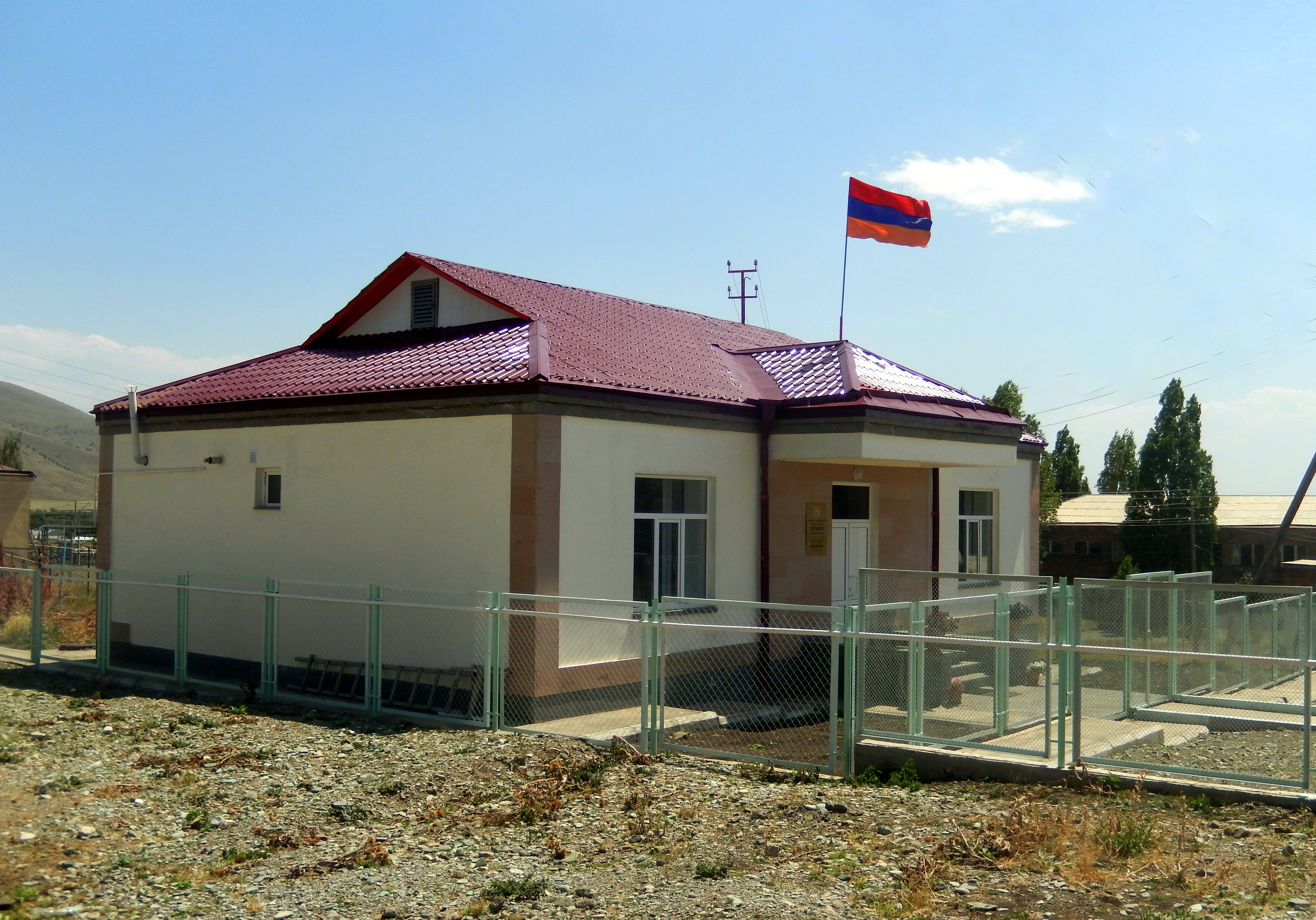
Municipality building
