= Lists of power stations =

A map of the world's power plants, April 2026

This is a list of articles listing power stations around the world by countries or regions. A power station (also referred to as a generating station, power plant, powerhouse or generating plant) is an industrial place for the generation of electric power.

== Africa ==
- List of power stations in Algeria
- List of power stations in Angola
- List of power stations in Benin
- List of power stations in Botswana
- List of power stations in Burkina Faso
- List of power stations in Burundi
- List of power stations in Cameroon
- List of power stations in Chad
- List of power stations in the Democratic Republic of the Congo
- List of power stations in Djibouti
- List of power stations in Egypt
- List of power stations in Equatorial Guinea
- List of power stations in Eritrea
- List of power stations in Eswatini
- List of power stations in Ethiopia
- List of power stations in Gabon
- List of power stations in Ghana
- List of power stations in Guinea
- List of power stations in Ivory Coast
- List of power stations in Kenya
- List of power stations in Liberia
- List of power stations in Libya
- List of power stations in Madagascar
- List of power stations in Malawi
- List of power stations in Mali
- List of power stations in Mauritania
- List of power stations in Morocco
- List of power stations in Mozambique
- List of power stations in Namibia
- List of power stations in Niger
- List of power stations in Nigeria
- List of power stations in the Republic of the Congo
- List of power stations in Rwanda
- List of power stations in Senegal
- List of power stations in Sierra Leone
- List of power stations in Somalia
- List of power stations in South Africa
- List of power stations in South Sudan
- List of power stations in Sudan
- List of power stations in Tanzania
- List of power stations in Togo
- List of power stations in Tunisia
- List of power stations in Uganda
- List of power stations in Zambia
- List of power stations in Zimbabwe

== Asia ==
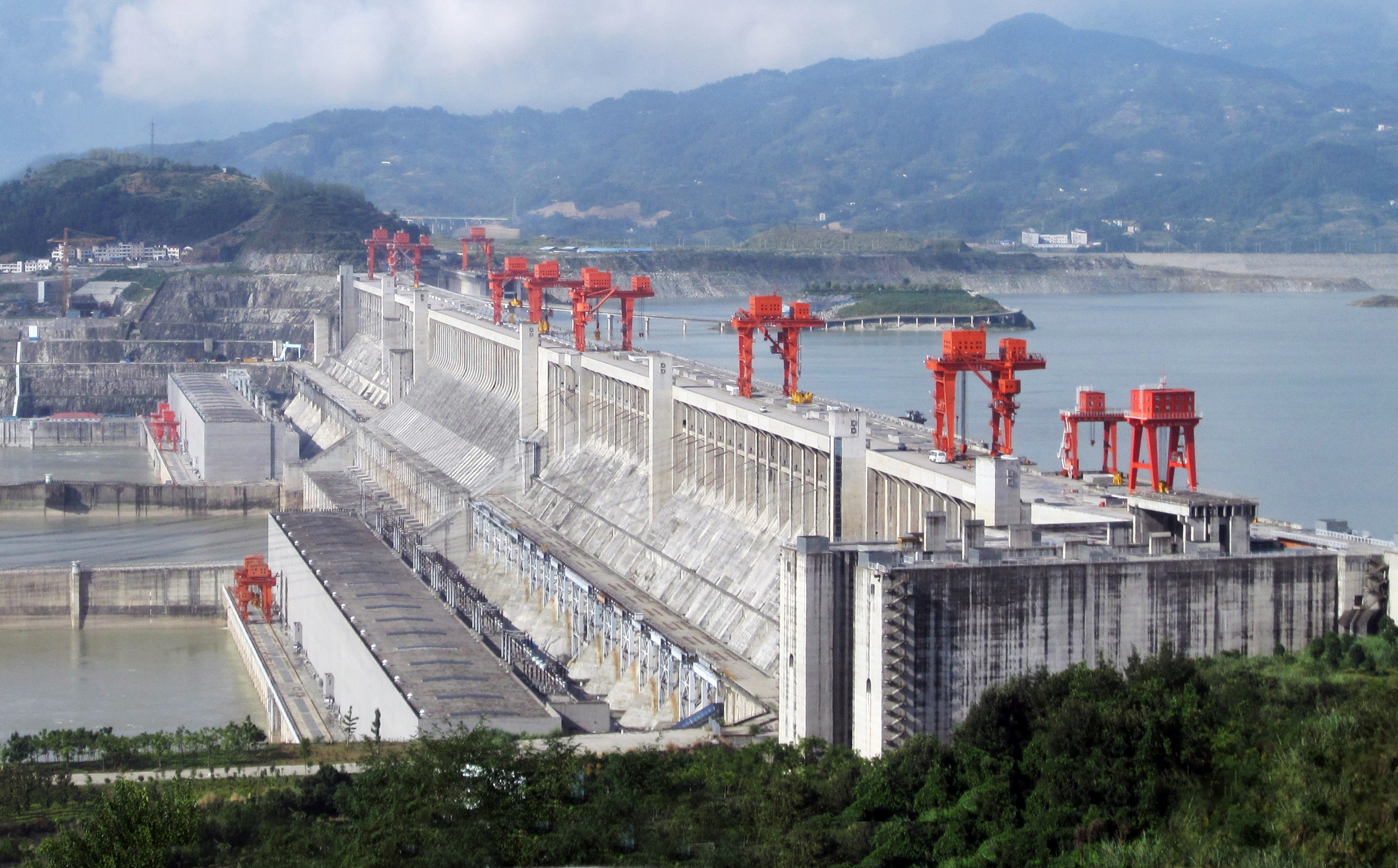
Three Gorges Dam in China, currently the largest hydroelectric power station, and the largest power producing body ever built, at 22,500 MW

- List of power stations in Afghanistan
- List of power stations in Armenia
- List of power stations in Azerbaijan
- List of power stations in China
  - List of major power stations in Anhui
  - List of major power stations in Beijing
  - List of major power stations in Chongqing
  - List of major power stations in Fujian province
  - List of major power stations in Gansu
  - List of major power stations in Guangdong
  - List of major power stations in Guangxi
  - List of major power stations in Guizhou
  - List of major power stations in Hainan province
  - List of major power stations in Hebei province
  - List of major power stations in Heilongjiang
  - List of major power stations in Henan province
  - List of power stations in Hong Kong
  - List of major power stations in Hubei province
  - List of major power stations in Hunan province
  - List of major power stations in Inner Mongolia
  - List of major power stations in Jiangsu province
  - List of major power stations in Jiangxi province
  - List of major power stations in Jilin province
  - List of major power stations in Liaoning province
  - List of power stations in Macau
  - List of major power stations in Ningxia
  - List of major power stations in Qinghai province
  - List of major power stations in Shaanxi
  - List of major power stations in Shandong
  - List of major power stations in Shanghai
  - List of major power stations in Shanxi
  - List of major power stations in Sichuan
  - List of major power stations in Tianjin
  - List of major power stations in the Tibet Autonomous Region
  - List of major power stations in Xinjiang
  - List of major power stations in Yunnan
  - List of major power stations in Zhejiang
- List of power stations in Georgia (country)
- List of power stations in India
- List of power stations in Indonesia
- List of power stations in Iran
- List of power stations in Iraq
- List of power stations in Israel
- List of power stations in Japan
- List of power stations in Kazakhstan
- List of power stations in Kyrgyzstan
- List of power stations in Malaysia
- List of power stations in Myanmar
- List of power stations in Nepal
- List of power stations in Pakistan
- List of power plants in the Philippines
- List of power stations in Russia
- List of power stations in South Korea
- List of power stations in Sri Lanka
- List of power stations in Syria
- List of power stations in Taiwan
- List of power stations in Tajikistan
- List of power stations in Thailand
- List of power stations in Turkey
- List of power stations in the United Arab Emirates
- List of power stations in Vietnam

== Europe ==
- List of power stations in Albania
- List of power stations in Armenia
- List of power stations in Austria
- List of power stations in Azerbaijan
- List of power stations in Belgium
- List of power stations in Bosnia-Herzegovina
- List of power stations in Bulgaria
- List of power stations in Croatia
- List of power stations in the Czech Republic
- List of power stations in Denmark
- List of power stations in Finland
- List of power stations in France
- List of power stations in Germany
- List of power stations in Greece
- List of power stations in Hungary
- List of power stations in Iceland
- List of power stations in the Republic of Ireland
- List of power stations in Italy
- List of power stations in Latvia
- List of power stations in Lithuania
- List of power stations in Kosovo
- List of power stations in Montenegro
- List of power stations in the Netherlands
- List of power stations in North Macedonia
- List of power stations in Norway
- List of power stations in Poland
- List of power stations in Portugal
- List of power stations in Romania
- List of power stations in Russia
- List of power stations in Serbia
- List of power stations in Slovakia
- List of power stations in Slovenia
- List of power stations in Spain
- List of power stations in Sweden
- List of power stations in Switzerland
- List of power stations in Ukraine
- List of power stations in the United Kingdom
  - List of power stations in England
  - List of power stations in Northern Ireland
  - List of power stations in Scotland
  - List of power stations in Wales
  - List of power stations in the Crown Dependencies
  - List of cooling towers at UK power stations
  - List of natural gas-fired power stations in the United Kingdom
  - List of onshore wind farms in the United Kingdom
  - List of offshore wind farms in the United Kingdom

== North America ==
- List of generating stations in Canada
  - List of generating stations in Alberta
  - List of generating stations in British Columbia
  - List of generating stations in Manitoba
  - List of generating stations in New Brunswick
  - List of generating stations in Newfoundland and Labrador
  - List of generating stations in the Northwest Territories
  - List of generating stations in Nova Scotia
  - List of generating stations in Nunavut
  - List of generating stations in Ontario
  - List of generating stations in Prince Edward Island
  - List of generating stations in Quebec
  - List of generating stations in Saskatchewan
  - List of generating stations in Yukon
- List of power stations in Costa Rica
- List of hydroelectric power stations in Guatemala
- List of power stations in Jamaica
- List of power stations in Mexico
- List of power stations in Panama
- List of power stations in the United States
  - List of power stations in Arizona
  - List of power stations in California
  - List of power stations in Florida
  - List of power stations in Georgia
  - List of power stations in Illinois
  - List of power stations in Indiana
  - List of power stations in Michigan
  - List of power stations in Nevada
  - List of power stations in New Jersey
  - List of power stations in New Mexico
  - List of power stations in New York
  - List of power stations in Oregon
  - List of power stations in Pennsylvania
  - List of power stations in South Carolina
  - List of power stations in South Dakota
  - List of power stations in Texas
  - List of power stations in Virginia
  - List of power stations in Washington
  - List of power stations in Wisconsin
  - List of wind farms in the United States

== Oceania ==
- List of power stations in Australia
  - List of power stations in New South Wales
  - List of power stations in Queensland
  - List of power stations in South Australia
  - List of power stations in Tasmania
  - List of power stations in Victoria
  - List of power stations in Western Australia
  - List of proposed power stations in Australia
- List of power stations in New Zealand

== South America ==
- List of power stations in Argentina
- List of power stations in Bolivia
- List of power stations in Brazil
- List of power stations in Chile
- List of power stations in Colombia
- List of power stations in Paraguay
- List of power stations in Peru
- List of power stations in Suriname
- List of power stations in Uruguay
- List of power stations in Venezuela

== Other ==
- List of commercial nuclear reactors
- List of largest power stations
- List of photovoltaic power stations
- List of solar thermal power stations
