= HTPP =

HTPP may refer to:

- Hrazdan Thermal Power Plant, a power plant in Armenia
- Hypertext Printing Protocol, a precursor of the Internet Printing Protocol

== See also ==
- HTTP, the Hypertext Transfer Protocol
