= Edwaleni Solar Power Station =

Solar farm in Manzini, Eswatini

- Country: Eswatini
- Location: Matsapha, Manzini Region
- Coordinates: 26°34′16″S 31°18′35″E
- Status: Under construction
- Construction began: 2021
- Commission date: 2022 Expected
- Construction cost: US$100 million (€98.8 million)
- Owner: Frazium Energy
- Operator: Frazium Energy

Solar farm
- Type: Flat-panel PV
- Site area: 45 hectares (110 acres)

Power generation
- Units operational: 75000
- Nameplate capacity: 100 MW (130,000 hp)
- Annual net output: 100 GWh

Edwaleni Solar Power Station, is a 100 megawatts solar power plant under construction in Eswatini. The solar farm is under development by Frazium Energy, a subsidiary of the Frazer Solar Group, an Australian-German conglomerate. The solar component is complemented by a battery energy storage system, expected to be the largest in Africa. The energy off-taker is Eswatini Electricity Company (EEC), the national electricity utility parastatal company, under a 40-year power purchase agreement (PPA). EEC plans to inject the energy into the Southern Africa Power Pool, for use primarily in South Africa.

== Location ==
The development sits on 45 hectares (110 acres) of real estate, provided by the Eswatini government. The power station is located in the town of Matsapha, in Manzini Region, in central Eswatini. The solar farm sits adjacent to the government-owned 15 megawatt Edwaleni Hydroelectric Power Station.

Matsapha is located approximately 8 kilometres (5 mi) west of the city of Manzini, the regional capital. This is approximately 34 kilometres (21 mi) southeast of Mbabane, the country's capital city.

== Overview ==
The power station is owned and is being developed by Frazium Energy from Germany. The design calls for the installation of 75,000 solar panels on 45 hectares (110 acres), on a site that measures 54 hectares (130 acres). The solar component will be attached to a large battery energy storage system, described as the "largest project of its kind in Africa". The ultimate beneficiary is intended to be the South African electricity grid, through the Southern African Power Pool, over a 40-year period, according to an existing PPA.

== Cost and timeline ==
The cost of construction is reported to be US$115 million (approx. €98.8 million). Commercial commissioning is anticipated in the second half of 2022.

== See also ==
- List of power stations in Eswatini
