= Film Cooling Towers Limited =

Film Cooling Towers Limited, otherwise Film Cooling Towers (1925) Limited, was a British limited liability company, originally established in 1914, to design and construct cooling towers for the chemical and electricity industries. It was operational until 1970.

== Background ==
Film Cooling Towers Limited was established in 1914 and Incorporated in 1915. It manufactured cooling towers, cooling frames and air filters. It had capital of £6,000 of which £5,352 was issued. In 1922 its directors were Edward Hunter Low, W. W. White, L. Clemow and P. Eric Jeffcock. It employed 20 people and its offices were at 124 Chancery Lane, London, WC2.

The name ‘film’ refers to the falling film of hot water that the company’s cooling towers internal structures produced, as opposed to falling droplets or spray.

The company went into liquidation in 1925. Its assets were acquired by Film Cooling Towers (1925) Limited.

== Film Cooling Towers (1925) Limited ==
This company was founded by Karl Wladimir Branczik (1878 – 1953) and was registered on 28 March 1925. It acquired the assets of the 1914 company. Its first Directors were A.V. de la Salle and H. G. Geves. In 1958 the Directors were Isabel M. Branczik and E. A. Howe. Its works and registered office was at Lionel Road, Kew Bridge, Brentford, Middlesex. Its authorized capital was 6,000 ordinary shares of £1 each, with £5,250 issued.

On 22 August 1938 a world-wide patent (GB518373) was granted to K.W. Branczik on improvements in or relating to cooling towers. Specifically it relates to a series of cooling laths arranged in zig-zag fashion, so as to baffle the entering air and to cause the water to fall into the pond in sheets extending towards the centre of the tower.

The company designed and constructed timber and reinforced concrete cooling towers and spray coolers for the chemical and electricity industries. Typical of its portfolio was a commission for the chemical industry:

- Design and construct for BP Chemicals at its Baglan Bay chemicals plant, two natural draught hyperbolic cooling towers. Dimensions: height 296 ft., ring beam diameter 244 ft.; throat diameter 124 ft.; top diameter 131 ft.

=== Electricity supply industry ===
For the electricity supply industry the company built wooden and reinforced concrete, natural and induced draft, cooling towers.

Cooling towers constructed by Film Cooling Towers for the UK electricity industry.
Power station	Cooling tower: number, type, capacity	Construction year	Demolition
Grimsby	3 × wood, 3 × concrete, total 2.47 mgph Film and other manufactures	1924-39	late 1960s
Bristol	2 × wood 0.9 mgph	1928	1959
Watford	2 × 0.25 mgph	Before 1950	1969-70
Upper Boat	1 RC 2.25 mgph	1924-9	1976
Brimsdown A	2 = 2 mgph	1938	
Brimsdown B	5 = 6.6 mgph	1928	1976
Llynfi	1 RC 2.5 mgph	1943	after 1977
Huncoat	2 × 3 mgph	1947-55	1988
Goldington	4 × 1.2 mgph RC	1951-58	1986
Rugeley	4 × 3.6 mgph RC	1958-61	2021
Thorpe Marsh	4 × RC	1959-63	2012
Ferrybridge C	8 × RC, 115 m high	1961-67	2019, 2022
Drakelow C	6 × RC	1961	2006
Richborough	3 × RC	1963	2012
Ironbridge B	4 × RC	1963-68	2019
Cottam	8 × RC, each 6.75 mgph, 114 m high	1964-70	2025
Didcot	6 × 11.4 m^{3}/s, RC 114 m high 91 m diam.	1965-70	2014, 2019

Key: mgph – million gallons per hour, 1.0 mgph = 1.263 m^{3}/sec; RC – reinforced concrete.

When successfully tendering for the £1.5 million contract to design and build the four cooling towers for Ironbridge power station, the company operated as Film Cooling Towers (Concrete) Limited. In November 1965 three of the cooling towers at Ferrybridge power station built by Film Cooling Towers (Concrete) Limited collapsed during a gale. Film Cooling Towers (Concrete) Limited was a 50/50 joint venture between Film Cooling Towers (1925) Limited and J L Kier and Co.

In 1970 the company was taken over by Meyer International Group as an outlet for its wooden products.

== See also ==
List of cooling towers at UK power stations
