= Panjiakou Dam =

- Location within China
- Country: China
- Location: Qianxi County
- Coordinates: 40°23′19″N 118°16′47″E
- Status: Operational
- Construction began: 1975
- Opening date: 1981

Dam and spillways
- Type of dam: Concrete gravity
- Impounds: Luan River
- Height: 107.5 m (353 ft)
- Length: 1,040 m (3,412 ft)
- Spillway capacity: 40,400 m^{3}/s (1,426,713 cu ft/s)

Reservoir
- Total capacity: 2,930,000,000 m^{3} (2,375,390 acre⋅ft)
- Active capacity: 1,950,000,000 m^{3} (1,580,891 acre⋅ft)
- Catchment area: 33,700 km^{2} (13,012 sq mi)
- Surface area: 67 km^{2} (26 sq mi)

Power Station
- Commission date: 1981/1993
- Turbines: 1 x 150 MW Francis-type; 3 x 90 MW reversible Francis-type; 2 x 5 MW Kaplan-type (lower reservoir)
- Installed capacity: 420 MW

The Panjiakou Dam is a concrete gravity dam on the Luan River in Qianxi County, Hebei Province, China. The primary purpose of the dam is to provide water for the cities of Tianjin and Tangshan, located to the south. The dam also provides flood control and its power plant has an installed capacity of 420 MW which includes a 270 MW pumped storage power station.

== Background ==
Construction on the first stage of the project began in 1975 and the single 150 MW generator was operational in 1981. In 1984, the first stage was complete and in the same year, construction on the second stage began. This consisted of the lower reservoir and pump-generators for the pumped storage power station. In 1989, the lower reservoir began to impound and in 1993, the pump-generators were operational. Water supplied by the dam is used for industrial, agricultural and municipal needs in Tianjin and Tangshan. When the Panjiakou Reservoir was filled, it submerged the town of Panjiakou under 50 m (164 ft) of water. Located in the hills above the town is a section of the Great Wall, part of which was submerged as well. The submerged section ran through Panjiakou pass and a portion can be seen on a small island off the reservoir's edge at 40°25′51″N 118°16′12″E, particularly during droughts when the reservoir holds less water. The scenery around the reservoir is a popular tourist destination and with the surrounding terrain, it is often called "Qianxi Little Three Gorges".

== Design and operation ==
The Panjiakou Dam is a 107.5 m (353 ft) tall and 1,040 m (3,412 ft) concrete gravity dam. The dam's reservoir has a capacity of 2,930,000,000 m^{3} (2,375,390 acre⋅ft) and surface area of 67 km^{2} (26 sq mi). Of the reservoir's capacity, 1,950,000,000 m^{3} (1,580,891 acre⋅ft) is active (or "useful") for power generation and water supply. The dam sits at the head of a 33,700 km^{2} (13,012 sq mi) catchment area which constitutes 75 percent of the Luan River basin. The dam's spillway is located on its left face and contains 18 floodgates. It has a maximum discharge capacity of 40,400 m^{3}/s (1,426,713 cu ft/s). To the right of the spillway is the power house which contains one 150 MW Francis turbine generator and three 90 MW reversible Francis turbine pump generators. Located 5.5 km (3 mi) downstream is the lower reservoir dam. It is a gravity type and has a height of 28 m (92 ft) and length of 1,010 m (3,314 ft). It creates the lower reservoir with a storage capacity of 36,180,000 m^{3} (29,332 acre⋅ft) of which 10,000,000 m^{3} (8,107 acre⋅ft) can be used for pumped storage power generation. When the pumped storage capability is used, the Panjiakou Reservoir serves as the upper reservoir and water is released down to the three pump generators for power production. It is subsequently discharged into the lower reservoir. This occurs during periods of high peak power demand. When power demand is low, usually at night when electricity is cheaper, the turbines of the pump generators reverse and pump water back into the upper reservoir. This process repeats as needed. A small power plant on the lower reservoir dam contains two 5 MW Kaplan turbine bulb-generators.

== See also ==
- List of dams and reservoirs in China
- List of major power stations in Hebei
