= List of power stations in Somalia =

This article lists all power stations in Somalia.

Somalia has a total of 10 power facility units,4 of them is out of service

== Thermal ==
Thermal power station	Community	Coordinates	Fuel type	Capacity	Year completed	Owner	Notes
Mogadishu Thermal Power Station	Mogadishu		Diesel fuel	4.5 MW	2004	Somali Energy Company	Operational
Necsom Power Station	Garowe		Diesel fuel, solar power	10 MW	2003		Operational
Gesira Steam Power Station	Mogadishu		Steam	30 MW	1985		Out of service
Borama Power Station	Borama		Diesel fuel	2 MW	2005	Aloog Electricity Company	Operational
Kismayo Thermal Power Station	Kismayo		Diesel fuel				Out of service
Hargeisa Power Station	Hargeisa		Diesel fuel	25 MW			Operational
Bosaso Power Station	Bosaso		Diesel fuel				Operational
Qardho Power Station	Qardho		Diesel fuel				Operational
Baidoa Power Station	Baidoa		Diesel fuel				Out of service
Hobyo power station	Hobyo		Diesel fuel	2 MW	1987		Out of service

== See also ==
- Energy in Somalia
- List of largest power stations in the world
- List of power stations in Africa
