= List of power stations in Bolivia =

The following page lists power stations in Bolivia. Most of them are managed by ENDE.

== Installed generating capacity and production ==
Bolivia had an estimated installed generating capacity of 1,365 MW in 2012 and produced an estimated 7.375 billion kWh in 2013.

== Hydroelectric ==
Hydroelectric power plants with a nameplate capacity > 20 MW.

Name	Capacity (MW)	River (basin)	Status
Chojlla HPP	38,4	Río Taquesi	Operational
Corani HPP	45	Corani Lake	Operational
Misicuni Dam	80	Río Misicuni	Under construction
Santa Isabel HPP	93,4	Corani Lake	Operational
Yanacachi HPP	51,1	Río Taquesi	Operational

== Thermal ==
Thermal power plants with a nameplate capacity > 80 MW.

Name	Capacity (MW)	Type of fuel	Status
Bulo Bulo Power Plant	90	Natural gas	Operational
Carrasco Power Plant	152,6	Natural gas	Operational
El Alto Power Plant	80	Natural gas	Operational
Entre Rios Power Plant	120	Natural gas	Operational
Guaracachi Power Plant	350	Natural gas	Operational
Valle Hermoso Power Plant	167	Natural gas	Operational

== Additional information ==
- Bulo Bulo, Cochabamba, 2 X 45 MW LM6000 gas turbines, natural gas

Bulo Bulo was built by a joint venture of NRG Energy, Vattenfall, and Pan American Energy LLC. It went commercial on 30 June 2000 with a 30-year generation license. In May 2003, Petrolera Chaco purchased the plant.

- Entre Rios, Cochabamba, 4 X 30 MW SGT-700 gas turbines, natural gas

This project is a 60:40 joint venture of Ende and PDVSA and was the result of an August 2007 agreement between Presidents Evo Morales and Hugo Chávez. It cost about $80mn and connects to the 230kV grid. Commercial operation began on 22 July 2010.

- Guaracachi, Santa Cruz, 210-MW, 2+1 CCGT plant with 6001FA gas turbines, natural gas

In Oct 2010, two 6FA gas turbines at Guaracachi in Santa Cruz were converted to combined-cycle operation. In addition to the HRSGs and steam set, the installation included a new five-cell mechanical draft tower and a demineralized water treatment plant. The plant was 50% owned by Rurelec PLC when nationalized by Bolivian President Evo Morales in February 2010.

== See also ==
- List of power stations
- List of power stations in South America
