= Gazprom Armenia =

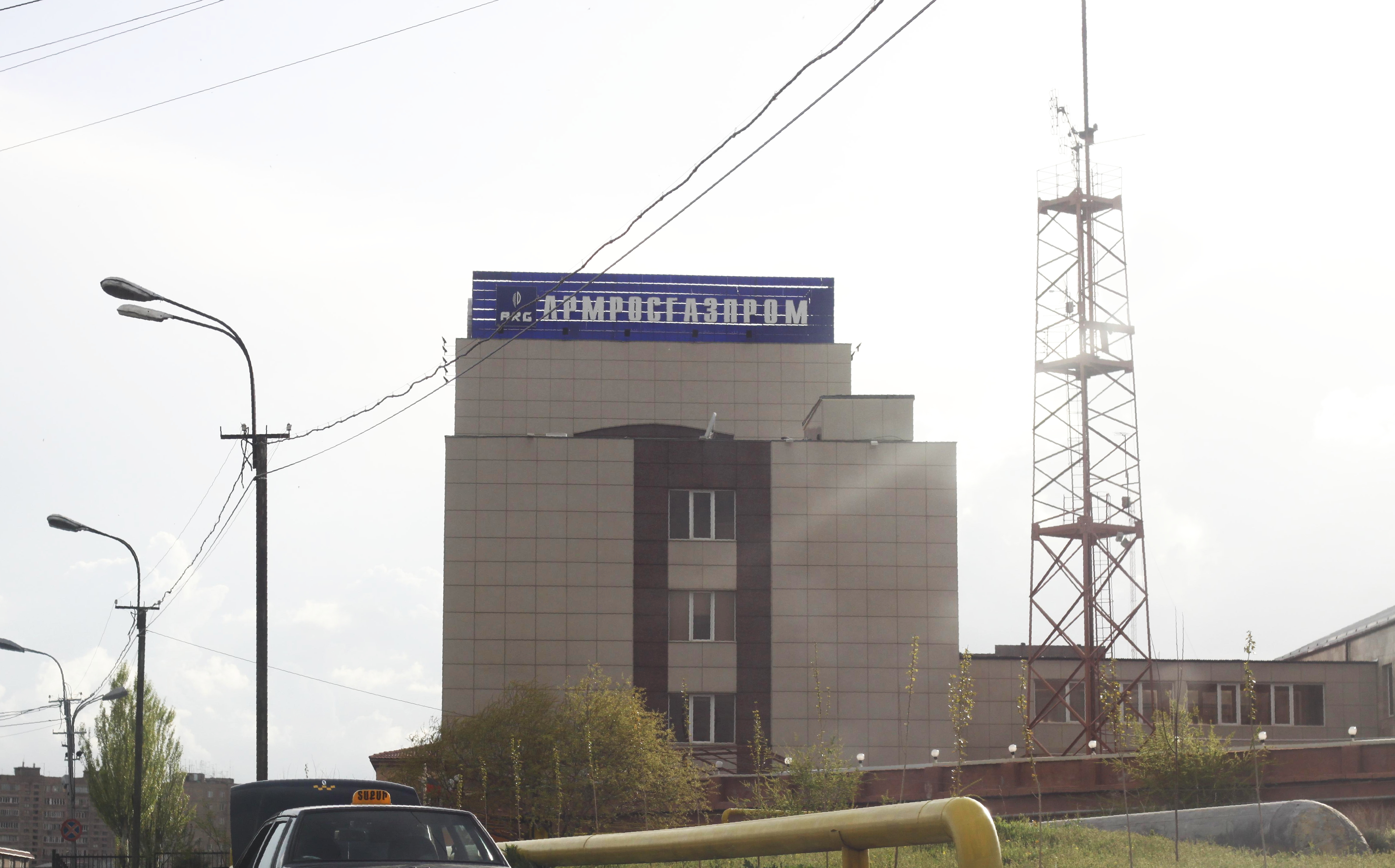
- Headquarters in the Kanaker-Zeytun District of Yerevan
- Founded: 1997
- Headquarters: Yerevan, Armenia
- Owner: Vardan Harutyunyan
- Parent: Gazprom
- Website: www.gazpromarmenia.am

Gazprom Armenia (Armenian: Գազպրոմ Արմենիա; Russian: Газпром Армения), formerly known as ArmRosGazprom (Armenian: ՀայՌուսգազարդ; Russian: Армросгазпром), is a subsidiary of the Russian Gazprom company in Armenia. It was founded in 1997 as a joint Russian-Armenian natural gas pipeline project. When it was founded, the Russian state gas monopolist Gazprom owned 45% of stock, the Energy Ministry of Armenia 45% and the ITERA company 10%. In 2014, Gazprom became the sole owner of the company and renamed it Gazprom Armenia. The Director General of the company is Vardan Harutyunyan. The company operates the gas supply for Armenia's domestic gas market and also produces power generation.

== History ==
In April 2006, Gazprom and Armenia signed a contract for 25 years about strategic principles of cooperation in gas and energy projects in the Armenian territory. After this contract Gazprom raised the gas price from the preferential $54 per 1,000 m^{3} to $110 per 1,000 m^{3}. The price is fixed on this still preferential level until 1 January 2009.

To avoid a higher prizes level for natural gas, the Armenian government had to make some concessions that the Iran-Armenia Natural Gas Pipeline and the 5th unit of the Hrazdan Thermal Power Station get under control of ARG. Final owner rights must transit till 1 January 2007.

As part of the contract, Russia wanted to limit the diameter of the Iran-Armenia Natural Gas Pipeline to 700 mm to prevent the use of the pipeline to transport bigger amounts of gas to other countries like Georgia. However, the pipeline was built with the diameter of 1,200 mm.

The Hrazdan Thermal Power Stations is the biggest power station of the Armenian energy complex. The incomplete but modern 5th unit should be completed and equipped with gas turbine engine up to 140 MWt.

During a visit to Moscow at the end of October 2006, Armenia's President Robert Kocharyan announced, that Gazprom will buy additional ARG-shares and then controls 58% of the companies equity capital. On 27 October 2006 Gazprom's executive board approved acquire additional issues of ARG, which is most likely part of April's controversial deal. According to Karen Karapetyan, Gazprom will pay $118.8 million to have the commanding share of ARG.

In January 2014, Gazprom agreed to purchase another 20% of ARG bringing Gazprom's ownership to 100% of the company. The company was renamed Gazprom Armenia. The agreed was signed by Chairman Alexey Miller (Gazprom) and Armenian Minister of Energy and Natural Resources Armen Movsisyan.

== Criticism ==
Since Armenia fully depends on gas imports from Russia via Georgia, the Iran-Armenia Natural Gas Pipeline was intended to decrease dependency on Russia. The 1.1 bcm of gas per year had given Armenia a considerable bargaining power against Gazprom. Critics now say that placing the pipeline under Russian control would only deepen that dependence and that the agreement could be seen as a big geopolitical victory of Russia in the South Caucasus region.

== Directors ==
- Roland Adonts (1997–2001)
- Karen Karapetyan (2001–2010)
- Vardan Harutyunyan (2010–2016)

== See also ==
- Energy in Armenia
- List of companies of Armenia
