= List of power stations in Hungary =

The following page is a full list of power stations in Hungary that are at least 50 MW in capacity. The list is based on information from the Hungarian grid operator MAVIR. Plants that were permanently shut down are excluded.

| Name of plant | Years built | Capacity (MW) | Number of turbines (db) | Capacity per turbine (MW) | Fuel |
|---|---|---|---|---|---|
| Dunai Vasmű Power Plant (Dunaújváros) | 1950-1956 | 64 | 4 | | brown gas, natural gas |
| Pécs Thermal Power Plant | 1955-1966 | 70 | 2 | 35, 35 | natural gas, wood; 35 MW on permanent hiatus |
| Ajka Thermal Power Plant | 1957-1962 | 102 | 3 | | biomass, imported coal; 54 MW on permanent hiatus |
| Kispest Power Plant | 2003 | 113 | 1 | 113 | natural gas, fuel oil |
| Kelenföld Gas Turbine Plant | 1990-1996 | 188 | 4 | 129, 49, 5, 5 | natural gas, fuel oil |
| Újpest Gas Turbine Plant | 1999-2002 | 105 | 1 | 105 | natural gas, fuel oil |
| Mátra Power Plant (Gagarin) (Visonta) | 1965-1973 | 966 | 5 | 100, 200 | lignite, biomass, solar, natural gas; 200MW on hiatus from 2021 |
| Paks Nuclear Power Plant | 1973-1986 | 1889 | 4 | 473 | uranium dioxide |
| Dunamenti Gas Turbine (Százhalombatta) | 1989-1998 | 794 | 3 | 408, 145, 241 | natural gas. 80 MWh / 40 MW battery |
| Peak power plants of MVM (Litér, Sajószöged) | 1995-1998 | 240 | 2 | 120 | fuel oil |
| Lőrinci Gas Turbine Plant | 1997-2000 | 170 | 1 | 170 | fuel oil |
| Csepel Gas Turbine Plant | 1995-2000 | 410 | 3 | 118, 146, 146 | natural gas, fuel oil |
| Debrecen Combined Cycle Plant | 1999-2000 | 95 | 1 | 95 | natural gas, on permanent hiatus but may restart |
| Ajka Gas Turbine Plant | 2009-2010 | 116 | 2 | 58 | natural gas, fuel oil |
| Gönyű Combined Cycle Plant | 2010-2011 | 433 | 1 | 433 | natural gas |
| | Solar power stations | | | | |
| Mezőcsát Solar Park | 2023 | 250 | | | |
| Lumen Park Szolnok | 2023 | 138 | | | |
| Inárcs Solar Power Plant | 2023 | 132 | | | |
| Kaposvár Solar Park | 2021 | 100 | | | |
| Buj battery | 2026 | 100 | | | 288 MWh capacity |

== Details on the Paks Nuclear Plant ==
- Paks - 4 VVER 440 MWe reactors

| Station | Site | Coordinates | Type | Net capacity | Construction date | Grid date |
|---|---|---|---|---|---|---|
| PAKS-1 | Paks | 46.572389°N 18.852507°E | VVER-440/V213 | 460 MWe | 01-Aug-74 | 28-Dec-82 |
| PAKS-2 | Paks | 46.57334°N 18.852357°E | VVER-440/V213 | 460 MWe | 01-Aug-74 | 06-Sept-84 |
| PAKS-3 | Paks | 46.574837°N 18.852378°E | VVER-440/V213 | 460 MWe | 01-Oct-79 | 28-Sept-86 |
| PAKS-4 | Paks | 46.575759°N 18.852357°E | VVER-440/V213 | 470 MWe | 01-Oct-79 | 16-Aug-87 |

== See also ==
- Energy policy of the European Union
- List of power stations in Europe
- List of largest power stations in the world
