= List of power stations in the Republic of the Congo =

This article lists power stations in the Republic of the Congo.

== Thermal ==
Power plant	Capacity (MW)	Fuel type	Year completed	Refs
Pointe-Noire	300	Gas	2011	
Brazzaville	32			

== Hydroelectric ==
Station	Community	Coordinates	River	Capacity (MW)	Year completed	Refs
Sounda				1,000	Planned	
Chollet	With Cameroon			600	Planned	
Imboulou	Plateaux	02°56′05″S 16°07′40″E	Lefini	120	2011	
Moukoukoulou	Kouilou	03°53′40″S 13°45′52″E		74		
Djoué	Brazzaville	04°18′04″S 15°12′24″E	Djoue	15		

== See also ==
- List of power stations in Africa
- List of largest power stations in the world
