= Hrazdan Thermal Power Plant =

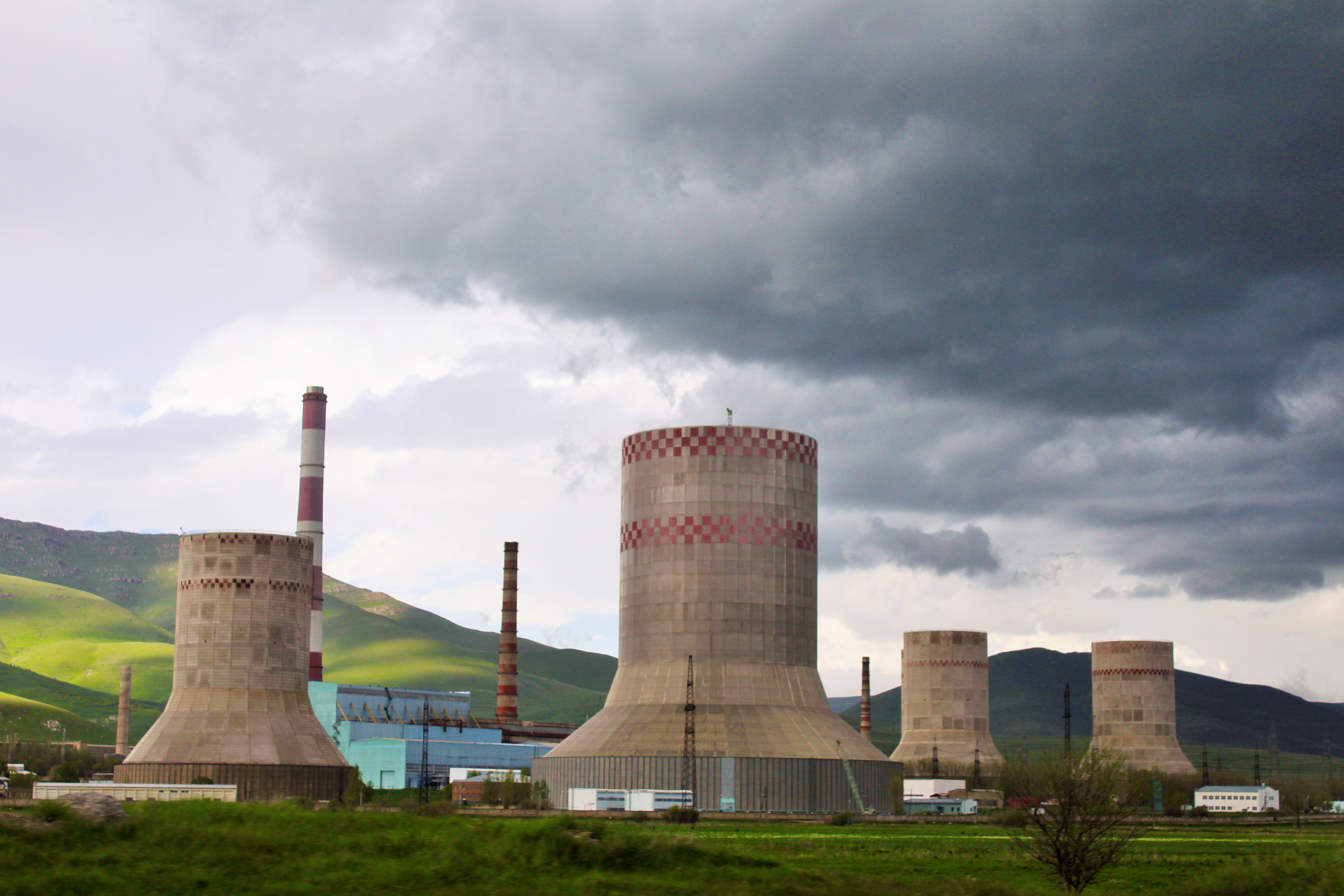
- Hrazdan TPP view
- Official name: Հրազդանի պետական շրջանային էլեկտրակայան
- Country: Armenia
- Location: Hrazdan
- Coordinates: 40°33′56″N 44°45′03″E
- Status: Operational
- Construction began: 1963
- Commission date: 1966
- Owners: Hrazdan Power Company (units 1–4), owned by family of Samvel Karapetyan; Gazprom Armenia (unit 5)
- Operators: Hrazdan Power Company (units 1–4); Gazprom Armenia (unit 5)

Thermal power station
- Primary fuel: Natural gas
- Secondary fuel: Fuel oil
- Cooling source: Hrazdan River
- Cogeneration?: Yes

Power generation
- Units operational: 2 X 50 MW (unit 1); 2 X 100 MW (unit 2); 3 X 200 MW (unit 3); 1 X 210 MW (unit 4); 1 X 480 MW (unit 5)
- Make and model: EPC: Teploenergostroymontaj
- Units cancelled: 3 X 300 MW
- Nameplate capacity: 1,110 MW (units 1-4); 480 MW (unit 5)

External links
- Website: www.raztes.am/eng/
- Commons: Related media on Commons

Hrazdan Thermal Power Plant (Hrazdan TPP, Armenian: Հրազդանի ջերմաէլեկտրակայան) is a natural gas-fired power plant in the northwestern part of Hrazdan city, generating electricity in Armenia. It is the largest power plant in Armenia.

This power plant was built in 1963–1974, and the first unit became operational in 1966. In 2013, a new unit was added. Four older units of the plant are owned and operated by the Hrazdan Power Company, a subsidiary of Tashir Capital owned by the family of Samvel Karapetyan. The new fifth unit is owned and operated by Gazprom Armenia.

== History ==
Hrazdan Thermal Power Plant (HTTP) was envisioned as a power plant to serve the entire South Caucasus region, including Armenia. Construction began in 1963, and the plant became functional in 1966, with two turbines with a total capacity up to 100 MW. By 1969, two PT-100-130 turbines of type "T-100-130" of the unit 2 started to operate, increasing heat distribution to 560 kcal/h (650 MW) and overall capacity to up to 300 MW. In 1974, the first block was combined with a second in close proximity, which had a capacity of 810 MW in four condensing power-generating units. The new Hrazdan State Regional Power Plant (SRPP) became, with 1110 MW total power, the most powerful power plant in Armenia of those times.

During its peak in the 1980s, the HTPP generated 6.85 TWh annually, with 7,300 hours (83%) clocked at total capacity. Between 1963 and the end of 2004, it produced 143 TWh electricity, but 12.3 Gcal/h energy in the form of heat.

In 2003, the HTPP was passed to the Russian Federation to pay off the Armenian debt, which was approximately US$31 million. The shares of the Hrazdan Energy Company went to the Federal Agency for State Property Management of Russia. In July 2009, all stocks minus one share were acquired by the Russian state-owned holding company Rosneftegaz. In May 2011, all shares were bought by Inter RAO UES. In 2015, Inter RAO UES sold the Hrazdan Energy Company to Cyprus-registered Liormand Holdings Limited, a part of Tashir Group owned by Samvel Karapetyan. The deal became fully in force in 2017.

In 1986, the plan of construction of four additional units (units 5–8) with a power generation capacity of 300 MW each was announced. Construction started in 1987, however, due to the dissolution of the Soviet Union the construction works were halted. In 2006, the assets of the incomplete unit 5 was sold to Armrosgazprom (now: Gazprom Armenia). The unit 5 as an independent power plant started operating in a pilot mode in January 2012, and since December 2013, it is in commercial operation.

== Technical description (units 1–4) ==
Located 1,715–1,730 metres (5,627–5,676 ft) above sea level, close to the junction of the Hrazdan River and Marmarik River, the power plant was built to accommodate inconstant and severe climate conditions.

Five oil and gas boilers are used to power four co-generation turbines, two of model PT-50-130/7 and two of model T-100-130. T-100-130 turbines have a capacity twice as big as of model PT-50-130/7, 100 MW of capacity. The plant has five evaporative cooling towers and six feed pumps.

The block part of the power plant consists of four power generator units, model TFM-104C gas and oil boilers with capacity of 670 t/h. TDC-250000/220 transformers connect two turbo-generators (TGV-200-2MUZ (Block No. 1) and TGV-200M (Blocks No. 2, 3, 4)) of 15.75 kV of voltage to 220 kV voltage circuit. The overall capacity is 810 MW.

The HTPP is considered as one of the most environmentally friendly non-nuclear TPPs in Armenia. In the aim of excluding any possibility of water loss connected with evaporation, a specially devised cooling system is used for cooling condensers in the four blocks. The cooling system, which was developed in Hungary by the firm MVM EGI, has a closed water circuit which gives an opportunity to use little natural water.

At the time when the coolers were being constructed, aluminum radiators were used as heat exchangers to cool down the circulating water which heats up in the condensers. The key part which enables the usage of resources is the placement of the radiators, which are located along the edge of the 120-metre (390 ft) cooling towers. Natural traction brings cooling air to the four towers. Heat loss is minimized by the use of chemically desalinated water in the closed circuit of cooling, which enables the usage of mixing condensers instead of surface condensers. This also reduces maintenance.

Since 1993, the HTTP has used natural gas as its primary fuel, relying on oil as a reserve: a reversal of its earlier pattern. A gas distributing station and gas grid carry gas to gas control points throughout the plant.

== Technical description (unit 5) ==
The fifth block's construction was directly connected to the Iran–Armenia gas pipeline construction, which has a vital strategic importance for Armenia. Particularly, according to the agreement, the energy produced in Hrazdan Thermal Power Plant's 5th energy block is exported to Iranian energy system and serves as a means of paying for natural gas imported from Iran.

Total of $465.2 million were spent for the construction and modernization of fifth energy block. For the construction of Hrazdan-5 different types of turbines were used, which work with steam and gas. The use of this technology enables the block to have a power output of 480 MW. The new technology of production enables the use of 278 gram of gas to produce 1 kWh energy, which reduces the cost of production. The construction was done by Gazprom Armenia.

== Role ==
80% of the electricity in Armenia is produced by four major energy producing companies: the Metsamor NPP, the Hrazdan TPP, the Sevan–Hrazdan Cascade, and the Vorotan Cascade. The HTPP is a balancing station providing energy in the case of deficit or shut down of the Metsamor nuclear facility, which is the primary source of power in Armenia. It closes for two to three months each year for maintenance and refueling, and HTPP steps in to meet consumer needs. The HTPP also plays a major role in the export of electricity.

== See also ==
- Energy in Armenia
