= List of major power stations in Liaoning province =

This article lists the major power stations located in Liaoning Province.

== Non-renewable ==
=== Coal-based ===
Station	Name in Chinese	Coordinates	Capacity (MW)	Operational units and (type)	Underconstructed units	Reference
Suizhong Power Station	绥中电厂	40°04′48″N 120°00′27″E	3,760	2×880 MW, 2×1,000 MW		
Tieling Power Station	铁岭电厂	42°20′40″N 123°48′15″E	2,400	4×300 MW, 2×600 MW		
Yingkou Power Station	营口电厂	40°18′17″N 122°06′17″E	1,840	2×320 MW, 2×600 MW		
Dalian Power Station	大连电厂	39°00′53″N 121°43′28″E	1,400	4×350 MW		
Fuxin Power Station	阜新电厂	41°59′52″N 121°39′43″E	1,400	2×350 MW	2×350 MW	
Shenxi Thermal Power Station	沈西热电厂	41°43′30″N 123°11′10″E	1,360	2x330 MW	2x 350MW	
Jinzhou Power Station	锦州电厂	41°16′16″N 121°14′57″E	1,320	2×660MW		
Dandong Jingshan Thermal Power Station	丹东金山热电厂	40°6′21″N 124°19′9″E	1,320	2×330 MW	1x 660MW	
Zhuanghe Power Station	庄河电厂	39°40′34″N 123°12′23″E	1,200	2×600 MW		
Kangping Power Station	康平电厂	42°42′02″N 123°21′54″E	1,200	2×600 MW		
Yanshanhu Power Station	燕山湖电厂	41°30′22″N 120°19′10″E	1,200	2×600 MW		
Dandong Power Station	丹东电厂	39°50′18″N 124°08′45″E	700	2×350 MW		
Chaoyang Thermal Power Station	朝阳热电电厂	41°36′50″N 120°25′26″E	700	2×350 MW		
Shendong Thermal Power Station	沈东热电厂	41°45′24″N 123°38′11″E	700	2×350 MW		
Benxi Thermal Power Station	本溪热电厂	41°20′51″N 123°48′46″E	700	2×350 MW		
Huludao Thermal Power Station	葫芦岛热电厂	40°44′48″N 120°57′44″E	700	2×350 MW		
Hongyang Energy Coal Gangue Power Station	红阳能源煤矸石热电项目	41°21′26″N 123°13′17″E	660	2×330 MW		
Diaobingshan Coal Gangue Power Station	铁岭调兵山煤矸石发电	42°29′37″N 123°34′1″E	600	2×300 MW		
Qinghe Power Station	清河电厂	42°31′45″N 124°08′22″E	600	1×600 MW		
Fuxin Jinshan Coal Gangue Power Station	金山煤矸石热电电厂	41°47′05″N 121°26′02″E	600	4×150 MW		
Datang Jinzhou Thermal Power Station	大唐锦州热电厂	41°08′24″N 121°12′57″E	600	2×300 MW		
Zhongdiantou Fushun Thermal Power Station	中电投抚顺热电厂	41°53′24″N 123°56′03″E	600	2×300 MW		
Fushun Thermal Power Station	抚顺热电厂	41°49′09″N 123°49′45″E	600	2×300 MW		
Liaoning Power Station	辽宁发电厂	41°55′19″N 124°05′31″E	400	2×200 MW		

=== Nuclear ===
Station	Name in Chinese	Coordinates	Capacity (MW)	Operational reactors and (type)	Under construction reactors	Planned reactors	Reference
Hongyanhe Nuclear Power Plant	红沿河核电站	39°47′52″N 121°28′19″E	6,400	6×1,060 MW			
Xudabu Nuclear Power Plant	徐大堡核电站	40°21′16″N 120°33′16″E	4,400		2×1,000 MW, 2×1,200 MW		

== Renewable ==
=== Hydroelectric ===
==== Conventional ====
Station	Name in Chinese	Coordinates	River	Total capacity (MW)	Dam height (meters)	Status	Operational units	Under construction units	Planned units
Shuifeng Hydro Power Station	水丰水电站	40°27′45″N 124°57′42″E	Yalu River	630	106	Operational*	7×90 MW		
Taipingwan Hydro Power Station	太平湾水电站	40°21′09″N 124°44′05″E	Yalu River	191	36.5	Operational**			
Hengren Hydro Power Station	桓仁水电站	41°17′22″N 125°23′48″E	Hun River	222.5	78.5	Operational*	2×75 MW, 1×72.5 MW		

* The power station is shared by China and North Korea, and operated by North Korea.
** The power station is shared by China and North Korea, and operated by China.

==== Pumped-storage ====
Station	Name in Chinese	Coordinates	Capacity (MW)	Rated head (meters)	Status	Operational units	Under construction units
Qingyuan Pumped-storage Hydro Power Station	清原抽水蓄能电站	42°07′56″N 124°40′56″E	1,800	390	Under construction		6×300 MW
Dayahe Pumped-storage Hydro Power Station	大雅河抽水蓄能电站	41°08′20″N 125°00′50″E	1,600	610.5	Under construction		4×400 MW
Pushihe Pumped Storage Power Station	蒲石河抽水蓄能电站	40°25′42″N 124°41′50″E	1,200	308	Operational	4×300 MW	
Xingcheng Pumped Storage Power Station	兴城抽水蓄能电站		1,200		Under construction		4×300 MW
Zhuanghe Pumped-storage Hydro Power Station	庄河抽水蓄能电站		1,000	222	Under construction		4×250 MW

== See also ==
- List of power stations in China
