= List of major power stations in Hebei province =

This page lists the major power stations located in Hebei Province.

== Non-renewable ==
=== Coal-based ===
Station	Name in Chinese	Coordinates	Capacity (MW)	Operational units and (type)	Under construction units
Cangdong Power Station	沧东电厂	38°18′36″N 117°52′43″E	3,840	2×600 MW, 4×660 MW	
Dingzhou Power Station	定州电厂	38°30′50″N 114°50′41″E	3,840	2×600 MW, 4×660 MW	
Xibaipo Power Station	西柏坡电厂	38°14′39″N 114°12′55″E	3,720	4×300 MW, 2×600 MW	2×660 MW
Zhuozhou Thermal Power Station	涿州热电厂	39°33′46″N 116°00′00″E	2,700	2×350 MW	2×1,000 MW
Qinhuangdao Thermal Power Station	中煤京能秦皇岛热电厂	39°55′28″N 119°22′44″E	2,640	2×660 MW	2×660 MW
Shang'an Power Station	上安电厂	38°03′26″N 114°11′45″E	2,620	2×350 MW, 2×300 MW, 2×660 MW	
Caofeidian Power Station	曹妃甸电厂	38°59′44″N 118°29′13″E	2,600	2×300 MW, 2×1000 MW	
Shalingzi Power Station	沙岭子电厂	40°39′28″N 114°56′42″E	2,400	8×300 MW	
Qinhuangdao Power Station	秦皇岛电厂	39°56′45″N 119°38′35″E	1,900	4×300 MW, 2×350 MW	
Langfang Power Station	廊坊热电厂	39°28′44″N 116°46′10″E	1,400	4×350 MW	
Handan Dongjia Thermal Power Station	邯郸东郊热电厂	36°34′13″N 114°38′57″E	1,400	2×350 MW	2×350 MW
Datang Baoding Thermal Power Station	大唐保定热电厂	38°51′36″N 115°24′20″E	1,400	2×350 MW	2×350 MW
Renqiu Power Station	任丘电厂	38°44′43″N 116°09′08″E	1,400	2×350 MW	2×350 MW
Shenneng Baoding Thermal Power Station	深能保定西北郊热电厂	38°57′43″N 115°22′5″E	1,360	2×350 MW, 1×660 MW	
Hanfeng Power Station	邯峰电厂	36°28′19″N 114°09′09″E	1,320	2×660 MW	
Weixian Power Station	蔚县电厂	39°48′45″N 114°38′13″E	1,320	2×660 MW	
Sanhe Power Station	三河电厂	39°57′09″N 116°50′50″E	1,300	2×350 MW, 2×330 MW	
Longshan Power Station	龙山电厂	36°35′53″N 113°41′28″E	1,200	2×600 MW	
Hengshui Power Station	衡水电厂	37°45′06″N 115°36′08″E	1,200	4×300 MW	
Shahe Power Station	沙河电厂	36°51′12″N 114°19′31″E	1,200	2×600 MW	
Wangtan Power Station	王滩电厂	39°12′00″N 118°58′25″E	1,200	2×600 MW	
Xingtai Thermal Power Station	邢台热电厂	36°58′10″N 114°37′28″E	700	2×350 MW	
Fengrun Huarun Power Station	华润电力丰润热电厂	39°35′41″N 118°04′27″E	700	2×350 MW	
Bohai Xinqu Power Station	渤海新区电厂	38°21′41″N 117°37′29″E	700	2×350 MW	
Chengde Power Station	承德电厂	40°48′18″N 118°03′37″E	700	2×350 MW	
Zunhua Thermal Power Station	遵化热电厂	40°04′38″N 117°58′40″E	700	2×350 MW	
Cangzhou Yundong Thermal Power Station	华润沧州运东热电厂	38°19′43″N 117°04′08″E	700	2×350 MW	
Tangshan North Thermal Power Station	唐山北郊电厂	39°42′39″N 118°13′00″E	700	2×350 MW	
Cangzhou Power Station	沧州热电厂	38°21′56″N 116°49′01″E	660	2×330 MW	
Huai'an Power Station	怀安热电厂	40°38′45″N 114°24′20″E	660	2×330 MW	
Fengrun Power Station	丰润热电厂	39°48′21″N 118°05′11″E	660	2×330 MW	
Luhua Thermal Power Station	鹿华热电厂	38°03′05″N 114°19′05″E	660	2×330 MW	
Datang Tangshan Thermal Power Station	大唐唐山热电厂	39°38′50″N 118°11′53″E	640	2×320 MW	
Xingtai Power Station	邢台电厂	37°00′30″N 114°29′04″E	600	2×300 MW	
Matou Power Station	马头电厂	36°29′08″N 114°25′27″E	600	2×300 MW	
Wu'an Power Station	武安电厂	36°49′06″N 114°11′13″E	600	2×300 MW	
Yuhua Thermal Power Station	裕华热电厂	37°57′06″N 114°30′50″E	600	2×300 MW	
Qingyuan Power Station	清苑热电厂	38°47′43″N 115°28′54″E	600	2×300 MW	
Kailuan Xiexin Power Station	开滦协鑫电厂	39°43′52″N 118°27′30″E	600	2×300 MW	
Douhe Power Station	陡河电厂	39°46′21″N 118°16′23″E	500	2×250 MW,	
Luanhe Power Station	滦河电厂	40°56′20″N 117°45′47″E	330	1×330 MW	

=== Natural gas based ===
Station	Name in Chinese	Coordinates	Capacity (MW)	Operational units and (type)	Underconstructed units
Shijizhuang Gas Power Station	石家庄燃机工程	38°03′43″N 114°31′27″E	800	2×400 MW	

=== Nuclear ===
Four nuclear power stations have been proposed in Hebei province:

- China National Nuclear Corporation (CNNC) plans to build Qinhuangdao Nuclear Power Station.
- China Guangdong Nuclear Power Group (CGNPC) plans to build Chengde Nuclear Power Station.
- China Huadian Corporation plans to build Cangzhou Nuclear Power Station.
- China Huaneng Group plans to build a nuclear power station around the Luan River downstream area close to Tangshan.

== Renewable ==
=== Hydroelectric ===
==== Conventional ====
Station	Name in Chinese	Coordinates	River	Capacity (MW)	Dam height (meters)	Status	Operational units	Under construction units
Panjiakou Hydro Power Station	潘家口水电站	40°23′18″N 118°16′42″E	Luan River	160	107.5	Operational	1×150 MW, 2×5 MW	

==== Pumped-storage ====
Station	Name in Chinese	Coordinates	Capacity(MW)	Rated head (meters)	Status	Operational units	Under construction units
Fengning Pumped Storage Power Station	丰宁抽水蓄能电站	41°40′40″N 116°29′47″E	3,600	425	Operational	12×300 MW	
Shangyi Pumped Storage Power Station	尚义抽水蓄能电站	40°45′19″N 114°20′53″E	1,400	449	Under construction		4×350 MW
Lingshou Pumped Storage Power Station	灵寿抽水蓄能电站		1,400	601	Under construction		4×350 MW
Fu'ning Pumped Storage Power Station	抚宁抽水蓄能电站	40°04′59″N 119°21′09″E	1,200	437	Under construction		4×300 MW
Yixian Pumped Storage Power Station	易县抽水蓄能电站		1,200	354	Under construction		4×300 MW
Xingtai Pumped Storage Power Station	邢台抽水蓄能电站		1,200	311	Under construction		4×300 MW
Luanping Pumped Storage Power Station	滦平抽水蓄能电站		1,200		Under construction		4×300 MW
Zhanghewan Pumped Storage Power Station	张河湾抽水蓄能电站	37°46′28″N 114°03′30″E	1,000	305	Operational	4×250 MW	
Qianxi Pumped Storage Power Station	迁西抽水蓄能电站		1,000		Under construction		4×250 MW
Xushui Pumped Storage Power Station	徐水抽水蓄能电站		600		Under construction		2×300 MW
Panjiakou Pumped Storage Power Station	潘家口抽水蓄能电站	40°23′18″N 118°16′42″E	270	71.6	Operational	3×90 MW	

=== Wind ===
Hebei has very rich resources of wind power. By the end of 2010, the total installed capacity was predicted to reach 3300 MW. Most wind farms are located close to Inner Mongolia and the shores of Bohai Sea.

Station	Name in Chinese	Coordinates	Operational capacity (MW)	Operational units	Under construction units
Zhangbei Lunaobao Wind Power Farm	张北绿脑包风电场		100.5	67×1.5 MW	67×1.5 MW
Zhangbei Baimiaotan Wind Power Farm	张北白庙滩风电		100	67×1.5 MW	67×1.5 MW

== See also ==
- List of power stations in China
