= List of power stations in Eritrea =

This article lists all power stations in Eritrea with more than 0.5 MW installed capacity. In addition, smaller stations do exist and small off-grid stations as well.

== Wind ==
Power station	Community	Coordinates	Turbines	Installed capacity	Completed	Owner
Assab wind farm	Assab	13.0412°N 42.7106°E	3	0.825 MW	2007	Eritrean Electricity; Authority

== Thermal ==
Power station	Community	Coordinates	Fuel type	Installed capacity	Completed	Owner	Notes
Hirgigo Oil Power Plant	hergigo	15.5333°N 39.4500°E	Heavy fuel oil	132 MW	2003	Eritrean Electricity; Authority	2003: 88 MW; 2014: 132 MW
Beleza Oil Power Plant	Asmara	15.4210°N 38.9222°E	Heavy fuel oil	17.1 MW	1995	Eritrean Electricity Authority	
Assab Oil Power Plant	Assab	12.9849°N 42.7304°E	Light diesel oil	8.7 MW	1988	Eritrean Electricity Authority	

== See also ==
- List of power stations in Africa
- List of largest power stations in the world
