= Yixun River =

River in Hebei, China

Coordinates: 40°57′N 117°44′E

The Yixun River (simplified Chinese: 伊逊河; traditional Chinese: 伊遜河; pinyin: Yīxùn Hé) is a subsidiary of Luan He, a river located in Hebei, a province of the People's Republic of China.

== History ==
Until the name was changed to Luan He during the Ming Dynasty, the original name of Yixun He was Suo Tou shu(索頭水).
