= List of power stations in Armenia =

This article lists all power stations in Armenia.

== Thermal ==
Station	Installed capacity (MW)	Year built
Hrazdan Thermal Power Plant - Units 1-4	1,110	1963-1966
Hrazdan Thermal Power Plant - Unit 5	480	2012
Yerevan Thermal Power Plant	242	2010

== Non-renewable ==
=== Nuclear ===
Station	Installed capacity (MW)	Year built	Status
Metsamor Nuclear Power Plant		1969-1980	
Armenia-1	407	1969-1976	Shut down
Armenia-2	440	1975-1980	Operational

== Renewable ==
=== Hydroelectric ===
Plant	Installed capacity (MW)	Year built
Sevan-Hrazdan Cascade	556	1936-1961
Sevan Hydro Power Plant	34.2	1949
Atarbekyan Hydro Power Plant (Hrazdan)	81.6	1959
Gyumush Hydro Power Plant (Argel)	224	1953
Arzni Hydro Power Plant	70.5	1956
Kanaker Hydro Power Plant	102	1936
Yerevan 1 Hydro Power Plant	44	1961
Vorotan Cascade	405.46	1970-1984
Spandaryan Hydro Power Plant	76	1984
Shamb Hydro Power Plant	171	1977
Tatev Hydro Power Plant	157.2	1970

=== Geothermal ===
Station	Town	Coordinates	Capacity (MW)	Notes
Jermaghbyur Geothermal Power Plant	Jermaghbyur		150	Proposed

== See also ==
- Electricity sector in Armenia
- List of power stations in Asia
- List of power stations in Europe
- List of largest power stations in the world
