= List of power stations in Algeria =

This article lists all power stations in Algeria.

== Gas ==
Plant	Community	Coordinates	Type	Capacity (MW)	Year completed	Refs
el balara jijel				108	1978	
Berrouaghia	Medea			500	2006	
F'Kirina	Oum el-Bouaghi			300	2004	
Hadjret En-Nouss	Tipaza			1260	2009	
Hamma	Alger			418	2002	
Hassi Messaoud Norte	Ouargla			200	1998	
Kahrama	Oran			318	2005	
Koudiet Eddraouch	El-Tarf			1200	2013	
Marsat El Hadjadj				200	2007	
Skikda				880	2006	
Ain Zada (Aïn Arnat)	Sétif			1015	2017	

== Hydroelectric ==
Hydroelectric station	Community	Coordinates	Type	Capacity	Year completed	Name of reservoir	River
Ighil Emda	Kherrata, Bejaia			24	1954	Barrage d'Ighil Emda	Agrioum

== Integrated solar combined cycle ==
- Hassi R'Mel – the steam generated integrates into the steam cycle of a 150MW combined cycle gas turbine plant

== See also ==
- List of largest power stations in the world
- List of power stations
- List of power stations in Africa
