= Huaneng Yingkou Power Station =

Power station in China

Huaneng Yingkou Power Station 华能营口电厂
- Country: China
- Location: Yingkou
- Coordinates: 40°18′17″N 122°06′17″E
- Status: Operational
- Commission date: June 1995
- Owner: Huaneng Power International

Thermal power station
- Primary fuel: Coal

Power generation
- Units operational: 2 × 320 MW; 2 × 600 MW
- Nameplate capacity: 1,840 MW
- Capacity factor: 73.07 %

The Huaneng Yingkou Power Station (Chinese: 华能营口电厂) is a large thermal power station in China, with installed capacity of 1,840 MW. As of 2016, the plant is installed with two 320 MW units, and two 600 MW units, totalling to 1,840 MW.

The station is fuelled by coal, with an efficiency rate of 330.5 grams consumed for each KWh generated. In 2007 planned capacity was 4,840 MW.

Nearby Huaneng Yingkou Co-generation Power Plant is a combined heat and power station with installed capacity 660 MW consisting of two 330 MW generating units, which commenced operation in December 2009.

Adjacent Yingkou Co-generation Photovoltaic Power Plant is a 10 MW photovoltaic power station that commenced operation in June 2016.

== See also ==
- List of coal power stations
