= List of power stations in Eswatini =

This article lists all power stations in Eswatini.

== Hydroelectric ==
Hydroelectric station	Community	Coordinates	Type	Capacity	Year completed	Name of reservoir	River
Maguga Power Station			Reservoir	19 MW	2006	Maguga Reservoir	Komati River
Ezulwini Hydropower Station			Reservoir	20 MW			Lusushwana River
Maguga Power Station			Reservoir	15 MW			
Edwaleni Hydropower Station			Reservoir	11.2 MW			

== Solar ==
Solar power station	Community	Coordinates	Fuel type	Technology	Capacity (MW)	Year completed	Owner
Buckswood House 100kW Solar Power Plant			Solar				
Eswatini Electricity Company Lavumisa 10MW solar plant			Solar				

== See also ==
- List of power stations in Africa
- List of largest power stations in the world
