= List of cooling towers at UK power stations =

This is a historical list of cooling towers associated with UK public electricity supply power stations. The list includes both wooden and reinforced concrete (RC) hyperboloid cooling towers. Spray ponds and finned tube cooling arrays are not included.

== Background ==
Power station cooling towers are used where there is insufficient water available from a source, e.g. a river or lake, to meet the cooling requirements of the power station. Cooling towers have been a feature of towns and cities since the 1900s and of the Midlands, Lancashire and South Yorkshire landscapes (particularly along the River Trent and the River Ouse) since the late 1950s.

From their peak numbers in the 1950s, there are now significantly fewer power stations with cooling towers. This has been driven by the demolition of urban power stations and of older, less efficient, stations. In 1966 there were 241cooling towers in operation; by 1984 this had fallen to 139 towers. Privatisation of the electricity industry in 1990 increased the rate of demolition, as further low efficiency power stations were decommissioned. The phasing out of coal for fueling power stations has virtually eliminated cooling towers from the UK landscape.

== List of cooling towers at UK power stations ==
Cooling tower capacity is given in millions of UK gallons per hour (mgph) of cooling water flow; 1 mgph = 1.263 m^{3}/s.

Power station	Cooling tower(s): number, type, capacity and manufacturer	Constructed	Demolished
Acton Lane A B	5 × wood, 1 × RC Davenport, total 5.545 mgph 2 × 2.25 mgph Kier	1946 1954–58	1983
Agecroft B and C	2 × 3.08 mgph Mouchel	1950-62	1994
Ashford B	1 × 0.16 mgph induced draft	1954-55	1989
Barrow-in-Furness	3 × wood, total 0.45 mgph, 1 × concrete 1.0 mgph	1899	1962
Beckenham	1 × 0.1 mgph Premier		
Blackburn	1 × 1.8 mgph Davenport 1 × 2.25 mgph	1942-43. 1952	1976
Blackburn Meadows	3 × concrete, 4 × wood total 10.5 mgph	1931-33	2008
Blackpool	3 = 1.055 mgph		
Bold A B	2 × 2.8 mgph 3 × 2.75 mgph	1950-53 1953-	1981 1992
Bolton	1 ×2.5 mgph Mouchel RC	1923	1979
Bradford	12 × timber total 5.335 mgph, 1× 1.25 mgph RC	1925-49	1976
Brimsdown B	5 ×1.32 mgph + 2 × 1.56 mgph	1928-55	1976
Bristol	2 × wood 0.9 mgph Film	1928	1959
Bury	2 × 0.25 mgph Peter Brotherhood	1930	1970
Cardiff	2 × 2.2 mgph RC 2 × wood 0.24 mgph	1922-43	1970
Castle Donington	4 × 4.5 mgph	1951-58	1994
Chadderton A B	6 × chimney type 1.8 mgph Premier 3 × 3.5 mgph Fred Mitchell	1929 1950	1982
Connah's Quay	3 × 2.5 mgph	-1957	1992
Cottam	8 × RC, each 6.75 mgph, 114 m high, Film	1964-70	2025
Coventry	4 × 0.6 mgph, 2 × 0.75 mgph, 1 × 1.5 mgph	1928, 1938, 1941	1976
Croydon A B	7 × wood, 3 × concrete total 4.285 mgph 6 × 2.5 mgph	1924 1947-	1974
Darlington	1 × Mouchel, 2 × Davenport, total 3.15 mgph	1940-43	1976
Didcot	6 × 11.4 m^{3}/s, RC 114 m high 91 m diam. Film	1965-70	2014, 2019
Drakelow C	6 × RC, 110 m high	1961-63	2006
Drax	12 × RC, 114 m high 92 m diam. Bierrum	1967-71, 1979–86	Operational
Eggborough	8 × RC, 90 m high Davenport	1962-67	2021
Ferrybridge C	8 × RC, 115 m high, Film	1961-67	2019, 2022
Fiddler's Ferry	8 × RC, 114 m high	1967-71	2023 (part)
Fleetwood	2 × 3.0 mgph	1950-55	1981
Folkestone	3 × Davenport, total 0.348 mgph	1922-26	1960
Frome	2 × wood total 0.195 mgph Davenport		
Goldington	4 ×1.2 mgph RC	1951-58	1986
Greenhill	5 × chimney type 1.35 mgph Premier	1924	1960
Grimsby	3 × wood, 3 × concrete, total 2.47 mgph Film, Davenport, Henshaw, Mitchell	1924-39	Late 1960s
Grove Road	14, total 5.424 mgph	1902	1969
Hackney B	1 × 2.25 mgph wood	1954-57	1976
Halifax	6, total 2.9 mgph	1950s	Late 1960s
Hams Hall A B C	6 × 2.66 mgph Henshaw, Mitchell 4 × 5.0 mgph Michell 3	1929-39 1942–49 1958	1978 1985 1993
Hartshead	1 ×2.75 mgph, 1 × 2.5 mgph Davenport	1927-49	1979
High Marnham	5 × RC, total 27 mgph	1955-59	2012
Horden	2 Premier, total 0.499 mgph		
Huddersfield	3 × 2.6 mgph Davenport	1938-55	1981
Huncoat	2 × 3 mgph Film	1947-55	1988
Ince	4 × 2.75 mgph	1957	1999
Islington	10, total 1.837 mgph		
Ironbridge B	4 × RC Film	1963-68	2019
Kirkstall	2 × 2.5 mgph Davenport	1930-43	1976
Kearsley B C	3 × 2.82 mgph Mitchell 2 ×2.82 mgph Mitchell		1980
Kendal	1 × 0.06 mgph Frodingham		
Letchworth	2 × 0.42 mgph Mouchel		1976
Lincoln	6 × 0.67 mgph RC		1977
Lister Drive	5 × Henshaw RC, total 2.615 mgph	1926-28	1981
Llynfi	1 × 2.5 mgph 1 × 3.0 mgph	1942-48	After 1977
Luton	2 × 1.0 mgph Mouchel RC	1901	1969
Lydney	1 × concrete, 1 × wood, total 0.95 mgph	1923	1967
Macclesfield	1 × 0.03 mgph Davenport	1955	Late 1960s
Manchester (Stuart Street)	4 × Davenport, 1 × Mouchel, total 8.0 mgph	1949	1976
Marchwiel	3 × 0.255 mgph, wood Davenport,1 × 0.3 mgph RC	1950	1960
Meaford A B	2 × 2.8 mgph Davenport 3 × 3.15 mgph	1945-47 1951–57	1976 1991
Mexborough	2 × Mitchell, total 2.68 mgph		1981
Nechells A Nechells B	35 wood total 6.057 mgph Davenport 3 × 4.0 mgph RC Mitchell	1948-53	1984
Neepsend	3 × 3.5 mgph	1936-50	1976
Northampton	1 × Mouchel, 1 × Moss, total 4.0 mgph		1976
Ocker HIll	2 × 1.6 mgph, 1 × 2.376 mgph	1956	1978
Padiham B	2 × 3.6 mgph	1957-	1993
Ratcliffe-on-Soar	8 × RC Bierrum	1963-67	On going (2026)
Richborough	3 × RC	1958-62	2012
Rogerstone	2 × 2.25 mgph	1955-58	1991
Rotherham	2 × 1.875 mgph Michell		1978
Rugeley B	4 × RC Bierrum	1964-70	2021
Rye House	3 × 1.3 mgph Davenport	1947-53	1982
St. Helens	6 × wood, total 1.11 mgph		Late 1960s
St. Marylebone	4 × Klein, total 3.14 mgph		
Sculcoates	9 × wood Davenport, total 3.24 mgph, 1 × 2.5 mgph Mouchel RC	1927-46	1976
Skelton Grange A B	3 × 3.25 mgph 4 × 3.8 mgph	1946-51 1958–60	1983 1995
Stockport	3, total 2.8 mgph		1976
Stoke-on-Trent	7 × Davenport wood, total 1.783 mgph	1919-29	1975
Sunderland	1 × 1.65 mgph RC, 1 × 1.25 mgph wood	1925-26, 1942	1976
Taylor's Lane	2 × RC, 4 × wood, total 3.905 mgph	1904-64	1972
Thanet	2 × Davenport, total 0.448 mgph		1964
Thornhill	2 × 3.0 mgph RC	1950-54	1982
Thorpe Marsh	4 × RC Film	1959-63	2012
Tunbridge Wells	3 × wood, total 0.62 mgph	1924-28	
Upper Boat	1 × 2.25 mgph RC	1904	1976
Wakefield B	2 × 3.75 mgph Davenport		
Walsall	6 × 1.6 mgph Mitchell	1949	1982
Walthamstow	5 × wood, total 1.115 mgph		
Watford	2 × 0.25 mgph Film, 1 × 0.2 mgph Davenport		1969-70
West Burton	8 × RC, each 6.75 mgph Davenport	1961-67	On-going (2026)
West Ham B	2 × 2.8 mgph Kier	1947-49	1984
Westwood	2 × 3.0 mgph Michell	1949-53	1989
Willington A and B	5 × RC	1953-61	Extant
York	1 × 1 mgph Mouchel	1941-56	1976
Accrington	4 × wood Brotherhood, total 0.98 mgph	1921-27	Before 1960
Barugh	2 × Davenport 0.5 mgph		1958
Blaydon	2 = 0.222 mgph		Before 1960
Bonnybridge	2 × Davenport RC 1.5 mgph, 2 × wood 0.175 mgph		Before 1960
Clyde's Mill	2 × 1.5 mgph		Before 1960
Faversham	Visco 0.01 mgph		Before 1960
Horsham	0.032 mgph		Before 1960
Ilford	2 × 0.32 mgph		Before 1960
Kettering	3 × Davenport 0.529 mgph		Before 1960
Kilmarnock	1 × Davenport 1 × Mouchel total 1.85 mgph		Before 1960
Leicester	6 × Mitchel 4.2 mgph, 2 × Concrete Piling 1.35 mgph	1928-39, 1959–50	
Little Barford	1 × FCT 2.5 mgph		
Maidstone	1 × 0.32 mgph		Before 1960
Middlesbrough	Davenport wood 0.12 mgph		Before 1960
Port Sunlight	1 × 0.7 mgph Davenport RC		Before 1960
Ramsgate	2 × 0.225 mgph		1958
Rawtenstall	1 × 0.22 mgph Premier		Before 1960
Scarborough	2 × wood 0.34 mgph Premier		Before 1960
Southport	2 × 0.3 mgph Brotherhood		
Southwark	2 × wood Davenport 0.75 mgph		Before 1960
Swindon	4 × Davenport 3 wood; 1 RC total 1.75 mgph		Before 1960
Weston-super-Mare	1 × Balcke 0.08 mgph, 1 × Davenport 0.2 mgph		Before 1960

== See also ==
- List of power stations in Scotland
- List of power stations in Wales
- List of power stations in England
- List of power stations in Northern Ireland
- Film Cooling Towers Limited
