= Goldington Power Station =

Former power station in England

- Country: England UK
- Location: Bedford Bedfordshire
- Coordinates: 52°08′15″N 00°25′39″W
- Status: Decommissioned and demolished
- Construction began: 1951
- Commission date: June 1955
- Decommission date: October 1983
- Owners: British Electricity Authority (1950–1955); Central Electricity Authority (1955–1957); Central Electricity Generating Board (1958–1987)
- Operator: As owner
- Employees: 240-250

Thermal power station
- Primary fuel: Pulverised coal
- Secondary fuel: Oil for start-up
- Site area: 18 hectare
- Chimneys: 2 (91 m tall)
- Cooling towers: 4
- Cooling source: Recirculating water, river water, cooling towers

Power generation
- Units operational: 6 × 30 MW
- Make and model: British Thomson-Houston
- Units decommissioned: 6 × 30 MW
- Nameplate capacity: 180 MW
- Annual net output: (See graph below)

Goldington Power Station was a 180 MW coal-fired electricity generating station located to the east of Bedford in Bedfordshire, England. It was commissioned in 1955 and closed in 1983 and was demolished during 1984–87.

== History ==
The Corporation of Bedford obtained legal powers under the Bedford Electric Lighting Order 1890, confirmed by the Electric Lighting Orders Confirmation (No. 3) Act 1890 (53 & 54 Vict. c. clxxxviii), to generate and supply electricity throughout the town. Electricity was first generated in the Bedford Power Station at Prebend Street Bridge Bedford on 6 December 1894. In 1897 the station generated 342.35 MWh and sold this to 325 customers with a total of 12,832 lamps and 352 public lamps. Electricity was sold at 6d. per kWh which provided an income to the corporation of £4,718. This small station (19 megawatt (MW) in 1948–53) was operational until 1966.

In 1923 the (AC) generating plant comprised 2 × 275 kW and 1 × 500 kW reciprocating generators plus 1 × 1.0 MW and 2 × 1.5 MW turbo generators, these provided a 105 V and 210 V AC supply. The boilers had a combined evaporative capacity of 134,000 lb/hr (16.88 kg/s). The total amount of electricity sold was 5.147 MWh (1921), 4.611 MWh (1922) and 4.664 MWh (1923). This generated a revenue of £72,708 (1922) and £60,440 (1923).

Goldington Power Station

The power station was originally planned by the Bedford Corporation but became responsibility of the British Electrical Authority. The Ministry of Fuel and Power granted consent for 60 MW of electricity generating plant at Goldington about 3 km east of Bedford in June 1950. The consent was increased to 180 MW in August 1951. It was constructed over the period 1951–58.

Bedford Power Station electricity output 1946–63, GWh
Year	1946	1955	1956	1957	1958	1959	1961	1962	1963
Station output, GWh	33.96	16.238	14.990	12.130	5.069	1.363	0.799	3.66	8.13

== Specification and operation ==
The site at Goldington was chosen because it was remote from built-up areas; was adjacent to a railway for the delivery of coal and the disposal of ash; and was close to an ample water source for cooling the plant. The site was liable to flooding from the River Great Ouse therefore the area was raised in level prior to construction of the power station. Reinforced concrete piles were used for load-bearing areas.

The consultants were Sir Alexander Gibb & Partners and Merz & McLellan. The principal civil engineering contractors were Mitchell Construction Co. Ltd., Bierrum and Partners Ltd, and Film Cooling Towers Ltd. The first generator was commissioned in June 1955, then September 1955, November 1956, December 1956, June 1957 and the final set in March 1958.

The power station had an installed electricity generating capacity of 180 MW and comprised six 30 MW British Thomson-Houston turbo-alternators. The six 300,000 lb/hr Clarke Chapman boilers burning pulverised coal – up to 250 tonnes an hour - at a pressure of 600 psi (41.4 bar) and 454 °C. In 1961 the thermal efficiency of the station was 26.56 per cent.

Water was abstracted from the river and used for steam condensing and cooling. There were four reinforced concrete cooling towers on the east of the station site. Up to 6 million gallons an hour (7.58 m^{3}/s) of water was abstracted from the River Great Ouse via a 720 ft (220 m) channel off the river near the railway bridge. Goldington used a mixed cooling system: some river water was used in the cooling process and returned to the river 225 m downstream of the intake and some warmed water was pumped to the cooling towers and used again for cooling. The cooling towers each has a capacity of 1.2 million gallons per hour (1.514 m^{3}/s). A survey in August and September 1968 found that the river was 10.4 °C warmer downstream of Goldington power station than upstream due to the heat input from the station.

Coal was initially supplied via a dedicated siding off the Bedford to Cambridge railway line. The open coal store was to the south of the station site. The railway line from Bedford to Goldington power station was retained when the remainder of the line to Cambridge was closed in January 1968. The power station siding was not used after 1979 and coal was instead delivered by lorry. The line from Bedford St. Johns to Goldington was closed in April 1981.

The 132 kV connection to the national grid was at a switching compound on the north side of the power station.

Output in GWh over the operational life of the station

In 1958 the Bedford electricity district supplied an area of 200 square miles and a population of 117,000. The amount of electricity sold and the number and types of consumers was as follows:

Year	Electricity sold, MWh	No. of consumers
1956	188,683	36,832
1957	207,498	37,865
1958	230,066	38,845

In 1958 the above totals were made up of the following:

Type of Consumer	No. of consumers	Electricity sold, MWh
Domestic	34,312	71,387
Commercial	2,434	22,567
Combined	4,799	4,799
Farms	655	4,333
Industrial	414	125,148
Public lighting	25	1,832
Total	38,845	230,066

== Closure ==
The station closed in October 1983. The four cooling towers were demolished in 1986 and the 300 ft (91.5 metre) high chimneys in March 1987. By 1996 the power station site had been redeveloped as housing. The station was located off Barkers Lane on what is now Riverfield Drive.
