= Iran–Armenia gas pipeline =

Location
- Country: Iran, Armenia
- Direction: south–north
- Start: Tabriz, Iran
- To: Sardarian, Armenia

General information
- Type: natural gas
- Partners: National Iranian Oil Company, Gazprom Armenia
- Commissioned: 2006

Technical information
- Length: 140 km (87 mi)
- Maximum discharge: 2.3 billion cubic meters per year

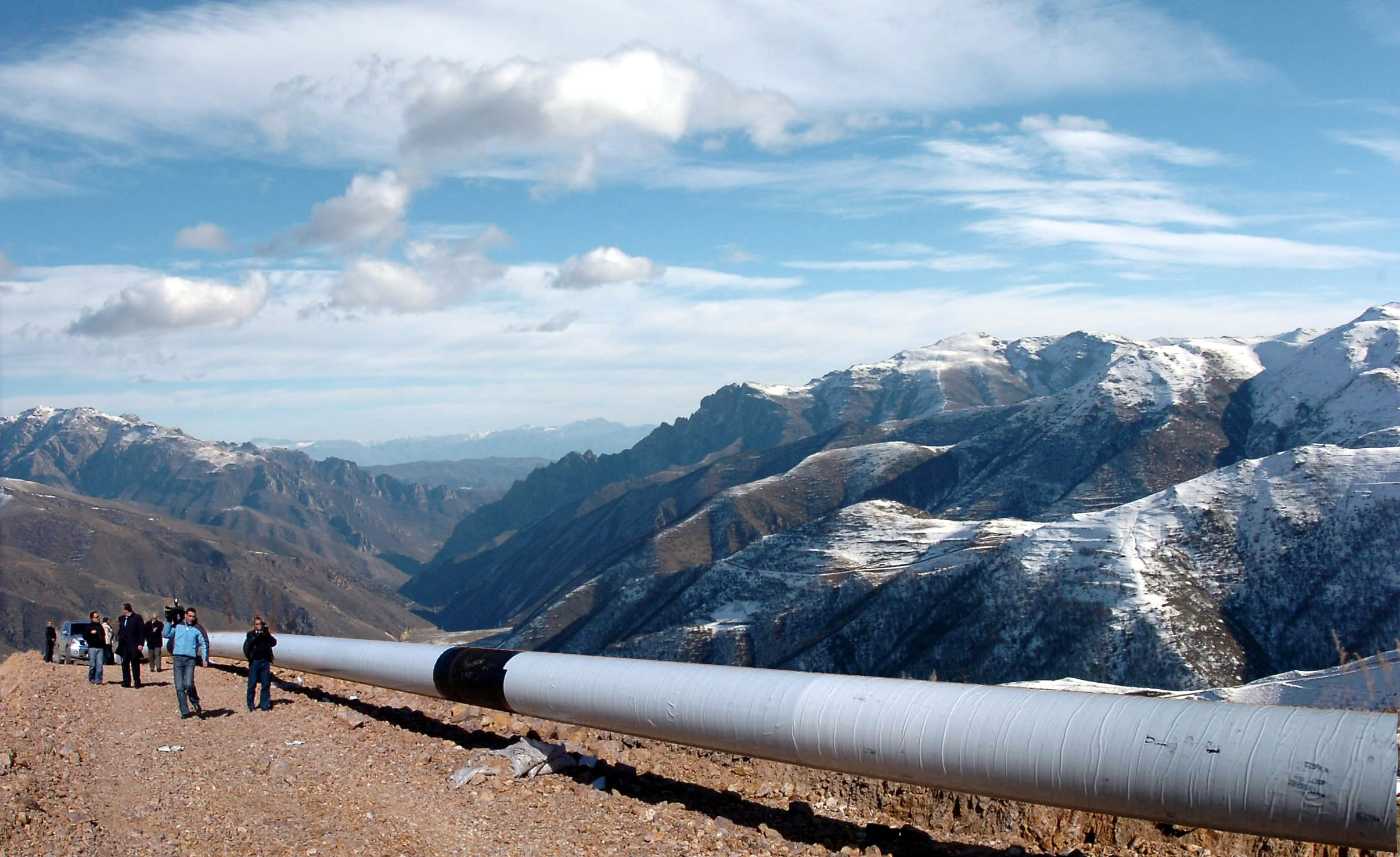
Iran-Armenia gas pipeline

The Iran–Armenia gas pipeline is a 140-kilometre (87 mi) long pipeline from Iran to Armenia. The 100-kilometre (62 mi) long Iranian section runs from Tabriz to the Iran–Armenia border. The Armenian section runs from the Meghri region to Kajaran, and another 197 kilometres (122 mi) of pipeline is planned to reach the center of the country, where it will link up with the existing distribution network.

== History ==
The plans to build the pipeline for Iranian gas to flow into Armenia were initially announced on 15 April 2002 by Armenian Energy Minister Armen Movsisian. It started operations on 20 December 2006, and was officially inaugurated by the Presidents Mahmoud Ahmadinejad of Iran and Robert Kocharyan of Armenia on 19 March 2007. There are discussions to build a second pipeline from Iran to Armenia.

== Technical features ==
The pipeline diameter is 700 millimetres (28 in) and it cost about US$220 million. The initial capacity of pipeline is 1.1 billion cubic meters (bcm) of natural gas per year, which will be increased up to 2.3 bcm by 2019. The contract was signed for 20 years. For each cubic meter of the Iranian gas, Armenia is supposed to return 3 kwh of electric energy to Iran.

== Political controversy ==
Many suspect that the pipeline's diameter was reduced from 1,420 to 700 millimetres (56 to 28 in) under pressure from Gazprom, which purchased a majority share in the Armenian section of the pipeline through its subsidiary, Armrosgazprom. If the pipeline had been built at the initial diameter, it would have allowed Iran to export to markets in Europe, therefore competing with Russia's own natural gas industry. Analysts argue that the pipeline was in part intended to extend Iran's influence in Caucasus, however was subdued due to Russian control before the construction ended.

On 11 November 2009, Armenian officials reported an explosion of some segment of the pipeline within the Armenian borders. Once the damage is repaired, Iran will resume flow of gas to Armenia.

== See also ==
- Iran–Armenia relations
