= Luan River =

River in China

Coordinates: 39°25′48″N 119°18′12″E

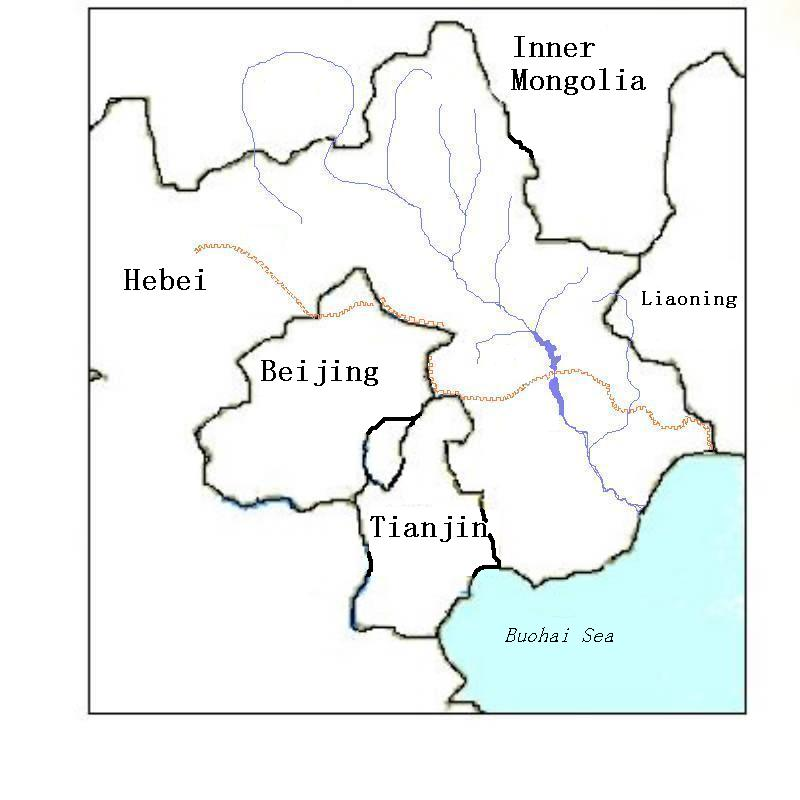
Luan River basin

The Luan River (Chinese: 滦河; pinyin: Luánhé, formerly known as Lei Shui, or Ru Shui) is a river in China.

== River ==
The river flows northwards from its source in the province of Hebei into the province of Inner Mongolia, and then flows southeast back into Hebei to its mouth on the Bohai Sea. The headstream is known as Shandian River. This part of the river flows near the ancient Mongol Yuan dynasty capital city of Shangdu. Another important settlement in this section is Duolun. From here, the river's course turns to the southeast. Its length is about 600 km. One subsidiary is the Yixun He, which runs through Hebei.

During its course, the Luan also passes by the Great Wall. After Chengde, the river is navigable. The largest city along the river's course is Chengde.

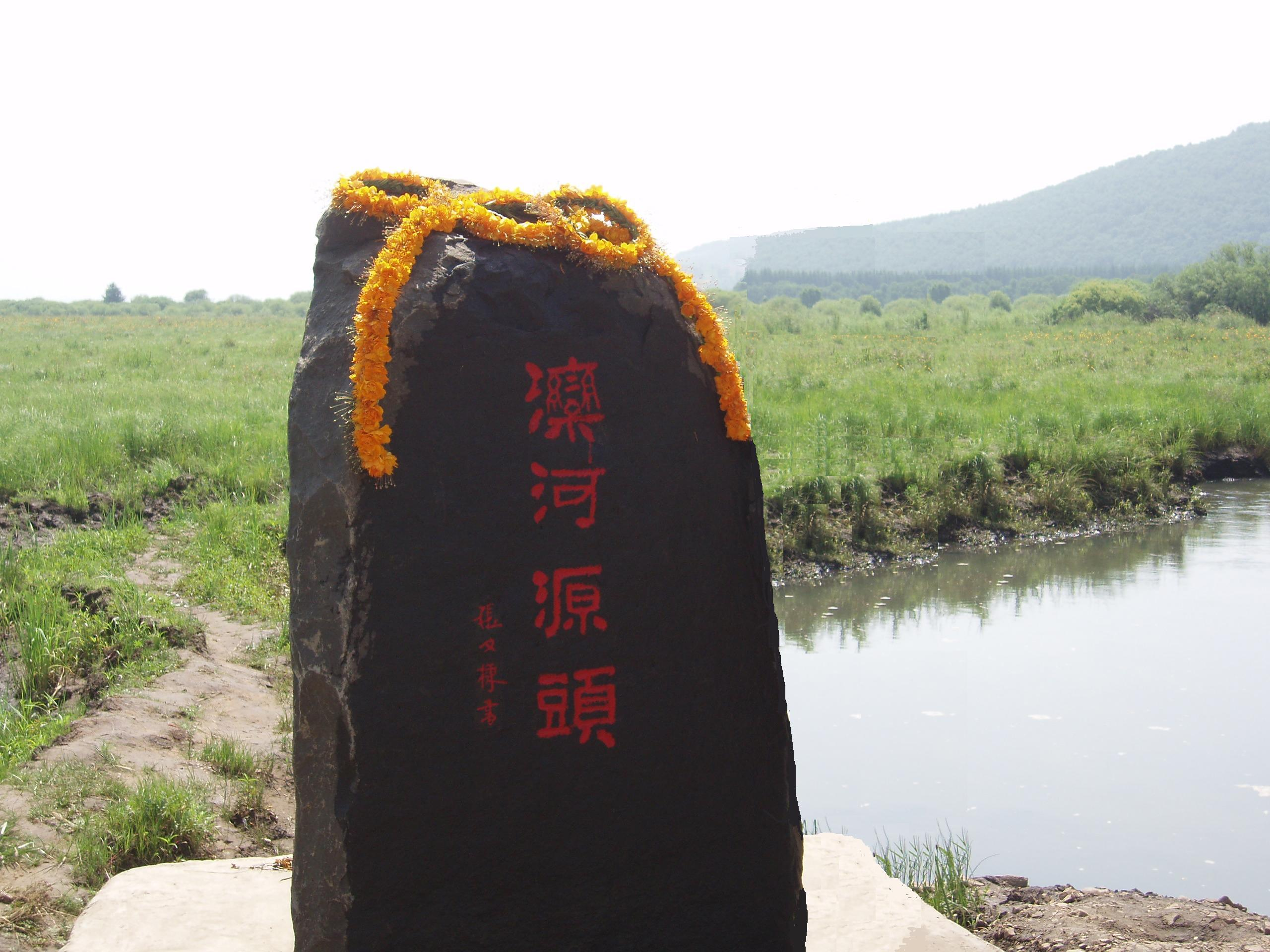
Fountainhead of Luan River

== Impact crater ==
Geological evidence such as the presence of suevite suggests there is an impact crater in the area. It is estimated to be between 70 and 170 km in diameter with an age of 129 ± 3 Ma. The circular course of Luan River as it goes from Inner Mongolia back to Hebei is said to define part of the crater's outline.
