= Outline of Armenia =

Country in the South Caucasus region of Eurasia

The flag of Armenia

The coat of arms of Armenia

The location of Armenia

Flag map of Armenia

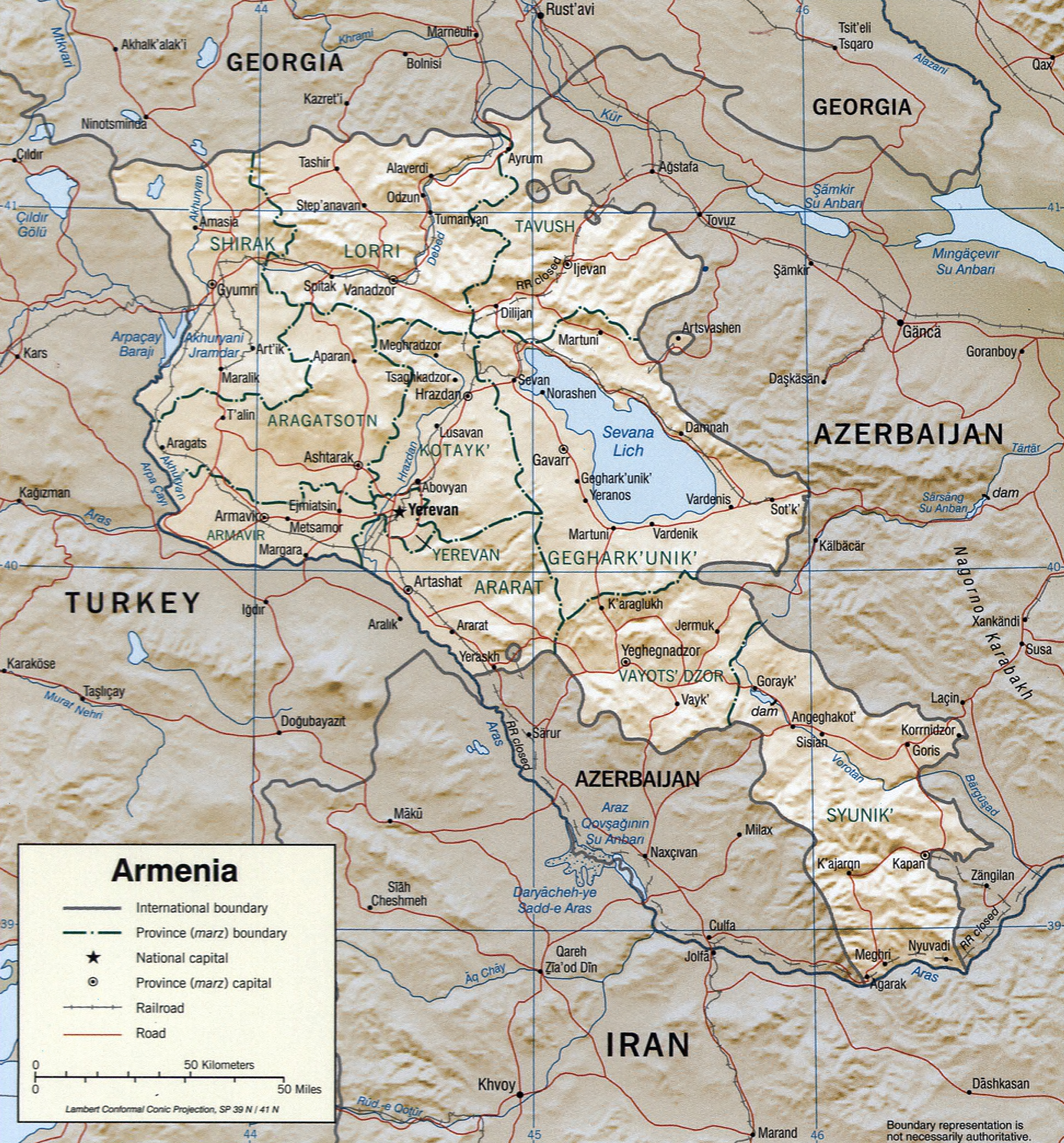
An enlargeable relief map of Armenia

The following outline is provided as an overview of and topical guide to Armenia:

Armenia, officially the Republic of Armenia, is a landlocked country in the Armenian highlands of West Asia. It is a part of the Caucasus region and is bordered by Turkey to the west, Georgia to the north, Azerbaijan to the east, and Iran and the Azerbaijani exclave of Nakhchivan to the south. Yerevan is the capital, largest city and financial center.

== General reference ==
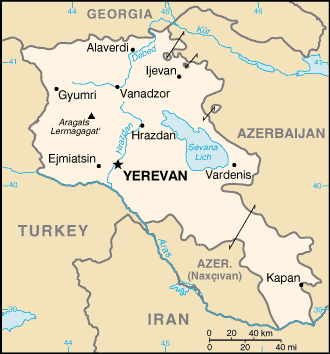
An enlargeable basic map of Armenia

- Pronunciation: /ɑːrˈmiːniə/
- Common English country name: Armenia
- Official English country name: Republic of Armenia
- Common endonym(s): Հայաստան (Hayastan)
- Official endonym(s): Հայաստանի Հանրապետություն (Hayastani Hanrapetut’yun)
- Adjectival(s): Armenian
- Demonym(s): Armenian
- Etymology: Name of Armenia
- International rankings of Armenia
- ISO country codes: AM, ARM, 051
- ISO region codes: See ISO 3166-2:AM
- Internet country code top-level domain: .am

== Geography of Armenia ==
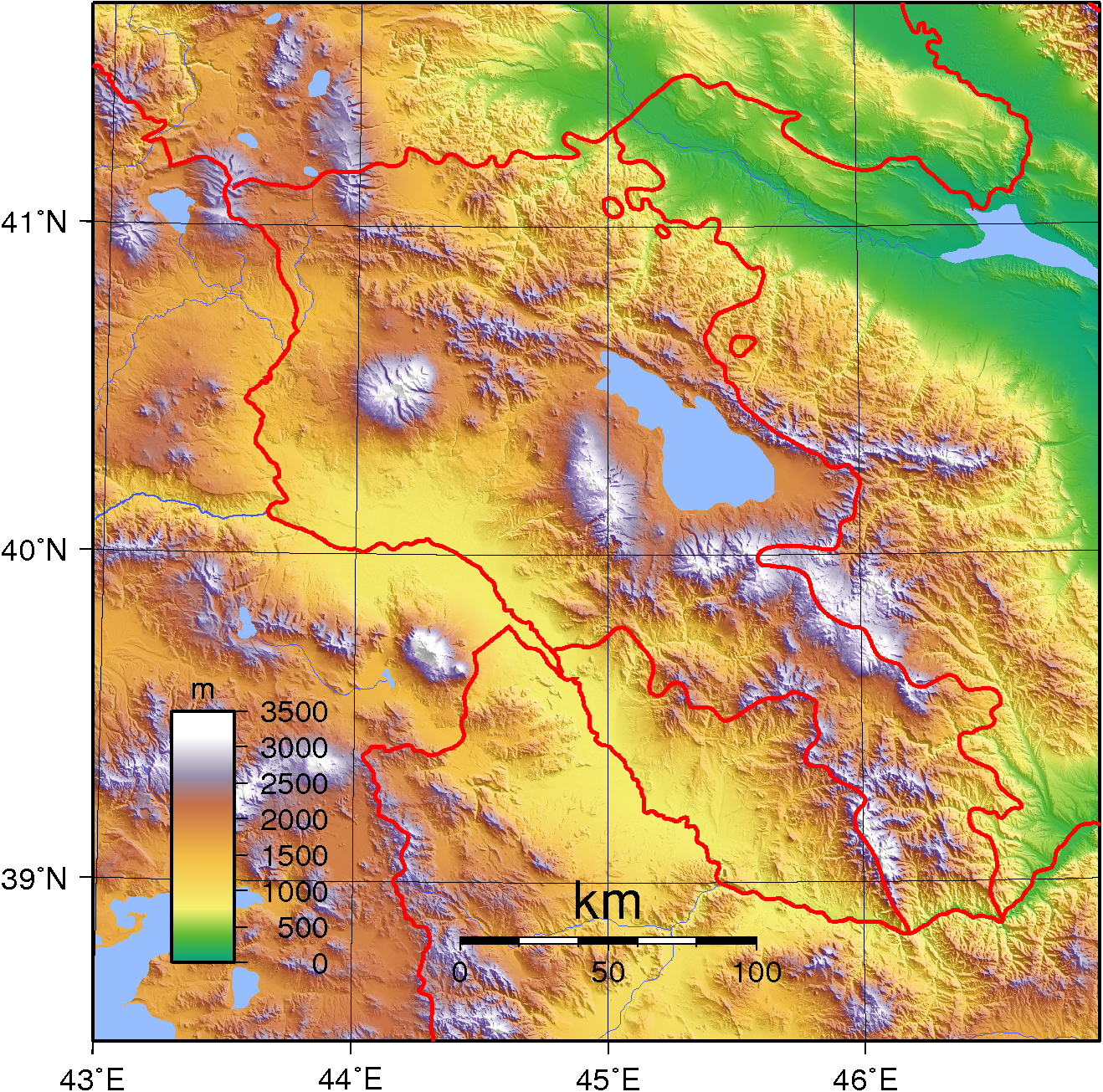
An enlargeable topographic map of Armenia

- Location:
  - Northern Hemisphere and Eastern Hemisphere
    - Eurasia
      - Caucasus
        - South Caucasus
    - Europe
      - Eastern Europe
        - Caucasus
          - South Caucasus
- Time zone
  - Armenia Time
    - UTC+04:00
- Extreme points of Armenia
  - High: Mount Aragats 4,090 m (13,419 ft)
  - Low: Debed 400 m (1,312 ft)
- Population of Armenia: 3,231,900 – 134th most populous country
- Area of Armenia: 29,800 square kilometres (11,500 sq mi) – 142nd largest country
- Atlas of Armenia

=== Neighbours of Armenia ===
Land boundaries: 1,254 km

Azerbaijan 787 km
Turkey 268 km
Georgia 164 km
Iran 35 km

Coastline: none

=== Environment of Armenia ===
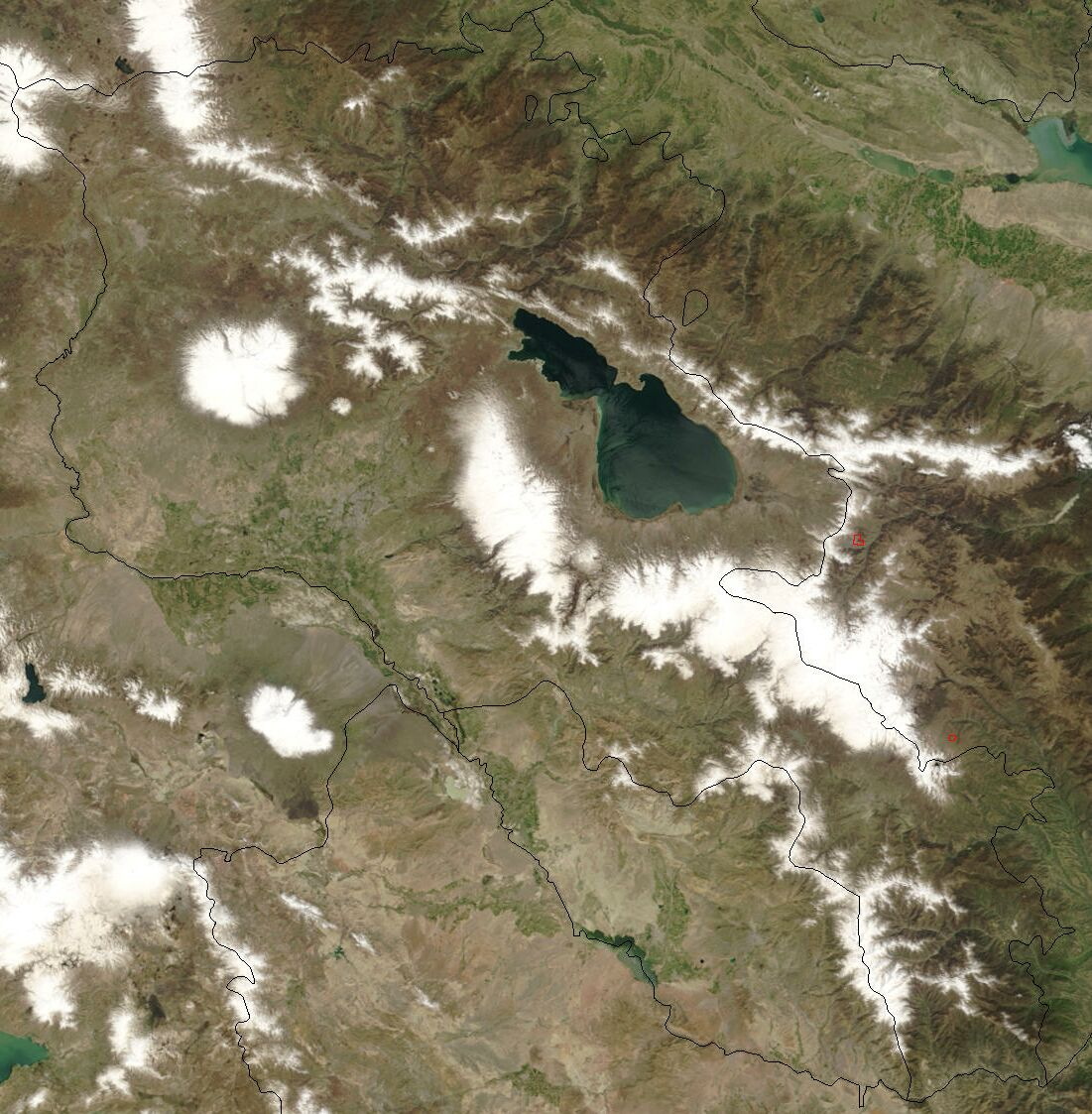
An enlargeable satellite image of Armenia

- Climate of Armenia
- Geology of Armenia
- Protected areas of Armenia
  - National parks of Armenia
- Wildlife of Armenia
  - Fauna of Armenia
    - Birds of Armenia
    - Mammals of Armenia

==== Natural geographic features of Armenia ====
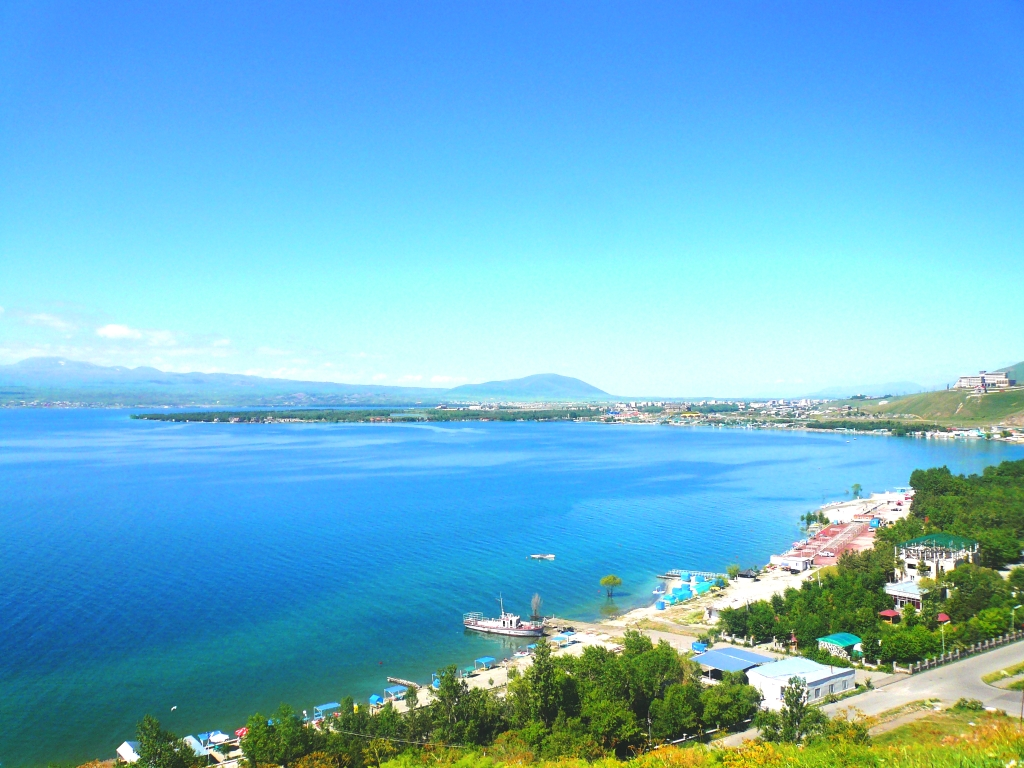
Lake Sevan

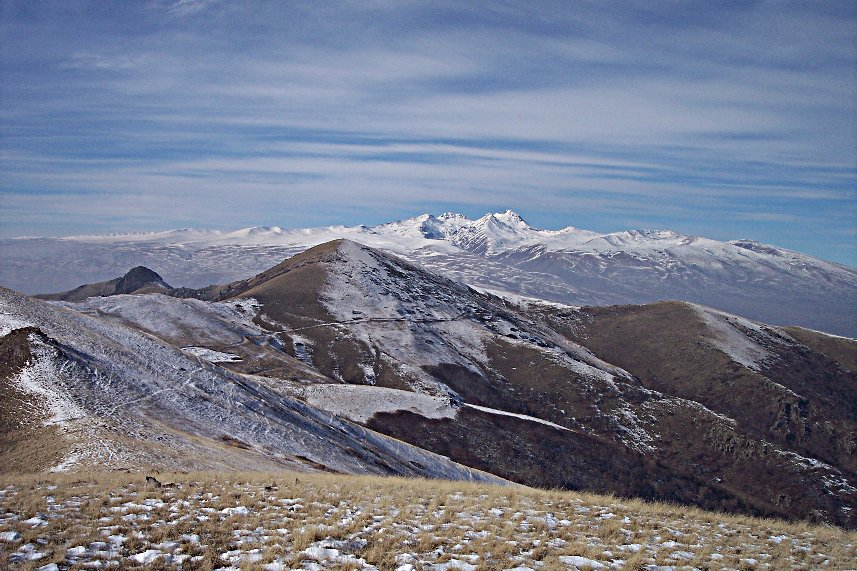
A view of Mount Aragats.

- Islands of Armenia
- Lakes of Armenia
- Mountains of Armenia
  - Volcanoes in Armenia
- Rivers of Armenia
- World Heritage Sites in Armenia

=== Regions of Armenia ===
Regions of Armenia

==== Ecoregions of Armenia ====
List of ecoregions in Armenia

- Caucasus mixed forests

==== Administrative divisions of Armenia ====
- Provinces of Armenia
- Municipalities of Armenia

outline of Armenia

===== Provinces of Armenia =====
Armenia is divided into ten provinces (Armenian: marzer, sing. marz) and a special administrative division for the capital, Yerevan:

- Yerevan
- Shirak
- Armavir
- Lori
- Ararat
- Kotayk
- Gegharkunik
- Syunik
- Aragatsotn
- Tavush
- Vayots Dzor

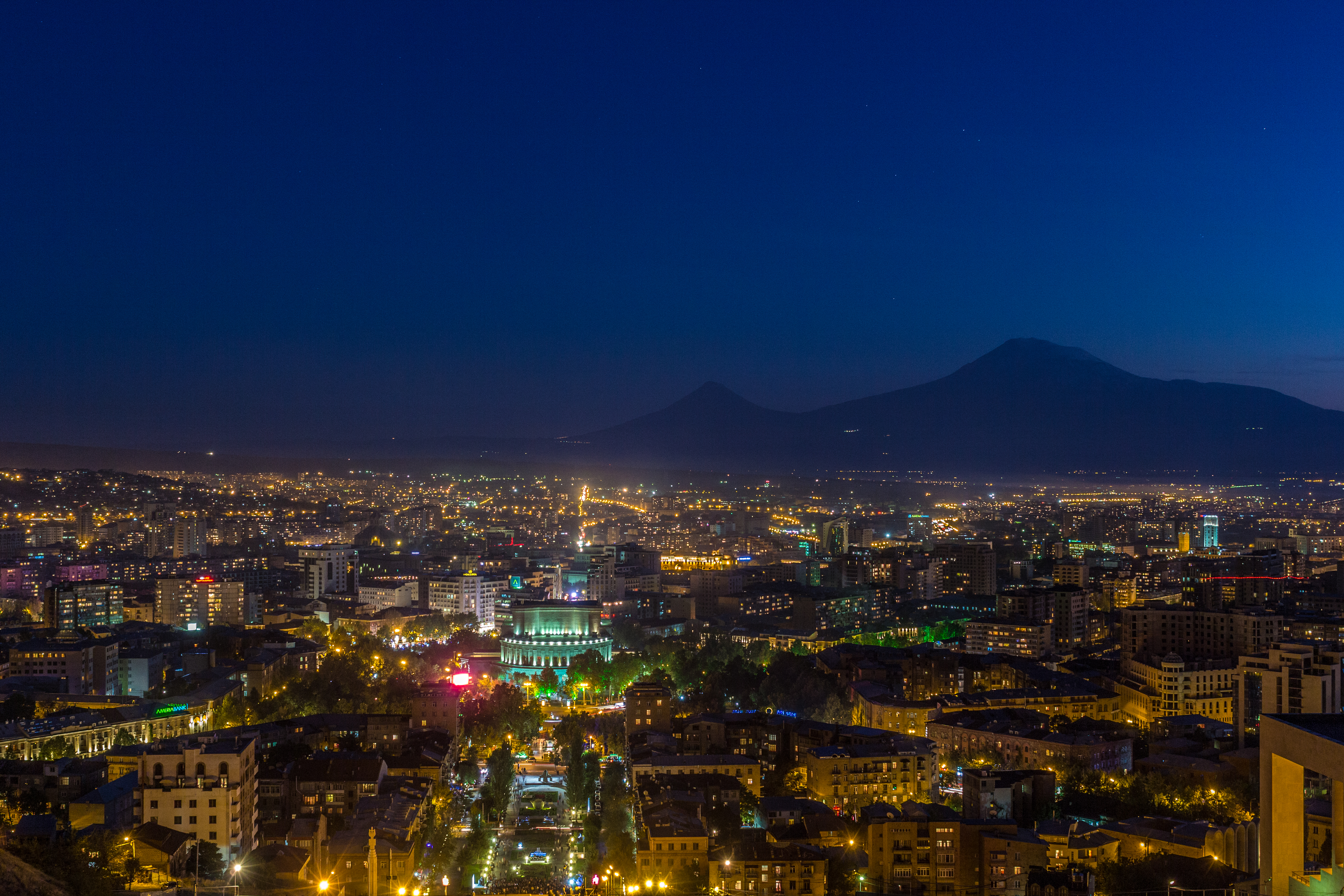
Nighttime view of Yerevan in September 2013

- Capital of Armenia: Yerevan

=== Demography of Armenia ===
Demographics of Armenia

- Census in Armenia
- Ethnic minorities in Armenia
  - Assyrians in Armenia
  - Greeks in Armenia
  - Jews in Armenia
  - Kurds in Armenia
  - Russians in Armenia
  - Ukrainians in Armenia
  - Yazidis in Armenia
- Health in Armenia
- People of Armenia

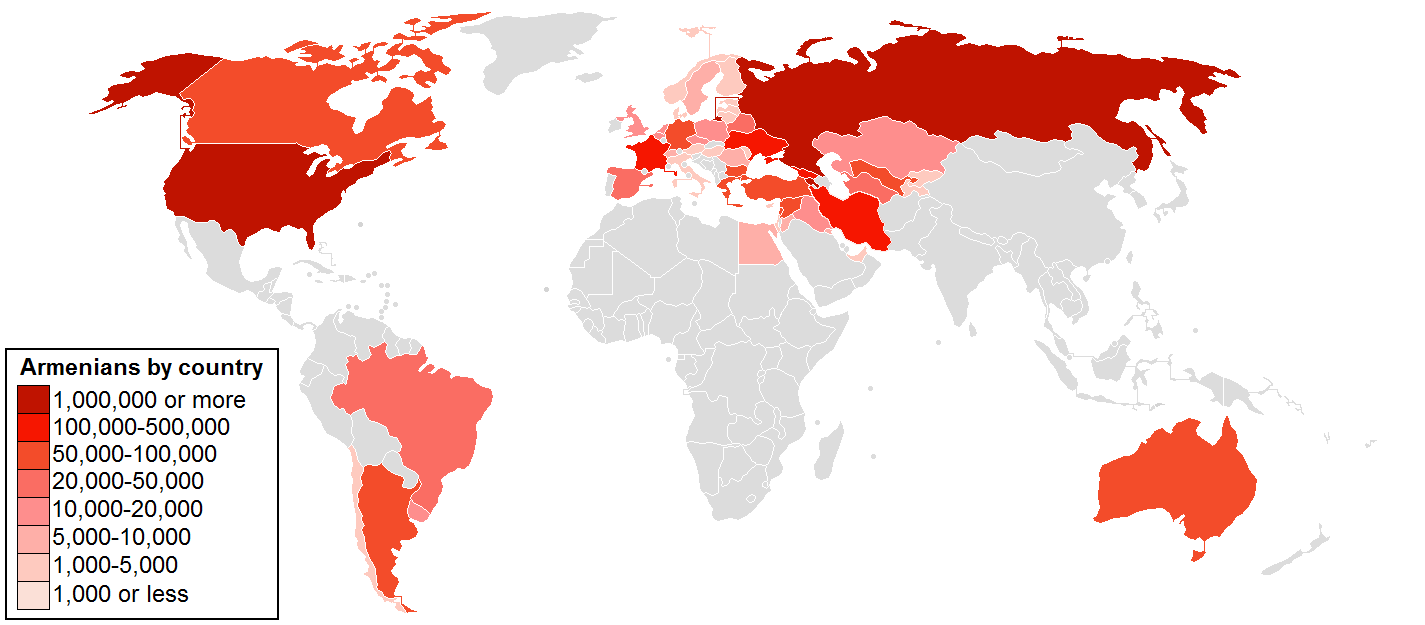
Armenian population by country.

==== Armenian Diaspora ====
Armenian diaspora

- Armenian population by country
  - Largest Armenian diaspora communities

== Government and politics of Armenia ==
- Form of government: unitary semi-presidential representative democratic republic
- Constitution of Armenia
- Elections in Armenia
  - Central Electoral Commission of Armenia

Latest national elections: 2021 Armenian parliamentary election

Upcoming national elections: Next Armenian parliamentary election

- Political parties in Armenia
  - Programs of political parties in Armenia

=== Branches of government ===
Government of Armenia

==== Executive branch of the government of Armenia ====
- Head of state: President of Armenia, Vahagn Khachaturyan
- Head of government: Prime Minister of Armenia, Nikol Pashinyan
- Cabinet of Armenia

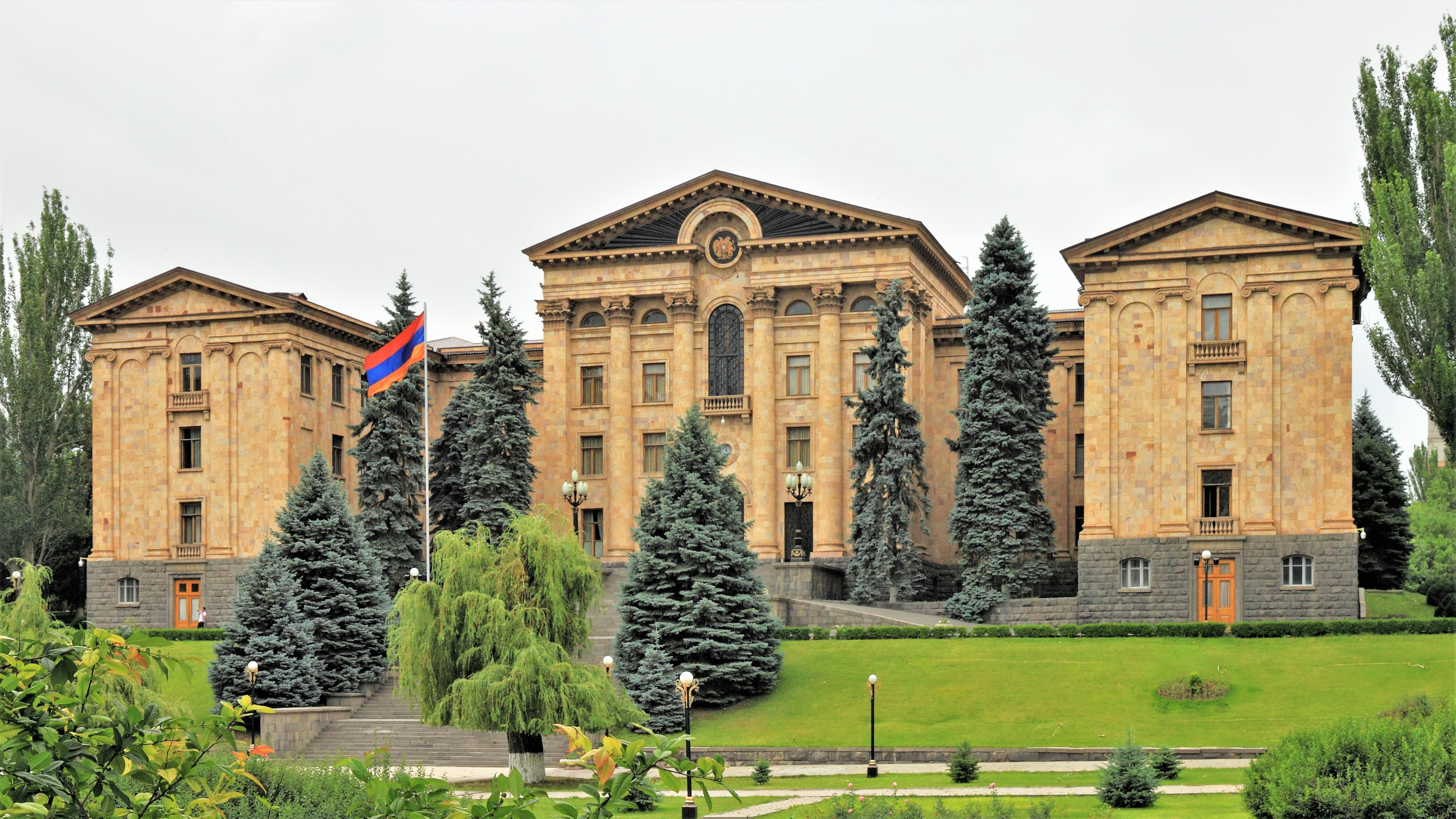
The National Assembly of Armenia on Baghramyan Avenue

==== Legislative branch of the government of Armenia ====
- National Assembly of Armenia

==== Judicial branch of the government of Armenia ====
- Judiciary of Armenia

=== Constitution of Armenia ===
Constitution of Armenia

- Constitutional Court of Armenia
- Court of Cassation of Armenia

=== Foreign relations of Armenia ===
Foreign relations of Armenia: Diplomatic relations established No diplomatic relations established Diplomatic relations suspended by Armenia

As of 2025, Armenia has established diplomatic relations with 183 separate entities.

Ministry of Foreign Affairs: Minister of Foreign Affairs, Ararat Mirzoyan

- Diplomatic missions in Armenia
- Diplomatic missions of Armenia
- List of ambassadors of Armenia
- List of ministers of foreign affairs

Other:

- Armenia and the United Nations
- Armenia–BSEC relations
- Armenia–CSTO relations
- Armenia–European Union relations
  - Armenia-EU Comprehensive and Enhanced Partnership Agreement
- Armenia in the Council of Europe
- Armenia–NATO relations
- Armenia–OSCE relations
- Visa policy of Armenia
- Visa requirements for Armenian citizens
  - Armenian passport

==== International organization membership ====
Armenia is a member of the following international organizations and treaties:

- Arab League (observer)
- Asian Development Bank (ADB)
- Assembly of European Regions
- Berne Convention on the Conservation of European Wildlife and Natural Habitats
- Black Sea Trade and Development Bank
- Bologna Process
- British Council
- Collective Security Treaty Organization (CSTO)
- Commonwealth of Independent States (CIS)
- Council of Europe (CoE)
- Eastern Partnership
- Energy Charter Treaty
- Energy Community (observer)
- Eurasian Customs Union
- Eurasian Development Bank
- Eurasian Economic Union (EAEU)
- Eurocontrol
- Euro-Atlantic Partnership Council (EAPC)
- Euronest Parliamentary Assembly
- European Athletic Association
- European Atomic Energy Community (Cooperation agreement)
- European Aviation Safety Agency (Pan-European Partner)
- European Bank for Reconstruction and Development (EBRD)
- European Broadcasting Union
- European Civil Aviation Conference
- European Charter for Regional or Minority Languages
- European Committee for Standardization (Affiliate member)
- European Common Aviation Area (Negotiating candidate)
- European Convention for the Prevention of Torture
- European Court of Human Rights and the European Convention on Human Rights
- European Cultural Convention
- European Higher Education Area
- European Neighbourhood Policy
- European Olympic Committees
- European Organization for Nuclear Research (Cooperation agreement)
- Federation of Euro-Asian Stock Exchanges
- FIFA and UEFA
- Food and Agriculture Organization (FAO)
- General Confederation of Trade Unions (GCTU)
- International Atomic Energy Agency (IAEA)
- International Bank for Reconstruction and Development (IBRD)
- International Civil Aviation Organization (ICAO)
- International Criminal Court (ICCt) (signatory)
- International Criminal Police Organization (Interpol)
- International Development Association (IDA)
- International Federation of Red Cross and Red Crescent Societies (IFRCS)
- International Finance Corporation (IFC)
- International Fund for Agricultural Development (IFAD)
- International Labour Organization (ILO)
- International Monetary Fund (IMF)
- International Olympic Committee (IOC)
- International Organization for Migration (IOM)
- International Organization for Standardization (ISO)
- International Red Cross and Red Crescent Movement (ICRM)
- International Telecommunication Union (ITU)
- International Telecommunications Satellite Organization (ITSO)
- Interparliamentary Assembly on Orthodoxy
- Inter-Parliamentary Union (IPU)
- Multilateral Investment Guarantee Agency (MIGA)
- Nonaligned Movement (NAM) (observer)
- Organisation internationale de la Francophonie (OIF)
- Organization for Security and Cooperation in Europe (OSCE)
- Organisation for the Prohibition of Chemical Weapons (OPCW)
- Organization of American States (OAS) (observer)
- Organization of the Black Sea Economic Cooperation (BSEC)
- Pacific Alliance (observer)
- Parliamentary Assembly of the Council of Europe
- Partnership for Peace (PFP)
- Shanghai Cooperation Organisation (dialogue partner)
- Swiss Agency for Development and Cooperation
- TRACECA
- United Nations (UN)
- United Nations Committee on the Peaceful Uses of Outer Space
- United Nations Conference on Trade and Development (UNCTAD)
- United Nations Economic Commission for Europe
- United Nations Educational, Scientific, and Cultural Organization (UNESCO)
- United Nations Industrial Development Organization (UNIDO)
- Universal Postal Union (UPU)
- World Bank
- World Customs Organization (WCO)
- World Federation of Trade Unions (WFTU)
- World Health Organization (WHO)
- World Intellectual Property Organization (WIPO)
- World Meteorological Organization (WMO)
- World Tourism Organization (UNWTO)
- World Trade Organization (WTO)

=== Law and order in Armenia ===
Law of Armenia

- Capital punishment in Armenia
- Crime in Armenia
  - Armenian mafia
  - Corruption in Armenia
- Law enforcement in Armenia
  - Prosecutor General of Armenia

Social issues in Armenia

- Human rights in Armenia
  - LGBT rights in Armenia
    - Recognition of same-sex unions in Armenia
  - Freedom of religion in Armenia
- Pensions in Armenia
- Social protection in Armenia
- Tobacco Policy in Armenia
  - Cannabis in Armenia

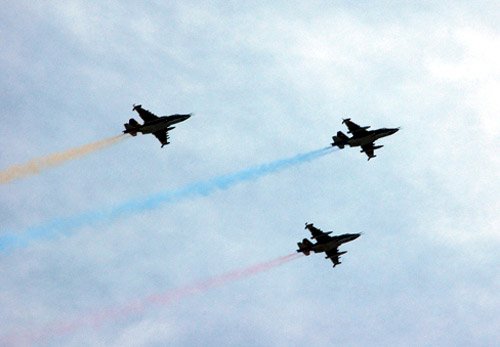
Armenian Air Force Su-25's during a military parade in Yerevan.

=== Military of Armenia ===
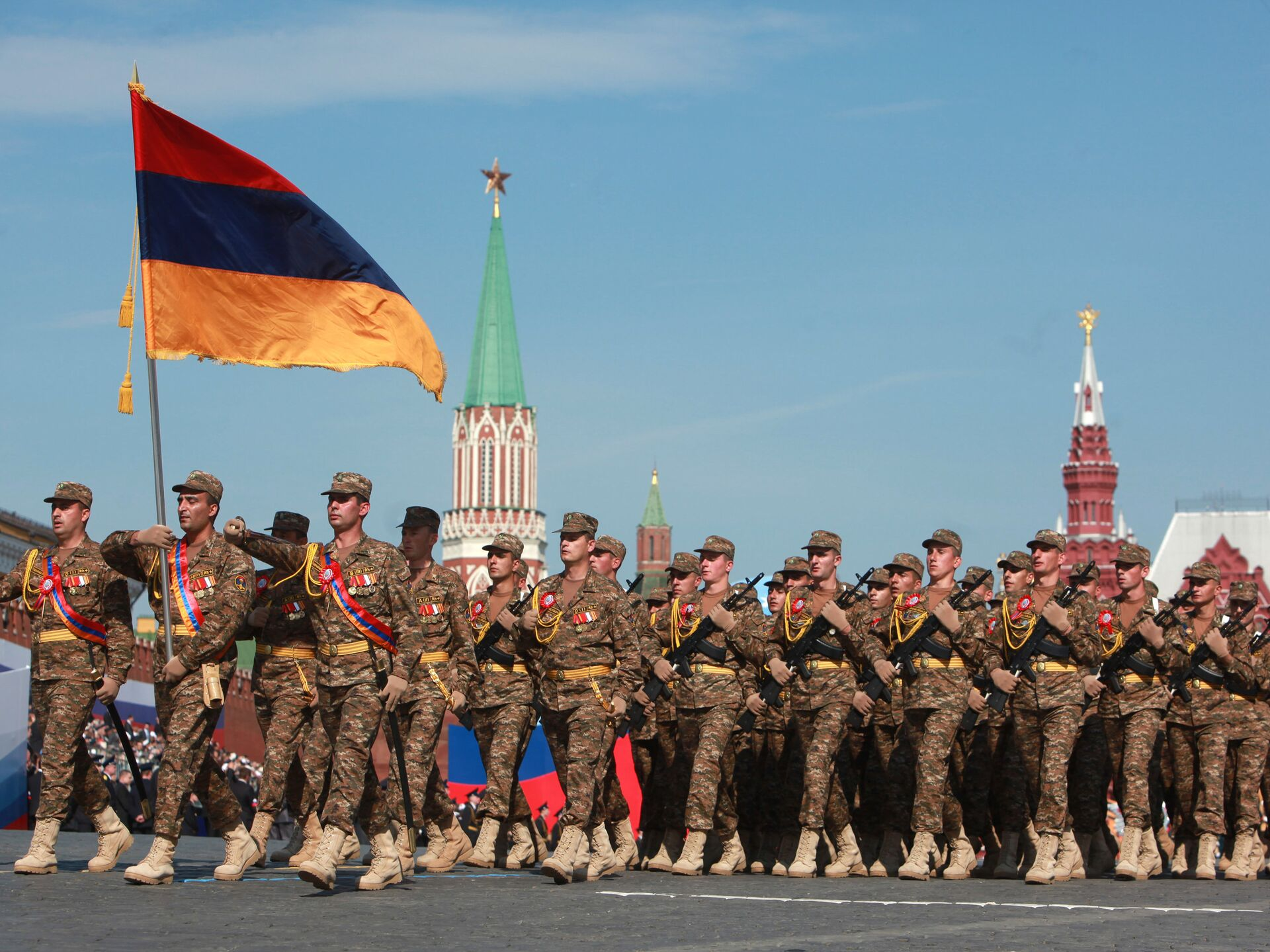
Armenian soldiers at the 2010 Moscow Victory Day Parade

Military of Armenia

- Command
  - Commander-in-chief: Prime Minister of Armenia
    - Ministry of Defence of Armenia
- Forces
  - Air Force of Armenia
  - Army of Armenia
    - List of equipment of the Armenian Armed Forces
  - Navy of Armenia: None
- Military history of Armenia
  - List of wars involving Armenia
- Military ranks of Armenia
- National Security Service of Armenia

=== Local government in Armenia ===
Local government in Armenia

== History of Armenia ==
The short-lived Roman province of Armenia in 117, north of Mesopotamia.

Countries that officially recognize the events as genocide. Countries where certain political parties, provinces or municipalities have recognized the events as genocide, independently from the government as a whole.

- Prehistoric Armenia
- Urartu
- Orontid dynasty
- Artaxiad dynasty
- Roman Armenia
- Arsacid dynasty of Armenia
- Persian Armenia
- Medieval Armenia
- Arminiya
- Armenian Kingdom of Cilicia
- Russian Armenia
- Ottoman Armenia
  - Armenian genocide
    - Armenian genocide recognition
- First Republic of Armenia
- Armenian SSR
- Armenia

== Culture of Armenia ==
- Architecture of Armenia
- Cuisine of Armenia
  - Beer in Armenia

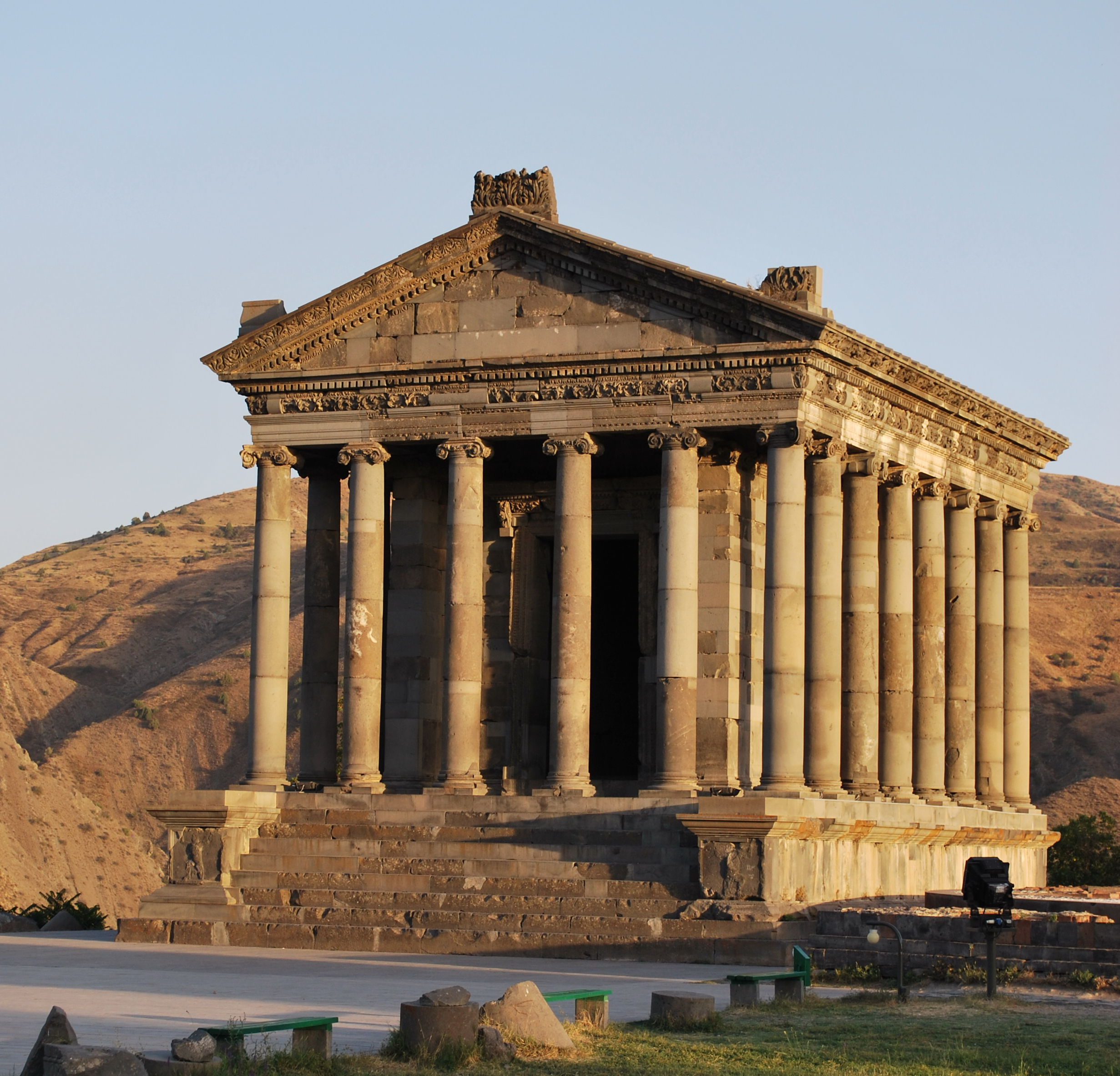
The pagan Garni Temple, probably built in the first century, is the only "Greco-Roman colonnaded building" in the post-Soviet states.

- Languages of Armenia
  - Armenian Sign Language
- List of museums in Armenia
- Media in Armenia
  - Armenian newspapers
  - Media freedom in Armenia
  - Public Radio of Armenia
  - Telecommunications in Armenia
  - Television in Armenia
- National symbols of Armenia
  - Armenian Cross
    - Khachkar
  - Armenian eternity sign
  - Coat of arms of Armenia
  - Flag of Armenia
  - National anthem of Armenia
- Public holidays in Armenia
- World Heritage Sites in Armenia

=== Art in Armenia ===
- Armenian art
  - Cafesjian Museum of Art
  - National Gallery of Armenia
- Armenian dance
- Armenian illuminated manuscripts
- Cinema of Armenia
  - Armenian National Cinematheque
- Literature of Armenia
- Music of Armenia
  - Armenia in the Eurovision Song Contest
  - Armenian jazz
  - Armenian opera
    - Yerevan Opera Theatre
  - Armenian Philharmonic Orchestra
  - Armenian rock
- Theatre of Armenia

=== Religion in Armenia ===
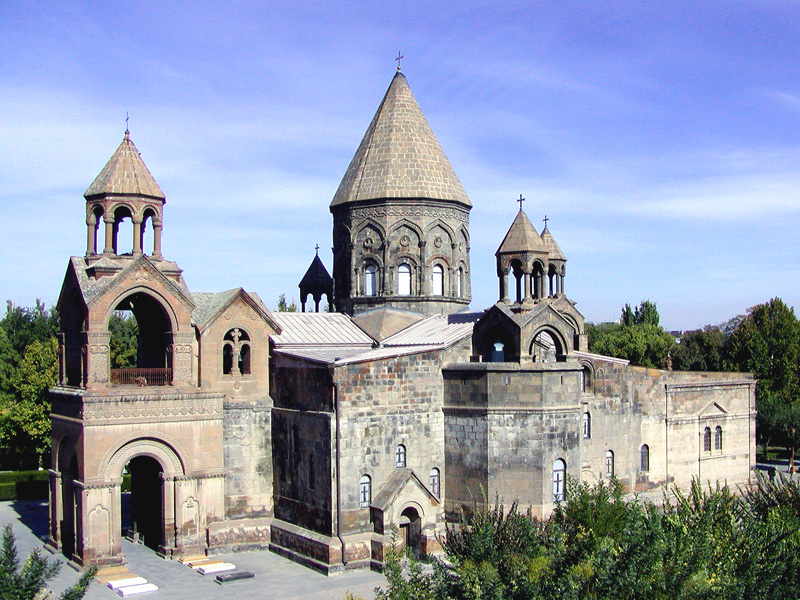
The Etchmiadzin Cathedral, Armenia's Mother Church

Religion in Armenia

- Baháʼí Faith in Armenia
- Christianity in Armenia
  - Armenian Apostolic Church
  - Armenian Catholic Church
  - Armenian Evangelical Church
    - Armenian Brotherhood Church
- Hinduism in Armenia
- Islam in Armenia
- Judaism in Armenia
- Neopaganism in Armenia
- Zoroastrianism in Armenia

=== Sports in Armenia ===
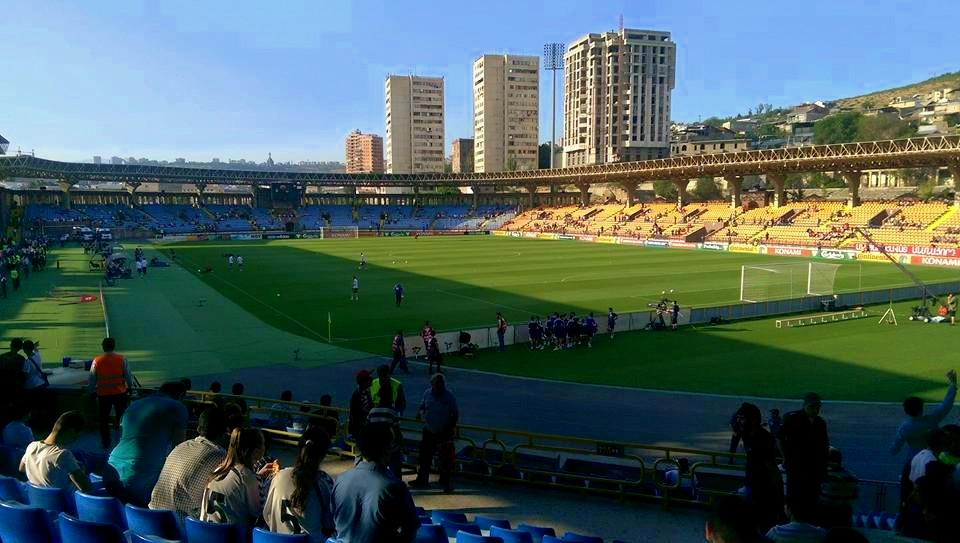
Vazgen Sargsyan Republican Stadium

- Armenia at the Olympics
  - Armenian Olympic Committee
  - List of Armenian Olympic medalists
- Armenian Athletic Federation
- Armenian Automobile Federation
- Armenia at the Paralympics
  - Armenian Paralympic Committee
  - Armenian National Disabled Sports Federation
- Armenian Basketball Federation
  - Armenia national basketball team
- Armenian Baseball Federation
  - Armenia national baseball team
- Armenian Biathlon Federation
- Armenian National Federation of Bodybuilding
- Armenian Boxing Federation
- Armenian Dance Sport Federation
- Armenian Darts Federation
- Armenian Diving Federation
- Armenian Fencing Federation
- Armenian Gymnastics Federation
- Armenian Handball Federation
- Armenian Mountaineering and Hiking Federation
- Armenian national ice hockey team
- Armenian National Rowing and Canoe Federation
- Armenian National Squash Federation
- Armenian Powerlifting Federation
- Armenian Sailing Federation
- Armenian Shooting Federation
- Armenian Ski Federation
- Armenian Snooker And Pocket Billiards Federation
- Armenian Student Sports Federation
- Armenian Swimming Federation
  - Armenian Synchronized Swimming Federation
  - List of Armenian records in swimming
- Armenian Table Soccer Federation
- Armenian Table Tennis Federation
- Armenian Taekwondo Federation
- Armenian Triathlon Federation
- Armwrestling Federation of Armenia
- Badminton Federation of Armenia
- Boxing in Armenia
- Checkers Federation of Armenia
- Chess Federation of Armenia
- Equestrian Federation of Armenia
- Figure Skating Federation of Armenia
- Football in Armenia
  - Armenia national football team
    - Armenia national under-21 football team
  - Armenian Premier League
  - Football Federation of Armenia
- Golf Federation of Armenia
- Grappling Federation of Armenia
- Judo Federation of Armenia
- Karate Federation of Armenia
  - Armenian Kyokushin Karate Federation
  - Armenian Shotokan Karate Federation
- Mas-Wrestling Federation of Armenia
- National Archery Federation of Armenia
- National Federation of Modern Pentathlon of Armenia
- National Kendo Federation of Armenia
- Pan-Armenian Games
- Rugby Federation of Armenia
  - Armenia national rugby union team
- Sambo Federation of Armenia
- Skateboarding Federation of Armenia
- Tennis Federation of Armenia
- Traditional Wushu Federation of Armenia
- Volleyball Federation of Armenia
- Water Polo Federation of Armenia
- Weightlifting in Armenia
  - Armenian Weightlifting Federation
- Wrestling in Armenia
  - Wrestling Federation of Armenia

== Economy and infrastructure of Armenia ==
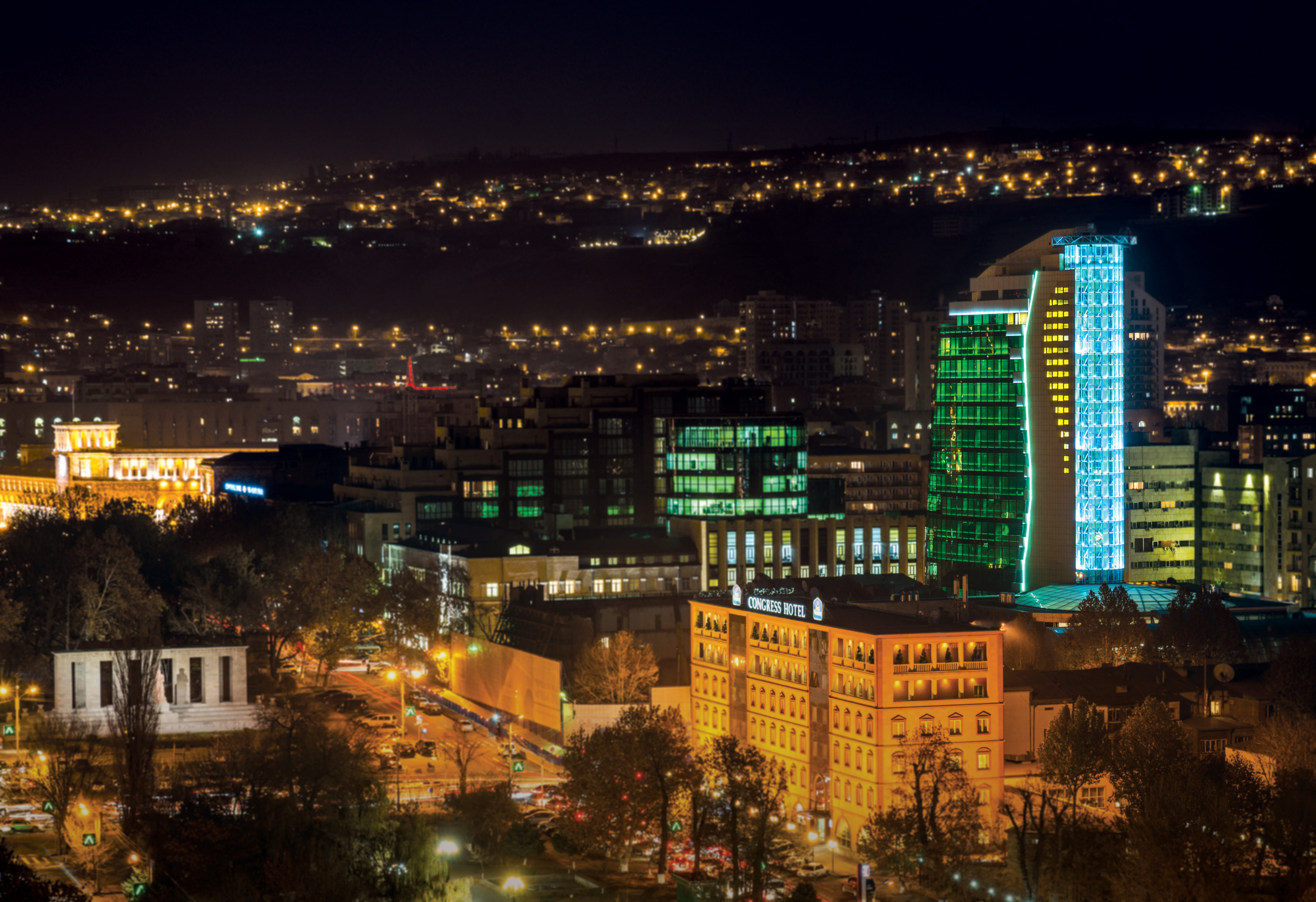
The redeveloped Yerevan downtown is the commercial and business centre of the city

Economy of Armenia

- Economic rank, by nominal GDP (2007): 121st (one hundred and twenty first)
- Agriculture in Armenia
- Banking in Armenia
  - Armenia Securities Exchange
  - Central Bank of Armenia
  - Central Depository of Armenia
  - List of banks in Armenia
- Communications in Armenia
  - Internet in Armenia
- Companies of Armenia
  - ArmCosmos
  - HayPost
- Currency of Armenia: Dram
  - ISO 4217: AMD
- Energy in Armenia
  - Armenian Nuclear Power Plant
  - Electricity sector in Armenia
  - Ministry of Energy Infrastructures and Natural Resources (Armenia)
  - Renewable energy in Armenia
  - Solar power in Armenia
- Geographical issues in Armenia
- Mining in Armenia
- Taxation in Armenia
  - Armenian Customs Service
  - Armenian Tax Service
- Tourism in Armenia
  - List of World Heritage Sites in Armenia
  - Paragliding in Armenia
  - Visa policy of Armenia

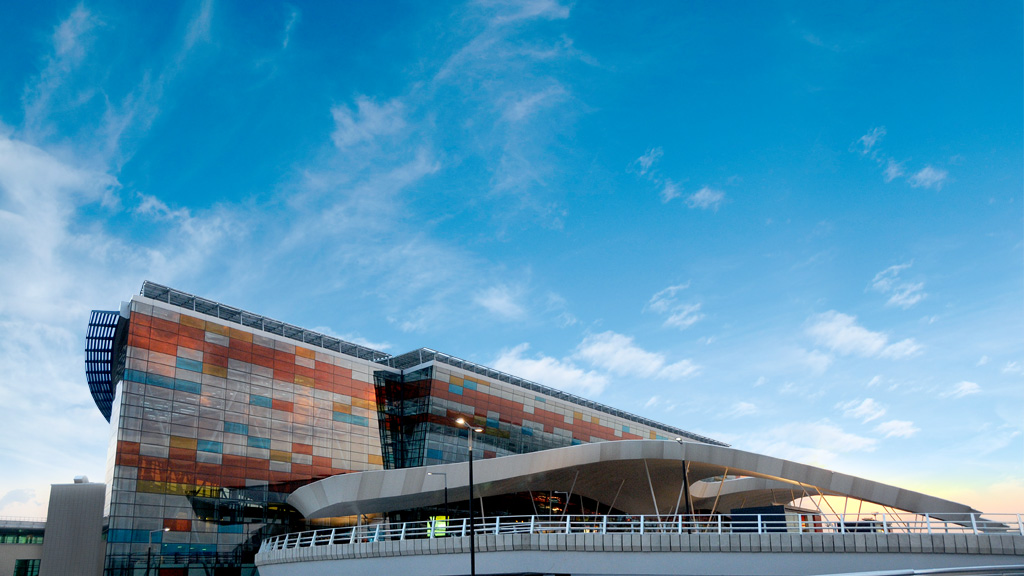
The main entrance to Zvartnots Airport

- Transport in Armenia
  - Airports in Armenia
    - List of airlines of Armenia
    - List of the busiest airports in Armenia
  - Rail transport in Armenia
    - Armenian Railways
    - Railway stations in Armenia
    - South Caucasus Railway
    - Yerevan Metro
  - Roads in Armenia

== Education in Armenia ==
- List of universities in Armenia:
  - American University of Armenia
  - Eurasia International University
  - European University of Armenia
  - Russian-Armenian University
  - Université Française en Arménie
  - Yerevan State University
- Specialized universities:
  - Armenian National Agrarian University
  - Armenian State University of Economics
  - Komitas Conservatory
  - Gevorgian Theological Seminary
  - National Polytechnic University of Armenia
  - National University of Architecture and Construction of Armenia
  - State Academy of Fine Arts of Armenia
  - Yerevan State Medical University
- Schools:
  - Ayb school
  - Children of Armenia Fund
  - Tumo
  - UWC Dilijan
- Armenian-language schools outside Armenia

== See also ==
Armenia

- List of Armenia-related topics
- List of international rankings
- Member states of the Council of Europe
- Member states of the Eurasian Economic Union
- Member state of the United Nations
- Outline of Europe
- Outline of geography
- Outline of the Republic of Artsakh
