= Armenian Olympic Committee =

National Olympic Committee

- Country: Armenia
- [[|]]
- Code: ARM
- Created: 1990
- Recognized: 1993
- Continental Association: EOC
- Headquarters: Yerevan, Armenia
- President: Gagik Tsarukyan
- Secretary General: Hrachya Rostomyan
- Website: www.armnoc.am

The Armenian Olympic Committee (ARMNOC; Armenian: Հայաստանի ազգային օլիմպիական կոմիտե, romanized: Hayastani Olimpiakan Komite; IOC Code: ARM) is the National Olympic Committee responsible for Armenia's participation in the Olympic Games. It is headquartered in Yerevan.

== History ==
The Armenian Olympic Committee was founded in 1990. The committee became a member of the International Olympic Committee in 1993 and subsequently became a member of the European Olympic Committees, among other international sports organizations.

== List of presidents ==
President	Term
Ruben Hakobyan	1990–1993
Ruben Torosyan	1993–1994
Aleksan Avetisyan	1994-1999
Benur Pashyan	1999–2000
Ishkhan Zakaryan	2000–2005
Gagik Tsarukyan	2005–present

== Executive committee ==
The committee of the ARMNOC is represented by:

- President: Gagik Tsarukyan
- Vice Presidents: Vahram Arakelyan, Hoksen Mirzoyan, Derenik Gabrielyan
- Secretary General: Hrachya Rostomyan
- Members: Ishkhan Zakaryan, Harutyun Kushkyan, Samvel Khachatryan, Vardevan Grigoryan, Hripsime Jilavyan, Levon Julfalakyan, Israel Militosyan, Hakob Panosyan, Albert Azaryan

== Member federations ==
The Armenian National Federations are the organizations that coordinate all aspects of their individual sports. They are responsible for training, competition and development of their sports. There are currently 20 Olympic Summer and three Winter Sport Federations and four Non-Olympic Sports Federations in Armenia.

=== Olympic sport federations ===
National Federation	Summer or Winter	Headquarters
Armenian Archery Federation	Summer	Yerevan
Armenian Athletic Federation	Summer	Yerevan
Armenian Badminton Federation	Summer	Yerevan
Armenian Baseball Federation	Summer	Yerevan
Basketball Federation of Armenia	Summer	Yerevan
Armenian Biathlon Federation	Winter	Gyumri
Armenian Boxing Federation	Summer	Yerevan
Armenian Canoeing Federation	Summer	Yerevan
Armenian Cycling Federation	Summer	Yerevan
Armenian Dance Sport Federation	Summer	Yerevan
Armenian Diving Federation	Summer	Yerevan
Armenian Equestrian Federation	Summer	Yerevan
Armenian Fencing Federation	Summer	Yerevan
Armenian Figure Skating Federation	Winter	Yerevan
Football Federation of Armenia	Summer	Yerevan
Armenian Gymnastics Federation	Summer	Yerevan
Armenian Handball Federation	Summer	Yerevan
Armenian Judo Federation	Summer	Yerevan
Armenian Karate Federation	Summer	Yerevan
Armenian Korfball Federation	Summer	Yerevan
Armenian Modern Pentathlon Federation	Summer	Yerevan
Armenian Mountaineering and Hiking Federation	Winter	Yerevan
Rugby Federation of Armenia	Summer	Yerevan
Armenian Sailing Federation	Summer	Yerevan
Armenian Shooting Federation	Summer	Yerevan
Armenian Ski Federation	Winter	Yerevan
Armenian Squash Federation	Summer	Yerevan
Armenian Swimming Federation	Summer	Yerevan
Armenian Synchronized Swimming Federation	Summer	Yerevan
Armenian Table Tennis Federation	Summer	Yerevan
Armenian Taekwondo Federation	Summer	Yerevan
Armenian Tennis Federation	Summer	Yerevan
Armenian Triathlon Federation	Summer	Yerevan
Armenian Volleyball Federation	Summer	Yerevan
Armenian Water Polo Federation	Summer	Yerevan
Armenian Weightlifting Federation	Summer	Yerevan
Armenian Wrestling Federation	Summer	Yerevan
Armenian Wushu Federation	Summer	Yerevan

=== Non-Olympic sport federations ===
National Federation	Headquarters
Armenian Armwrestling Federation	Yerevan
Armenian Automobile Federation	Yerevan
Armenian Bodybuilding Federation	Yerevan
Armenian Chess Federation	Yerevan
Armenian Darts Federation	Yerevan
Armenian Draughts Federation	Yerevan
Armenian Esports Federation	Yerevan
Armenian Floorball Federation	Vanadzor
Armenian Grappling Federation	Yerevan
Armenian Kendo Federation	Yerevan
Armenian Kyokushin Karate Federation	Yerevan
Armenian Mas-Wrestling Federation	Yerevan
Armenian Powerlifting Federation	Yerevan
Armenian Practical Shooting Federation	Yerevan
Armenian Sambo Federation	Yerevan
Armenian Shotokan Karate Federation	Yerevan
Armenian Skateboarding Federation	Yerevan
Armenian Snooker And Pocket Billiards Federation	Yerevan
Armenian Table Soccer Federation	Yerevan
Armenian Teqball Federation	Yerevan

== Olympavan training complex ==
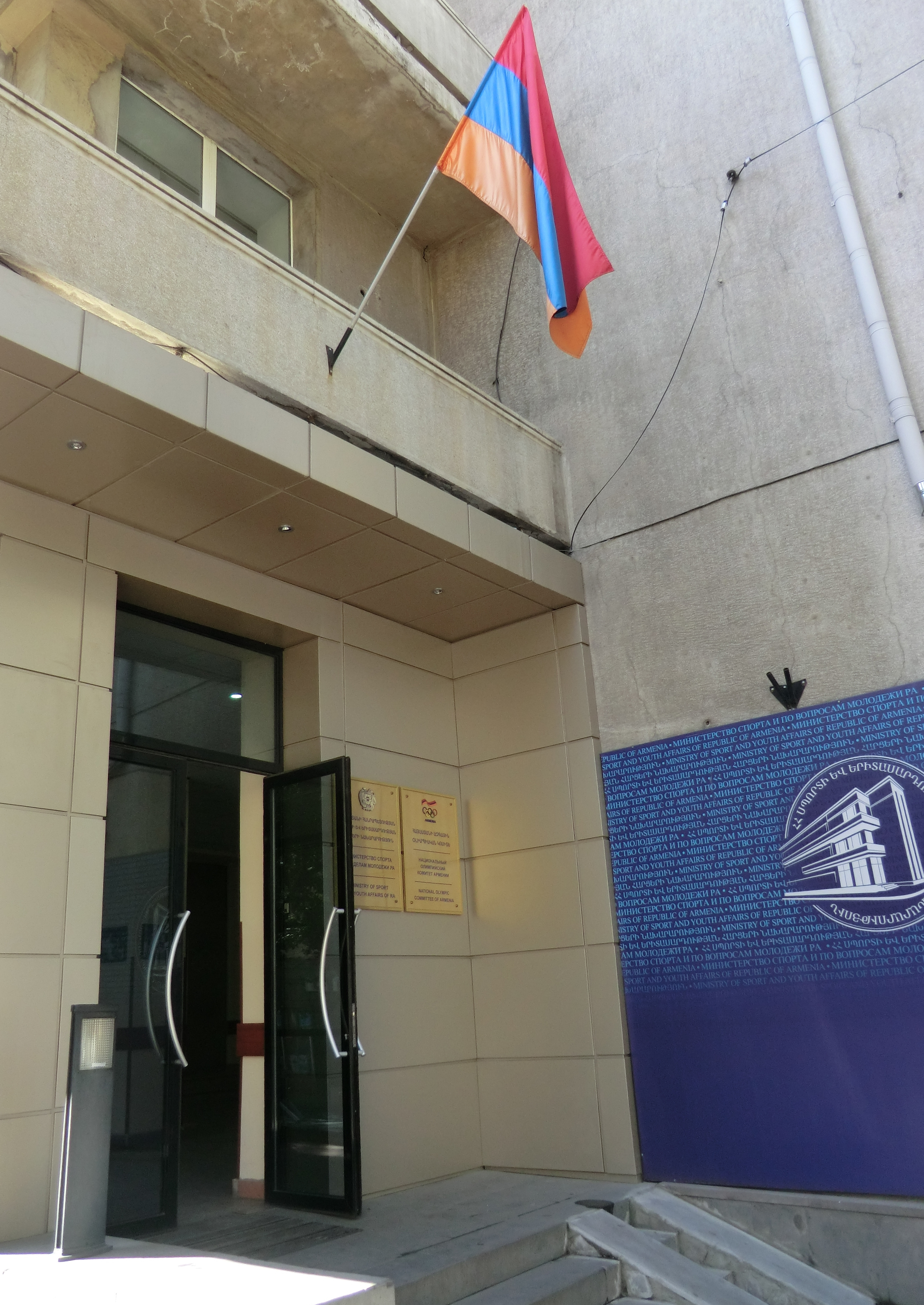
Former offices of the Armenian Olympic Committee in Yerevan

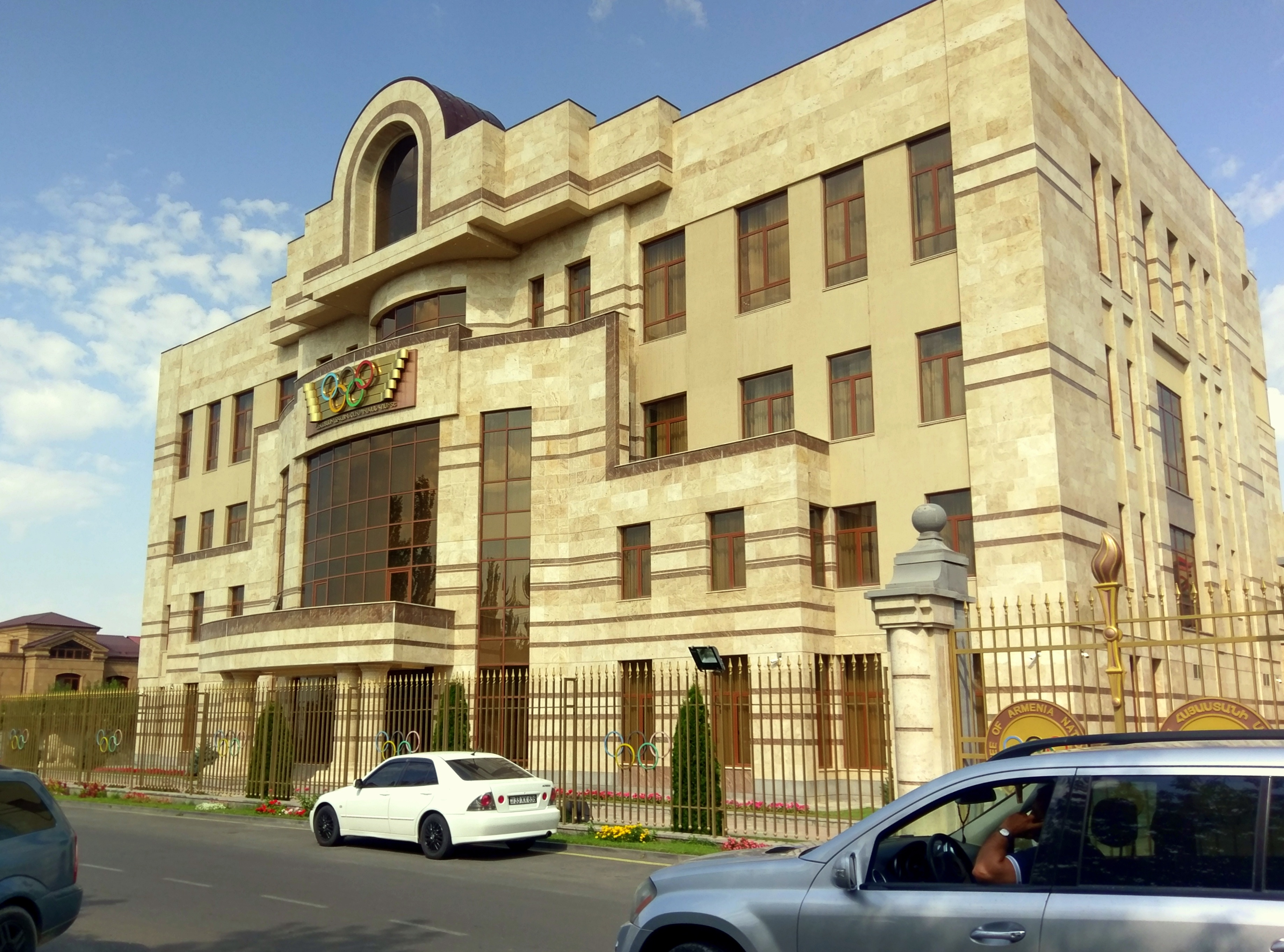
Olympavan, the headquarters of the Armenian Olympic Committee, Yerevan

Olympavan is the official training centre of the Armenian Olympic Committee, located in the Davtashen District of the capital Yerevan. Following a 2-year period of construction process between 2013 and 2015, the Olympavan was officially opened on 29 September 2015, on the occasion of the 25th anniversary of the Armenian Olympic Committee. The ceremony was attended by then-Prime Minister Hovik Abrahamyan, businessman Samvel Karapetyan, Sheikh Ahmed Al-Fahad Al-Sabah, Gagik Tsarukyan, as well as delegates of 25 different national Olympic committees.

The complex occupies an area of 10,000 m^{2} and consists of 5 buildings. Building 1 is the administrative centre of the Armenian Olympic Committee, home to the administrative offices, meeting rooms and conference halls.

The first floor of building 2 is home to the weightlifting training hall, the anti-doping clinic, the centre's spa, and the fitness and bodybuilding gymnasium. The 2nd floor is home to the judo, boxing and wrestling training halls.

Building 3 is home to the hotel of the complex designated to accommodate more than 300 athletes with 121 guestrooms, restaurants and other services.

Building 4 is home to an indoor arena with 250 seats, used for basketball, volleyball, handball and futsal.

Building 5 is home to the indoor swimming pool with its diving facilities. It was officially opened on 27 September 2017 by Sheikh Ahmed Al-Fahad Al-Sabah and Gagik Tsarukyan.

The president of the International Olympic Committee Mr. Thomas Bach visited the centre during the final phases of the construction process in 2014.

== See also ==
- Armenia at the Olympics
- Armenian Paralympic Committee
- Armenian Student Sports Federation
- European Olympic Committees
- Sport in Armenia
