= Armenian Women's Volleyball League =

- Current season, competition or edition: 2022–23
- Sport: Volleyball
- Founded: 1992
- First season: 1992
- No. of teams: 10 Teams
- Country: Armenia
- Continent: Europe
- Domestic cups: Armenian Cup; Armenian Super Cup
- International cups: CEV Champions League; CEV Cup; CEV Challenge Cup
- Website: http://www.armvolley.am/

The Armenian Women's Volleyball Championship is an annual competition of women 's volleyball teams of Armenia. It has been held since 1992 under the "spring-autumn" system. Teams from the unrecognized Nagorno-Karabakh Republic have also participated in a number of the tournament Editions. Since 2013 the championship is held under the name of the Women's National League and it is controlled by the Armenian Volleyball Federation.

== Competition formula ==
The Rule of The 2019 Championship consisted of two stages - preliminary and final. In the preliminary stage the teams had a two-round tournament. The top two teams played the championship in the final match, the 3rd and 4th plays for the bronze medals. Five teams played in the 2019 championship: KHMMMM (Yerevan), "Van" (Yerevan ), "Artsakh" (Stepanakert (Khankendi), unrecognized NKR), YPLH (Yerevan), "Avan" (Yerevan). The champion title was won for the 4th time in a row by the KHMOMM team, who defeated "Van" in the final 3:1. The 3rd place was taken by "Artsakh".

== Past champions ==
Years	Champions	Runners-up	Third place
1992	Oasis Echmiadzin		
1993	Oasis Echmiadzin		
1994	Oasis Echmiadzin		
1995	Oasis Echmiadzin		
1996	FIMA Yerevan		
1997	FIMA Yerevan		
1998	NJDEH Erevan		
1999	NJDEH Erevan		
2000	Artik		
2001	NJDEH Erevan		
2002	Sisian		
2003	Sisian		
2004	NJDEH Erevan		
2005	Sisian		
2006	NJDEH Erevan	Artik	Sisian
2007	NJDEH Erevan		
2008	NJDEH Erevan		
2009	NJDEH Erevan		
2010	Sisian	NJDEH Erevan	Artsakh Stepanakert
2011	Sisian	NJDEH Erevan	Artsakh Stepanakert
2012	Sisian		
2013	Sisian		
2014	NJDEH Erevan		
2015	NJDEH Erevan		
2016	Khommand Erevan		
2017	Khommand Erevan		
2018	Khommand Erevan		
2019	Khommand Erevan	VAN Yerevan	Artsakh
