= Armenian National Federation of Bodybuilding =

Sporting Organization

National Federation of Bodybuilding logo

The Armenian National Federation of Bodybuilding (Armenian: Բոդիբիլդինգի Հայաստանի ազգային ֆեդերացիա), also known as the National Bodybuilding and Fitness Federation of Armenia, is the regulating body of bodybuilding in Armenia, governed by the Armenian Olympic Committee. The headquarters of the federation is located in Yerevan.

== History ==
The Armenian National Federation of Bodybuilding was established in 1997 and the current president is Gevorg Hakobyan. The Federation is a full member of the International Federation of BodyBuilding and Fitness. Armenian bodybuilding athletes participate in various European and international level bodybuilding competitions. In May 2015, the Federation organized a joint training seminar with the Russian Bodybuilding Federation. In May 2016, the Federation sent athletes to participate in the Black Sea Cup, winning several medals. In May 2017, the Federation hosted the "Armenian Championship in Bodybuilding, Beach Bodybuilding and Fitness Bikini" in Yerevan, where national and international participants competed in fitness and figure competition.

The Federation also organizes the annual 'Armenian Bodybuilding Championships', where bodybuilders from Armenia and neighboring countries compete.

== See also ==
- List of IFBB member federations
- List of professional bodybuilding competitions
- Professional bodybuilding
- Sport in Armenia
