= Teqball Federation of Armenia =

Sports organization

Teqball Federation of Armenia logo

The Teqball Federation of Armenia (Armenian: Հայաստանի Teqball ֆեդերացիա), also known as the National Teqball Federation of Armenia, is the regulating body of teqball in Armenia, governed by the Armenian Olympic Committee. The headquarters of the federation are located in Yerevan.

== History ==
The Teqball Federation of Armenia was established in 2020 and is currently led by President Yuri Sargsyan. The Federation oversees the training of teqball specialists, also known as teqers, and is responsible for the development of teqball in the country. The Federation organizes Armenia's participation in European and international teqball competitions. The Federation also organizes national teqball tournaments, including the weekly "Teqball Series" competitions hosted from the Teqball Centre in Yerevan. The Federation is a full member of the International Teqball Federation.

== See also ==
- Sport in Armenia
