= Armenian Triathlon Federation =

Sports organization of Armenia

Armenian Triathlon Federation logo

The Armenian Triathlon Federation (Armenian: Հայաստանի եռամարտի ֆեդերացիա), is the regulating body of triathlon in Armenia, governed by the Armenian Olympic Committee. The headquarters of the federation is located in Yerevan.

== History ==
The Armenian Triathlon Federation is currently led by president Hrachya Avetisyan. The Federation oversees the training of triathlon specialists and organizes Armenia's participation in European and international level triathlon competitions. The Federation is a full member of World Triathlon and Europe Triathlon. On 17 March 2018, the Federation signed a cooperation agreement with the Russian Triathlon Federation during a conference held in Moscow.

== See also ==
- Armenian Biathlon Federation
- Sport in Armenia
