= Golf Federation of Armenia =

Sporting Organization

Golf Federation of Armenia logo

The Golf Federation of Armenia (Armenian: Հայաստանի գոլֆի ֆեդերացիա), also known as the National Golf Association of Armenia, is the regulating body of golf in Armenia, governed by the Armenian Olympic Committee. The headquarters of the federation is located in Yerevan.

== History ==
The Federation was established in December 2006 and the current president of the Golf Federation of Armenia is Karen Hovhannisyan. The Federation is a full member of the International Golf Federation and the European Golf Association.

== Caucasus Cup ==
The Caucasus Cup was launched in 2015 by a joint initiative between the golf federations of Armenia and Georgia. The Caucasus Cup format was designed to be similar to the Ryder Cup. The inaugural competition took place in Kachreti, Georgia at the Ambassadori Golf Club, and the 2016 event took place at the Ararat Golf Club in Yerevan, Armenia. The aim of this initiative is to make golf a more popular activity in the Caucasus region.

== See also ==
- Sport in Armenia
