= Armenian Floorball Federation =

Sports organization of Armenia

Armenian Floorball Federation logo

The Armenian Floorball Federation (AFF) (Armenian: Հայաստանի ֆլորբոլի ֆեդերացիա), is the regulating body of floorball in Armenia, governed by the Armenian Olympic Committee. The headquarters of the federation is located in Vanadzor.

== History ==
The Armenian Floorball Federation was established in 1999 and is currently led by President Sergey Sargsyan. The Federation oversees the training of floorball specialists and referees and is responsible for the development of floorball in the country. The Federation organizes Armenia's participation in European and international floorball competitions. The Federation is a member of the International Floorball Federation.

== Activities ==
In 2001, the Federation launched the annual Armenian Floorball Championships.

== See also ==
- Sport in Armenia
