= Armenian Sailing Federation =

Armenian sailing national body

Armenian Sailing Federation ASF
- IOC nation: Armenia (ARM)
- Sport: Sailing

HISTORY
- Year of formation: 2004

DEMOGRAPHICS
- Number of Sailing clubs: Approx. 5

AFFILIATIONS
- International federation: International Sailing Federation (ISAF)
- ISAF member since: 2004
- Continental association: EUROSAF
- National Olympic Committee: Armenian Olympic Committee

ELECTED
- President: Bagrat Soghomonyan

SECRETARIAT
- Address: Sevan 150; Yerevan
- Country: Armenia
- Secretary General: Ashot Khachatryan
- Olympic team manager: Smbat Hakobyan

FINANCE
- Company status: Federation

The Armenian Sailing Federation (Armenian: Հայաստանի առագաստանավային սպորտի ֆեդերացիա, romanized: Hayastani arragastanavayin federats’ia) is the national governing body for the sport of sailing in Armenia, recognized by the International Sailing Federation. The headquarters of the Federation is located in Yerevan.

== See also ==
- Sport in Armenia
