= Armenian Taekwondo Federation =

Sporting Organization

Armenian Taekwondo Federation logo

The Armenian Taekwondo Federation (Armenian: Հայաստանի թաեքվոնդոյի ֆեդերացիա), is the regulating body of taekwondo in Armenia, governed by the Armenian Olympic Committee. The headquarters of the federation is located in Yerevan.

== History ==
The Federation is currently led by president Karen Grigoryan. The Federation became a member of World Taekwondo in 1996, and subsequently became a full member of the European Taekwondo Union and the International Taekwon-Do Federation.

The Federation organizes national and international competitions, while Armenian taekwondo athletes have won medals in both world and European championships. There are seven taekwondo clubs in Armenia, several of which train athletes to compete in Olympic competitions.

== See also ==
- Sport in Armenia
