= Armenian Table Soccer Federation =

Sports organization of Armenia

Armenian Table Soccer Federation logo

The Armenian Table Soccer Federation (Armenian: Հայաստանի սեղանի ֆուտբոլի ֆեդերացիա), also known as the Armenian Table Football Federation, is the regulating body of table soccer in Armenia, governed by the Armenian Olympic Committee. The headquarters of the federation is located in Yerevan.

== History ==
The Armenian Table Soccer Federation is currently led by president Gor Avetisyan. The Federation was established on 16 July 2019 and organizes Armenia's participation in European and international table soccer competitions. The Federation also organizes national table soccer tournaments and championships, such as the Armenian Open Cup. The Federation is a full member of the International Table Soccer Federation, within the "European Division".

== See also ==
- Football Federation of Armenia
- Sport in Armenia
