= Sambo Federation of Armenia =

Sports governing body in Armenia

Sambo Federation of Armenia logo

The Sambo Federation of Armenia (Armenian: Հայաստանի սամբոյի ֆեդերացիա), is the regulating body of sambo in Armenia, governed by the Armenian Olympic Committee. The headquarters of the federation is located in Yerevan.

== History ==
The Federation is currently led by president Mikael Hayrapetyan. The Federation oversees the training of sambo specialists and organizes competitions in Armenia and Artsakh, including youth tournaments. Armenian sambo athletes participate in various European and international level sambo competitions, including the World Sambo Championships and the European Sambo Championships. The Federation is a full member of the International Federation of Amateur Sambo and the European Sambo Federation.

== Activities ==
Armenian sambo athletes won 38 medals at the 2012 World and European Championships.

In October 2016, athletes participated in the World Sambo Championship and the World Youth Championships in Romania.

In April 2017, the Federation sent athletes to participate in the European Junior, Girls and Youth Sambo Championships, held in Prague.

During the April 2019 European Junior and Youth Sambo Championships, Armenian sambo athletes won 16 medals.

During the 2020 Nagorno-Karabakh war, the Federation organized supplies to be sent to Artsakh.

In May 2021, the Federation sent 35 athletes to participate in the European Sambo Championship, held in Cyprus. In October 2021, sambo athletes competed at the World Youth Sambo Championship in Greece, winning 5 medals.

In October 2022, it was announced that the Sambo World Youth Championship will be held in Yerevan. Around 600 athletes from 25 countries will participate.

== See also ==
- Sport in Armenia
