= Armenian Esports Federation =

Sports organization of Armenia

- Abbreviation: AEF
- Established: 2018
- Headquarters: Yerevan, Armenia
- President: Smbat Siradeghyan
- Website: aef.org.am/

The Armenian Esports Federation (AEF) (Armenian: Հայաստանի Կիբերսպորտի Ֆեդերացիա, romanized: Hayastani elektronayin sporti federats’ia) is a non-governmental organization responsible for the development and popularization of esports in Armenia. The main aims of AEF are to help Armenian esports players to perform in international platforms, promote esports clubs, spur business industries on performing in Esports, regularly hold national tournaments, and provide youth with occupational opportunities. The headquarters of the federation is located in Yerevan.

== History ==
The Armenian Esports Federation was established in 2018 and is currently led by President Smbat Siradeghyan. The Federation oversees the training of esports specialists and is responsible for the development of esports in the country. The Federation organizes Armenia's participation in European and international esports competitions, including the World Cyber Games. The Federation also organizes national online tournaments and educational seminars. The Federation is a full member of the International Esports Federation, the Global Esports Federation, the World Esports Consortium, and the European Esports Federation.

== See also ==
- Sport in Armenia
