= Armenian Darts Federation =

Sporting Organization

The Armenian Darts Federation (Armenian: Տեգեր Հայաստանի ֆեդերացիա), is the regulating body of dart throwing in Armenia, governed by the Armenian Olympic Committee. The headquarters of the federation is located in Yerevan.

== History ==
The Federation was established in 2000. Karen Giloyan is the founder and current president. The Federation oversees the training of dartists and organizes dart throwing tournaments throughout the country. The first dart throwing competition was held in Yerevan in October 2009.

== See also ==
- Sport in Armenia
