= Judo Federation of Armenia =

Sporting Organization

- Judo Federation of Armenia logo
- Sport: Judo
- Founded: 1992
- Affiliation: IJF
- Regional affiliation: EJU
- (Armenia)

The Judo Federation of Armenia (Armenian: Հայաստանի ձյուդոյի ֆեդերացիա), is the regulating body of judo in Armenia, governed by the Armenian Olympic Committee. The headquarters of the federation is located in Yerevan.

== History ==
The Federation was established in 1992 and the current president is Vardan Voskanyan. The Federation is a full member of the International Judo Federation and the European Judo Union. Armenian judo athletes participate in various European, international and Olympic level judo competitions, including the World Judo Championships. The Federation maintains cooperation with the Georgian and Russian Judo Federations, including joint training activities.

== See also ==
- List of judo organizations
- Sport in Armenia
