= Armenian National Squash Federation =

Sporting organization

Armenian National Squash Federation logo

The Armenian National Squash Federation (Armenian: Հայաստանի սքվոշի ազգային ֆեդերացիա) is the regulating body of squash in Armenia, governed by the Armenian Olympic Committee. The headquarters of the federation is located in Yerevan.

== History ==
The Armenian National Squash Federation was established in July 2007 and the current president is Mikayel Vardanyan. The Federation is a full member of the World Squash Federation and the European Squash Federation. The Federation organizes Armenia's participation in various international and European level squash tournaments and is responsible for the training of squash specialists. The "Grand Sport" sports complex was built in 2011 and Armenia's first squash courts were created within the complex. National and international squash tournaments are hosted in the complex.

In June 2018, the Director of the World Squash Federation, Andrew Schelli, as well as several other delegates from Belgium, France, Slovenia, and Egypt arrived in Yerevan to discuss developing the sport of squash in Armenia with representatives from the Armenian National Squash Federation.

== See also ==
- Sport in Armenia
