= Badminton Federation of Armenia =

Sporting Organization

Badminton Federation of Armenia logo

The Badminton Federation of Armenia (Armenian: Հայաստանի բադմինտոնի ֆեդերացիա), is the regulating body of badminton in Armenia, governed by the Armenian Olympic Committee. The headquarters of the federation is located in Yerevan.

== History ==
The Federation was established in 1992 and is currently led by president Ashot Aghababyan. The Federation oversees the training of badminton specialists and organizes badminton tournaments throughout the country. The Armenia national badminton team participates in various European, international, and Olympic level badminton competitions, including the European Badminton Championships and the BWF World Championships. The Federation is a full member of Badminton Europe and the Badminton World Federation.

The Federation often attends the World Badminton Federation's annual congress.

== See also ==
- Sport in Armenia
