= Armenian Ski Federation =

Sporting Organization

- Armenian: Հայաստանի դահուկային սպորտի ֆեդերացիա
- Sport: Ski
- Jurisdiction: Armenia
- Founded: 1992
- Affiliation: International Ski and Snowboard Federation; Small Evolving Ski Nations

The Armenian Ski Federation (Armenian: Հայաստանի դահուկային սպորտի ֆեդերացիա), also known as the Armenian Ski and Snowboard Federation, is the regulating body of skiing and snowboarding in Armenia, governed by the Armenian Olympic Committee. The headquarters of the federation is located in Yerevan.

== History ==
Armenian Ski Federation alternate logo

The Federation was established in 1992 and the current president is Gagik Sargsyan. The Federation is a full member of the International Ski and Snowboard Federation (FIS) and the Small Evolving Ski Nations.

== Activities ==
The Armenian skiing team participates in various international skiing competitions, including the FIS Alpine World Ski Championships.

In 2018, the European Union supported the development of a cross-country skiing festival in Armenia. The aim was to promote winter sports tourism and offer skiing masterclasses by professional trainers.

== See also ==
- Armenian Biathlon Federation
- List of ski areas and resorts in Europe
- Sport in Armenia
- Tsaghkadzor ski resort
