= Tennis Federation of Armenia =

Sporting Organization

Tennis Federation of Armenia logo

The Tennis Federation of Armenia (Armenian: Հայաստանի թենիսի ֆեդերացիա), also known as the Armenian Tennis Federation, is the regulating body of tennis in Armenia, governed by the Armenian Olympic Committee. The headquarters of the federation is located in Yerevan.

== History ==
The Tennis Federation of Armenia was established in 1940. Harutyun Pambukyan is the current president. The Federation oversees the training of tennis specialists and organizes Armenia's participation in European and international level tennis competitions. The Federation is a full member of the International Tennis Federation and Tennis Europe.

== Activities ==
The Federation manages several tennis clubs across Armenia and organizes annual tennis tournaments. The Federation also manages the Armenia Davis Cup team, which itself sends tennis athletes to participate in the Davis Cup. Meanwhile, the Armenia Billie Jean King Cup team, also managed by the Federation, is responsible for sending athletes to compete in the Billie Jean King Cup.

== See also ==
- Sport in Armenia
