= National Archery Federation of Armenia =

Sporting Organization

National Archery Federation of Armenia logo

The National Archery Federation of Armenia (Armenian: Հայաստանի նետաձգության ազգային ֆեդերացիա), also known as the Armenian Archery Federation, is the regulating body of archery in Armenia, governed by the Armenian Olympic Committee. The headquarters of the federation is located in Yerevan.

== History ==
The Federation was established in 1993 and the current president is Nazik Amiryan. The Federation is a full member of World Archery and World Archery Europe. Armenian archers participate in various European, international and Olympic level archery competitions, including the World Archery Championships. The Federation also organizes national tournaments and archery training events.

Between 2010 and 2011, the Federation hosted and organized two consecutive European level archery competitions in Armenia.

== See also ==
- Sport in Armenia
