= Armenian Fencing Federation =

Sporting Organization

Armenian Fencing Federation logo

The Armenian Fencing Federation (Armenian: Հայաստանի սուսերամարտի ֆեդերացիա), also known as the Fencing Federation of Armenia, is the regulating body of fencing in Armenia, governed by the Armenian Olympic Committee. The headquarters of the federation is located in Yerevan.

== History ==
The Federation is currently led by president Armen Grigoryan. The Federation oversees the training of fencing specialists and operates several fencing clubs throughout the country. Armenian fencing athletes participate in various European and international level fencing competitions, including in the European Fencing Championships. The Federation is a full member of the International Fencing Federation and the European Fencing Confederation.

== Activities ==
The 2018 European Fencing Under 23 Championships were held in Yerevan, which marked the first time a high level fencing tournament was held in Armenia. On 9 April 2021, President of the European Fencing Confederation, Stanislav Poznyakov, visited Armenia and met with representatives of the Armenian Fencing Federation to discuss boosting cooperation.
