= Sport in Armenia =

A wide array of sports are played in Armenia. Popular sports in Armenia include football, basketball, volleyball, and ice hockey. Further, the country sends athletes to the Olympics in boxing, wrestling, weightlifting, judo, gymnastics, track and field, diving, swimming, and shooting. Armenia's mountainous terrain provides great opportunities for the practice of sports like skiing and rock climbing. Being a landlocked country, water sports can only be practiced on lakes, notably Lake Sevan. Competitively, Armenia has been very successful at chess, weightlifting, and wrestling at the international level. Armenia is also an active member of the international sports community, with full membership in the Union of European Football Associations (UEFA), Federation of International Bandy (FIB), International School Sport Federation, International Ice Hockey Federation (IIHF), among others. It also hosts the Pan-Armenian Games.

== Olympics as part of the USSR ==
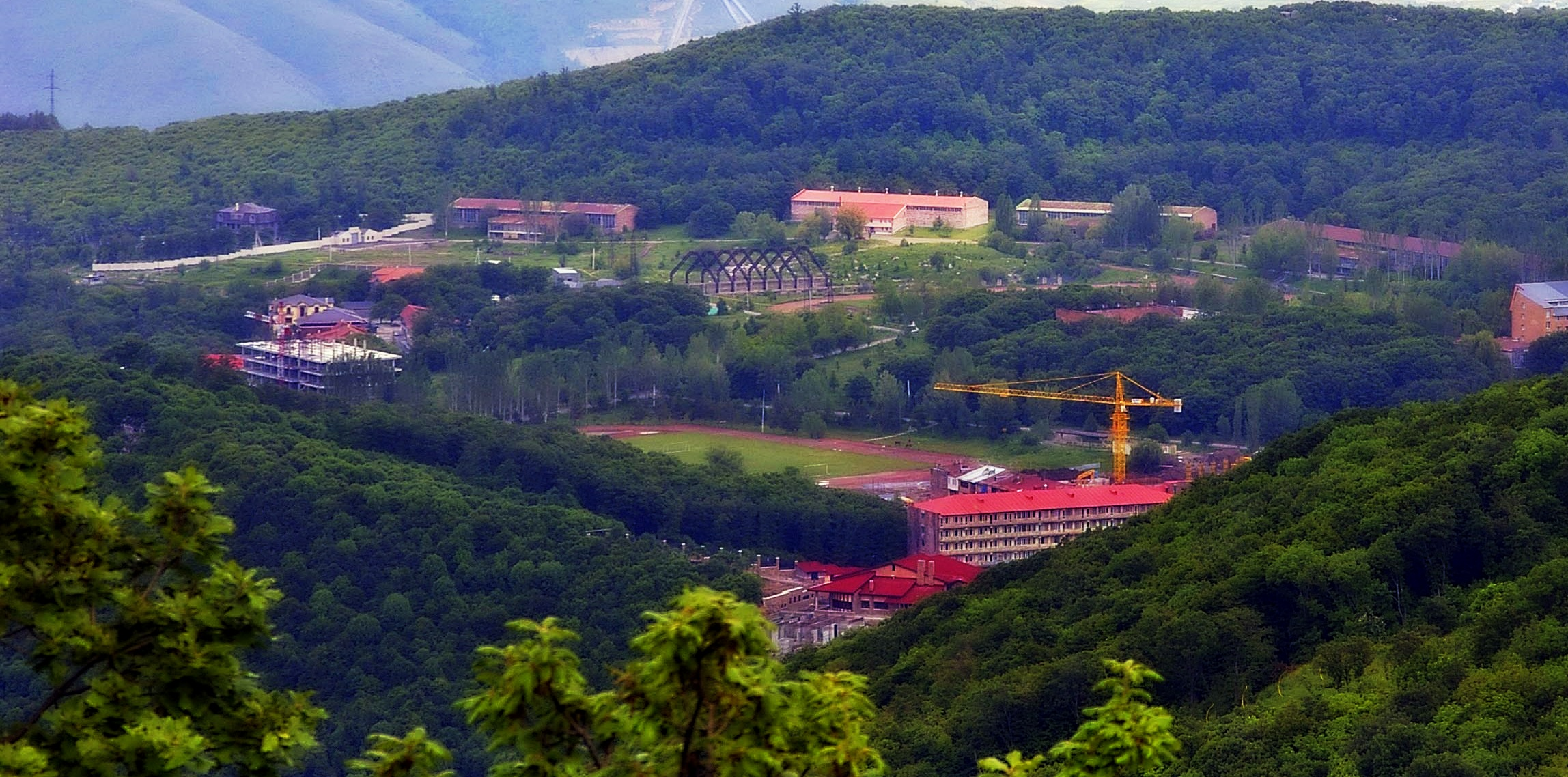
Tsaghkadzor Olympic Sports Complex, opened in 1967 specifically to host the preparation of the Soviet athletes for the 1968 Summer Olympics in Mexico City

Prior to 1992, Armenians would participate in the Olympics representing the USSR, and in 1992 they were part of the Unified Team. As part of the Soviet Union, Armenia was very successful, winning plenty of medals and helping the USSR win the medal standings at the Olympics on numerous occasions. The first medal won by an Armenian in modern Olympic history was by Hrant Shahinyan (sometimes spelled as Grant Shaginyan), who won two golds and two silvers in gymnastics at the 1952 Summer Olympics in Helsinki. To highlight the level of success of Armenians in the Olympics, Shahinyan was quoted as saying:

Armenian sportsmen had to outdo their opponents by several notches for the shot at being accepted into any Soviet team. But those difficulties notwithstanding, 90 percent of Armenian athletes on Soviet Olympic teams came back with medals.

Armenia contributed several more notable gymnasts to the powerful Soviet gymnastics team, including world and Olympic champions Albert Azaryan, Eduard Azaryan and Artur Akopyan.

== Olympics after Independence ==
Armenia first participated at the 1992 Summer Olympics in Barcelona, under a unified CIS team, where it was very successful. Despite only having five athletes, Armenians won 4 medals. Hrachya Petikyan won gold in sharp shooting, Israel Militosyan won gold in weightlifting, and in wrestling Mnatsakan Iskandaryan won gold and Alfred Ter-Mkrtychyan won silver. Since the 1994 Winter Olympics in Lillehammer, Armenia has participated as an independent nation.

Armenia participates in the Summer Olympic Games in boxing, fencing, wrestling, weightlifting, judo, gymnastics, track and field, diving, swimming, and sharp shooting. It also participates in the Winter Olympic Games in alpine skiing, cross-country skiing, and figure skating.

== Popular sports ==
=== Wrestling ===
Wrestling has been a successful sport in the Olympics for Armenia. 8 of the 17 Armenian Olympic medalists and were wrestlers. At the 1996 Summer Olympics in Atlanta, Armen Nazaryan won the gold in the Men's Greco-Roman Flyweight (52 kg) category, and Armen Mkrtchyan won the silver in Men's Freestyle Paperweight (48 kg) category, securing Armenia's first two medals in its modern Olympic history.

With Armenia's two gold medalists, Armen Nazaryan (1996) and Artur Aleksanyan (2016), and six silver medalists, Armen Mkrtchyan (1996), Tigran Martirosyan (2008), Arsen Julfalakyan (2012), Mihran Harutyunyan(2016), and Artur Aleksanyan(2020, 2024), wrestling is Armenia's most successful Olympic sport. Half of Armenia's Olympic medals have come from wrestling.

Armenia hosted the 2010 FILA Wrestling World Cup. The Armenian wrestling team came in third place overall and Armenian wrestlers individually won three of the seven gold medals.

Traditional Armenian wrestling is called kokh, and practiced in traditional garb; it was one of the influences included in the Soviet combat sport of sambo, which is also very popular. Sambo in Armenia is regulated by the Sambo Federation of Armenia.

=== Football ===
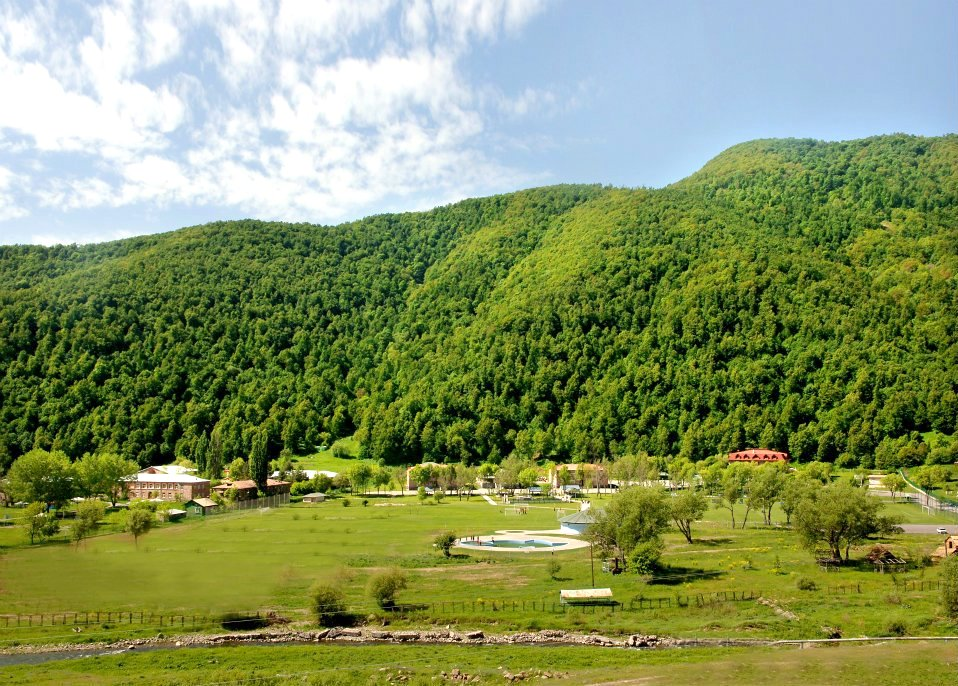
Zepyur Football Training Camp in Kotayk Province

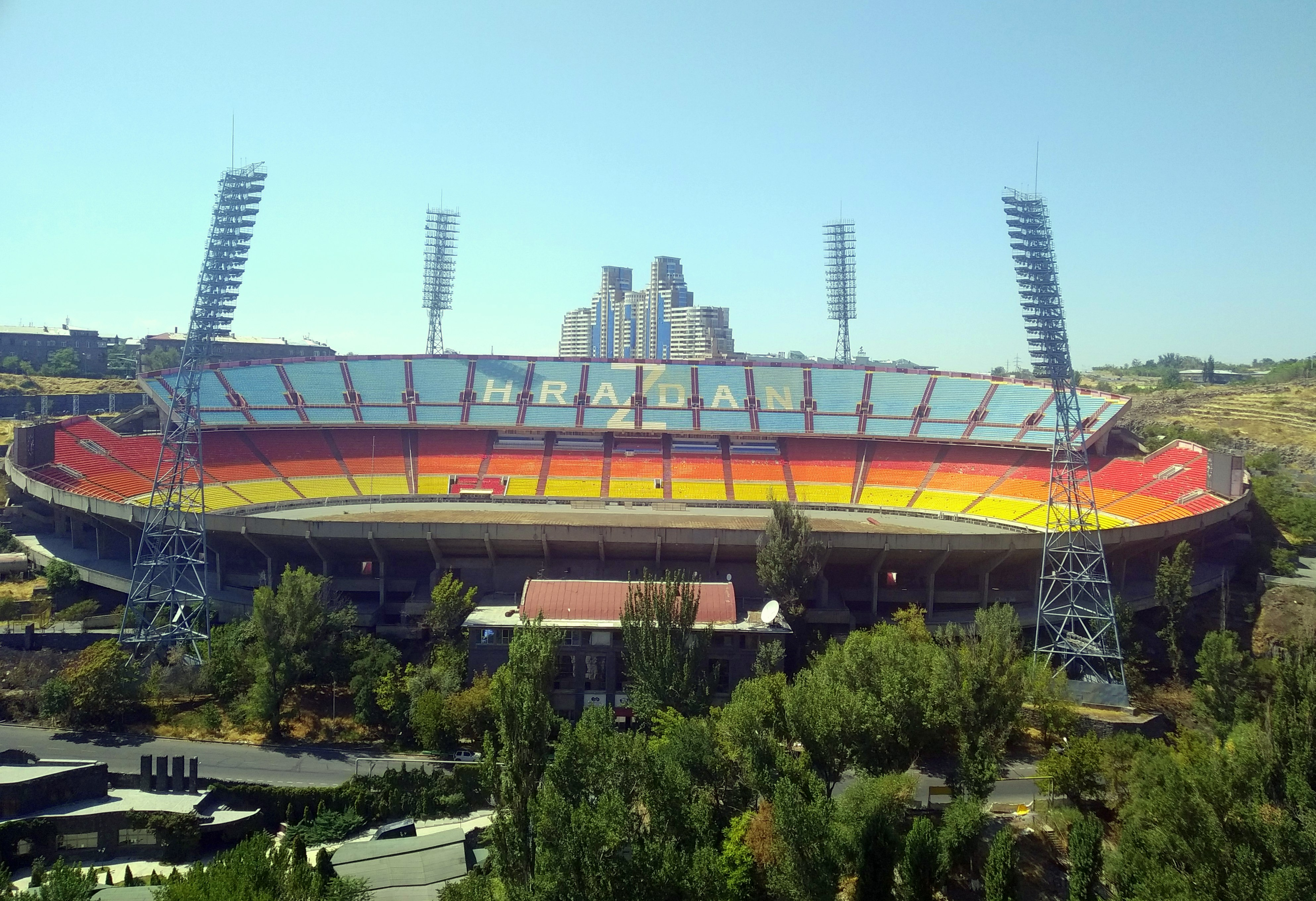
Hrazdan Stadium

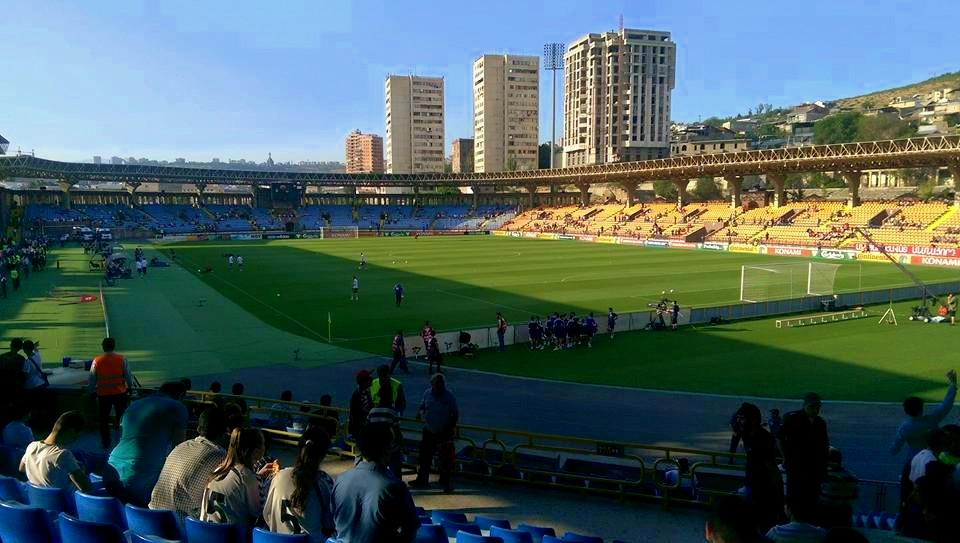
Vazgen Sargsyan Republican Stadium, home of Armenia national football team

Football is the most popular sport in Armenia. Armenia used to play as part of the USSR national football team at the international level. Their most successful team was Yerevan's FC Ararat, which had claimed Soviet championship in the 1973, and had also gone to post home victory against FC Bayern Munich in the 1974–75 European Cup. Armenia played as part of the USSR until 1992, when the Armenia national football team played their first official match, representing solely Armenia, against Moldova. The national team is controlled by the Football Federation of Armenia. The Armenian Premier League is the top flight football competition in Armenia. The league currently consists of ten teams, and relegates to the Armenian First League. Over the years, the league has evolved from a small competition, consisting of only eight teams to two separate divisions. Armenia also has many football venues, such as the Hrazdan Stadium and Vazgen Sargsyan Republican Stadium.

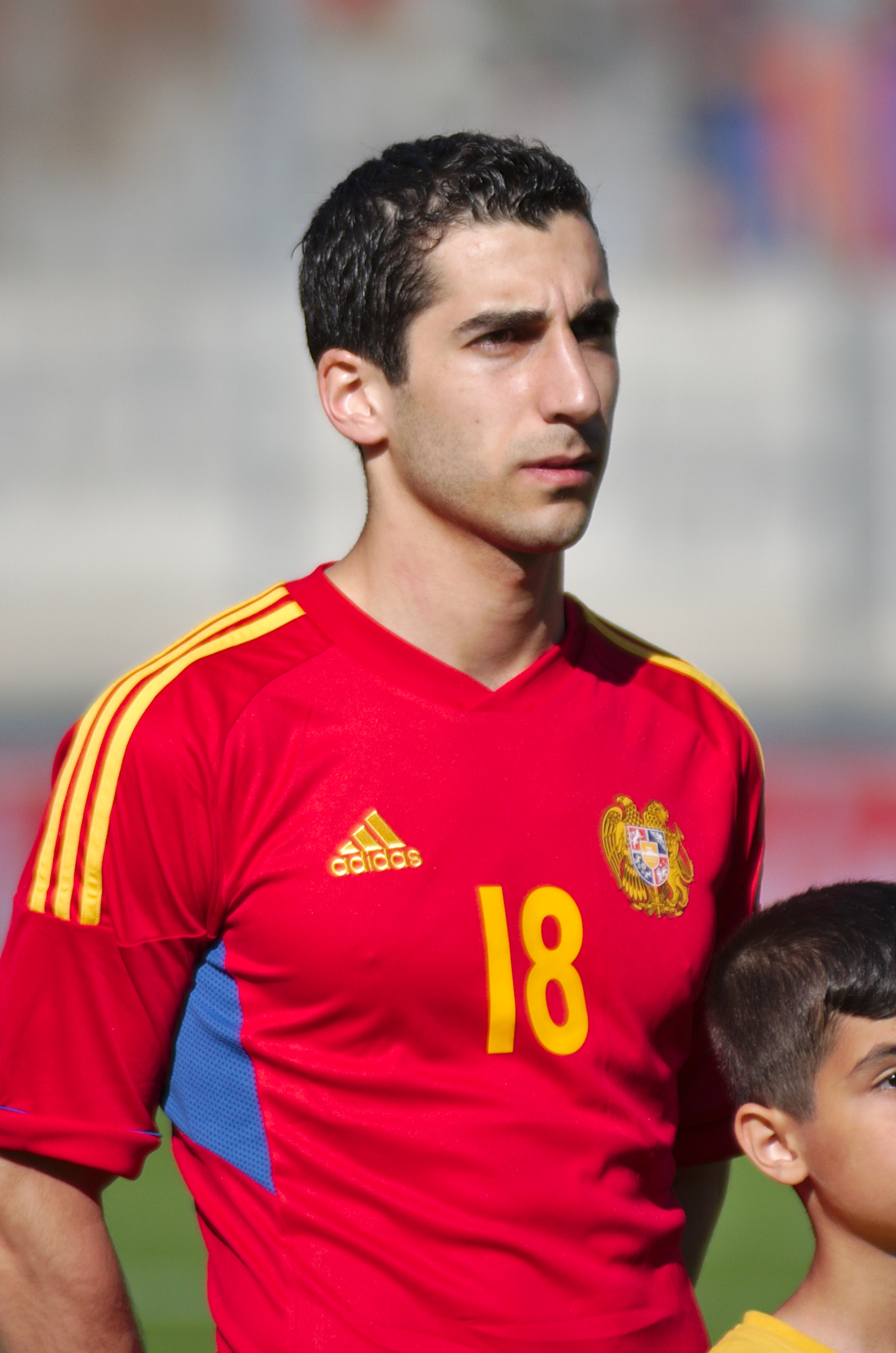
Henrikh Mkhitaryan is currently the most prominent footballer in Armenia, despite his retirement.

Nikita Simonyan was a member of the Olympic gold medal winning Soviet Union national football team at the 1956 Summer Olympics and a four-time Soviet Top League and two-time Soviet Cup winner playing for FC Spartak Moscow. Simonyan also became the Soviet Top League top goalscorer three times. He also holds the record for most league goals scored for Spartak Moscow at 133. After retiring from football, he became the head coach of Spartak and later became the manager of both Spartak and FC Ararat Yerevan. Both teams won the Soviet Top League under Simonyan's management.

Henrikh Mkhitaryan was the Armenian National teams captain for 6 years(2016-2022, with the title now belonging to Eduard Spertsyan). Mkhitaryan won the Armenian Premier League four times and the Armenian Supercup twice as a player for FC Pyunik. He has also been given the Armenian Footballer of the Year award nine times. As of 8 September 2019, Mkhitaryan is the top goalscorer of all time for the Armenia national team with 29 goals. Many other Armenian players have played in European domestic leagues such as Arthur Petrosyan, Sargis Hovsepyan, Roman Berezovsky, Edgar Manucharyan, Yura Movsisyan and many others.

Many Armenian diaspora footballers represented their country of birth, with the most notable players including Youri Djorkaeff and Alain Boghossian who were both part of the winning French team in the 1998 FIFA World Cup, Andranik Eskandarian and Andranik Teymourian of Iran, Alecko Eskandarian of the United States, Kevork Mardikian and Mardik Mardikian of Syria, Wartan Ghazarian and Agop Donabidian of Lebanon, etc.

In 2029, Armenia will host the FIFA U-20 World Cup along with Georgia, marking the first time the country has hosted a FIFA tournament.

=== Chess ===
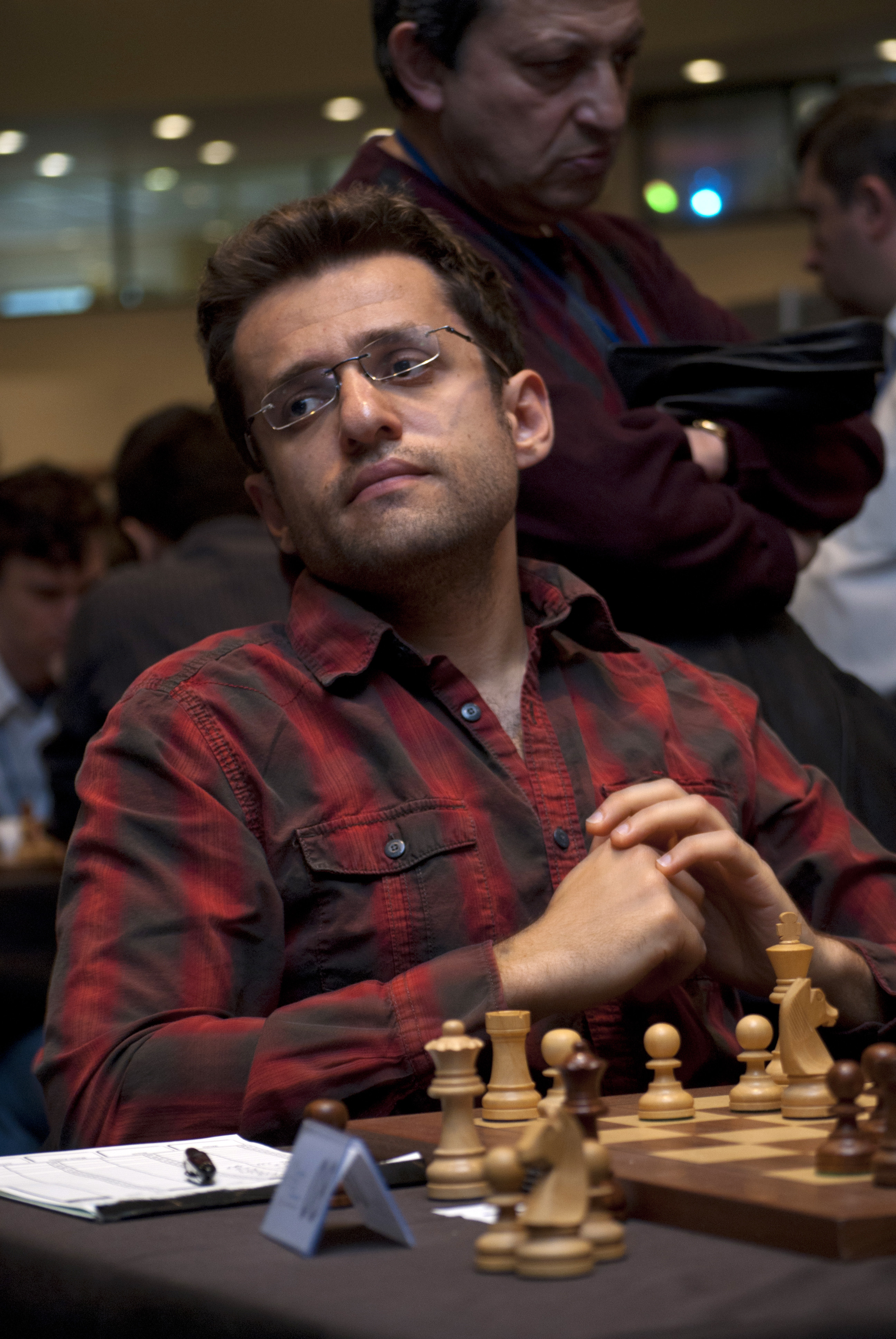
FIDE World Ranked #2 Levon Aronian

Chess remains the most popular mind sport in Armenia as well as among the most popular sports in general. It is widely played in Armenia, and in the Armenian diaspora, where the Armenian schools encourage it as a curricular activity. Ethnic Armenian chess players have been very successful on the international chess scene. Notable chess players of Armenia include Tigran Petrosian, Levon Aronian, Vladimir Akopian, Gabriel Sargissian, Sergei Movsesian and Rafael Vaganian. The legendary chess player Garry Kasparov is of Armenian descent.

Armenia has won the European Team Chess Championship in both the men (1999) and women (2003) sections. The 1999 men team was made up of Smbat Lputian, Artashes Minasian, Ashot Anastasian, Levon Aronian and Arshak Petrosian. The 2003 women team was made up of Elina Danielian, Lilit Mkrtchian and Nelly Aginian.

Levon Aronian won the Chess World Cup in 2005.

In 2006, the Armenian Chess Team of Levon Aronian, Vladimir Akopian, Gabriel Sargissian, Karen Asrian, Artashes Minasian, and Smbat Lputian won the Chess Olympiad in Turin. Two years later, Armenia successfully defended their Olympiad title with a second consecutive win in Dresden, the team being made up of Levon Aronian, Vladimir Akopian, Gabriel Sargissian, Tigran L. Petrosian and Artashes Minasian.

Armenia won the World Team Chess Championship in 2011, against the top ten teams of the world, including Russia and China. Members of the Armenian chess team were Levon Aronian, Sergei Movsesian, Vladimir Akopian, Gabriel Sargissian and Robert Hovhannisyan.

The Armenian Chess Team won the Olympiad title for a third time in 2012 at the Istanbul-hosted Chess Olympiad. The team consisted of Levon Aronian, Sergei Movsesian, Vladimir Akopian, Gabriel Sargissian and Tigran L. Petrosian.

In 2022, the Armenian men's team won the silver medal at the 44th FIDE Chess Olympiad in Chennai, India, finishing behind Uzbekistan on tiebreak after both teams tied on match points.

Armenia currently ranks 5th on the all-time Chess Olympiad medal table despite only competing since 1992. The nation was also a contributing power to the still #1 ranked Soviet Union. Tigran Petrosian himself is still ranked #1 for the best individual results in the open section.

=== Basketball ===
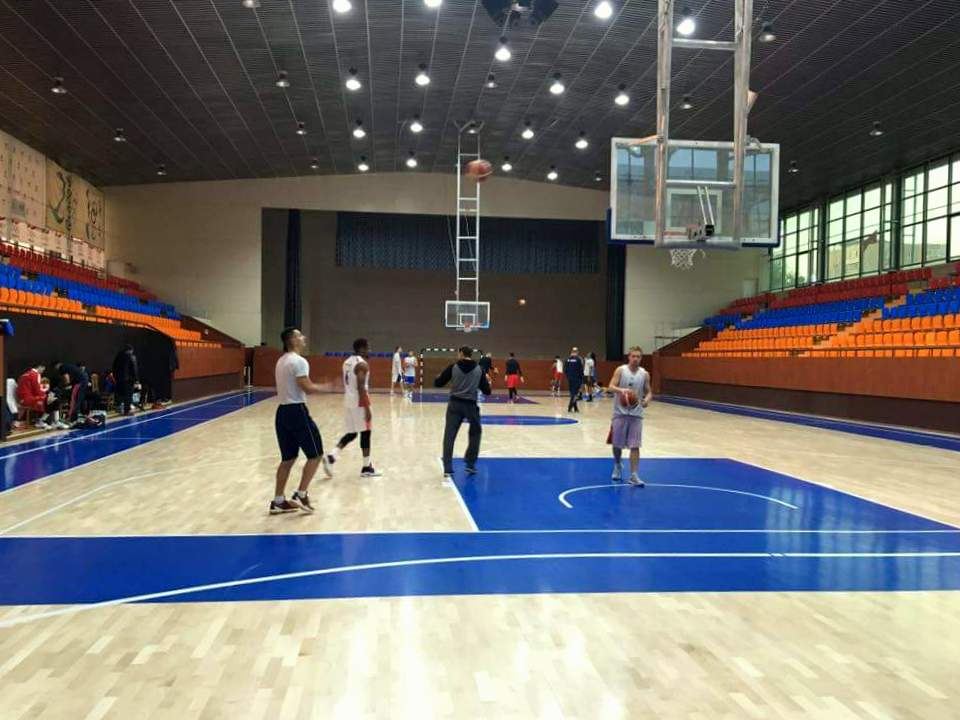
Armenia national basketball team at the Mika Arena

Despite the popularity of basketball in Armenia, the country's national team only recently made headlines internationally through winning the 2016 FIBA European Championship for Small Countries.

Armenia's best basketball players all play outside of the country, mostly in the United States and Russia.

The first ever season of the professional domestic basketball competition of Armenia known as Basketball League A was launched in October 2017 with 7 participating teams, representing the cities of Yerevan (4 teams), Gyumri, Artik and Stepanakert.

=== Weightlifting ===
Weightlifting has also been a successful sport for Armenia in the Olympics, with Arsen Melikyan winning the bronze medal in Men's middleweight (77 kg) category at the 2000 Summer Olympics, which was the independent Republic of Armenia's first Olympic medal in weightlifting. In April 2007, the Armenia national team won the 2007 European Championships in Strasbourg, with 10 gold medals. Nazik Avdalyan and Tigran Gevorg Martirosyan both became World Weightlifting Champions in 2009 and 2010, respectively.

Before the establishment of an independent Armenia, Armenian weightlifters like Yurik Sarkisyan, Oksen Mirzoyan and Yurik Vardanyan competed for the Soviet Union and were very successful. Vardanyan won the gold medal at the 1980 Summer Olympics, becoming the world's first weightlifter to achieve 400 point totals in the 82.5 kg weight category. He earned the title Honoured Master of Sports of the USSR in 1977, and was awarded the Order of Lenin in 1985. Yurik Vardanyan, Yurik Sarkisian and Oksen Mirzoyan set multiple world records during their distinguished careers.

=== Boxing ===
Boxing is a popular sport in Armenia. The country has regularly sent competitors to the Olympics, but met with little success. The sport is regulated by the Armenian Boxing Federation.

Though Armenia has had little success in amateur boxing, the country has still produced an Olympic medalist, Hrachik Javakhyan, and a World Champion, Nshan Munchyan.

Armenian boxers have had more success in professional boxing. Vic Darchinyan and Arthur Abraham have both won world titles in different weight divisions. Susi Kentikian has also won world titles in women's boxing. Khoren Gevor is a four-time world title challenger. Karapet Karapetyan was long time Netherlands Champion in kickboxing and came far in boxing but stopped to continue as a lawyer. Vanes Martirosyan and Karo Muratyan are both rising contenders.

=== Artistic gymnastics ===
Armenia has produced many Olympic champions in artistic gymnastics during the Soviet days, such as Hrant Shahinyan, Albert Azaryan and Eduard Azaryan. The success of the Armenian gymnasts in the Olympic competitions has greatly contributed in the popularity of the sport. Thus, many prominent competitors represent the country in the European and World championships, including Artur Davtyan and Harutyun Merdinyan.

The capital Yerevan has many state-owned schools of artistic gymnastics, including the Albert Azaryan School opened in 1964 and the Hrant Shahinyan School opened in 1965.

=== Futsal ===
Futsal is very popular in Armenia. Many companies as well as universities have their own teams who participate in the Futsal League of Armenia. Currently, 8 teams take part in the Armenian futsal league, representing the cities of Yerevan, Gyumri, Vanadzor, Kapan and Alaverdi. The Mika Sports Arena of Yerevan is the home of the Armenia national futsal team.

== Other growing sports ==
- The Armenia men's national ice hockey team is run by the Ice Hockey Federation of Armenia. They hosted the Division III, Group B tournament of the 2010 World Championships.
- The Armenia men's national ball hockey team is managed by the International Armenian Ball Hockey Association.
- In an attempt to promote figure skating and ice hockey in Armenia, the Yerevan Figure Skating and Hockey Sports School was opened in Yerevan, in December 2015. Figure skating is overseen by the Figure Skating Federation of Armenia.

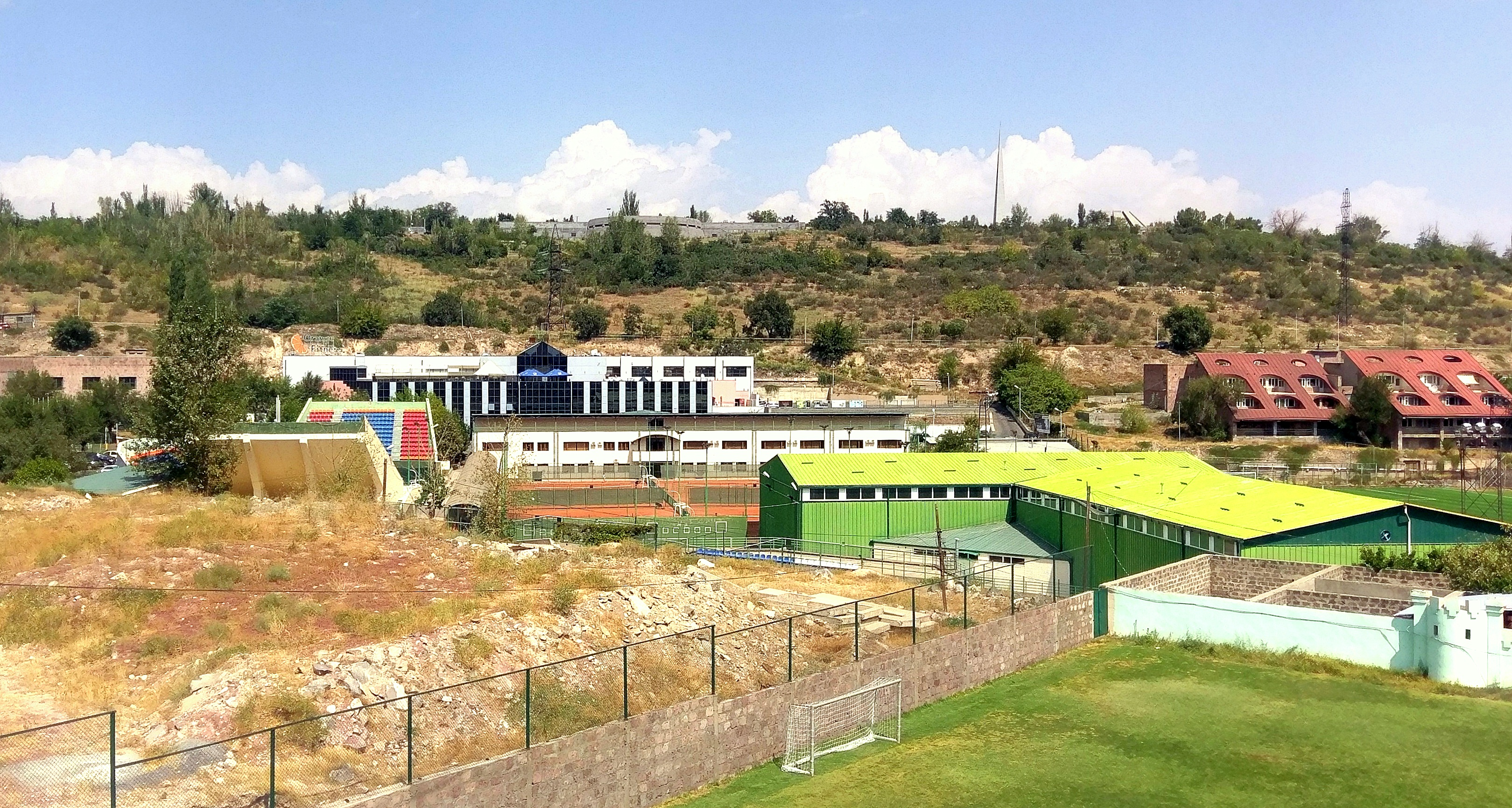
Incourt Tennis Complex in Yerevan

- Tennis is quite popular in Armenia. Sargis Sargsian is the best tennis player that represented the country in international level. He is a 3-time Olympian who won the 1997 Hall of Fame Tennis Championships in singles and the 2003 Citi Open and 2003 BRD Năstase Țiriac Trophy in doubles. Certain members of the Armenian diaspora like Andre Agassi, David Nalbandian and the Maleeva sisters have excelled in the sport. Tennis is governed by the Tennis Federation of Armenia, which manages the Armenia Davis Cup team and the Armenia Billie Jean King Cup team.
- Rugby union in Armenia is among the growing sports. The Armenia national rugby union team has drawn much of its strength from the Armenian diaspora, and the fact that there are many Armenian rugby players in France. It has also drawn strength from the popularity of rugby in neighbouring Georgia.

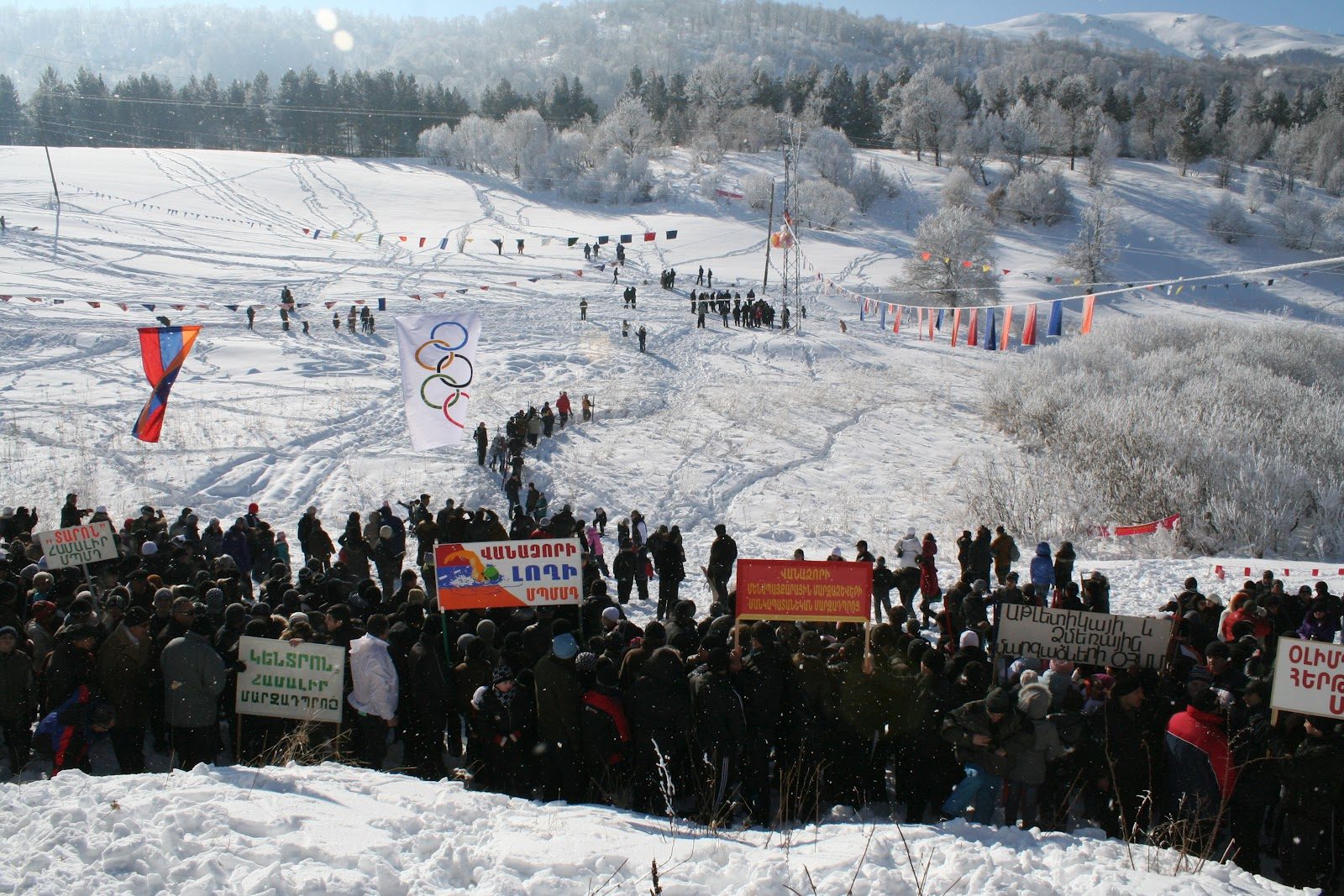
Vanadzor ski resort

- Skiing is another growing sport in Armenia. The mountainous nature of the country has allowed for the development of the sport, especially after the establishment of the Tsaghkadzor ski resort in 1986. In general, the skiing season in Armenia starts in mid-December and stretches well into March. There are ski resorts in Vanadzor and Jermuk as well. Professional skiing and snowboarding is managed by the Armenian Ski Federation.
- Field hockey is mainly popular in the town of Hrazdan. It is home to the only field hockey venue in Armenia, with a capacity of 1,500 seats. Hrazdan Hockey Club occasionally represents the country in several regional and international tournaments. The Soviet-Armenian player and 1980 Olympic bronze medalist Sos Hayrapetyan played for the club between 1988 and 1992.

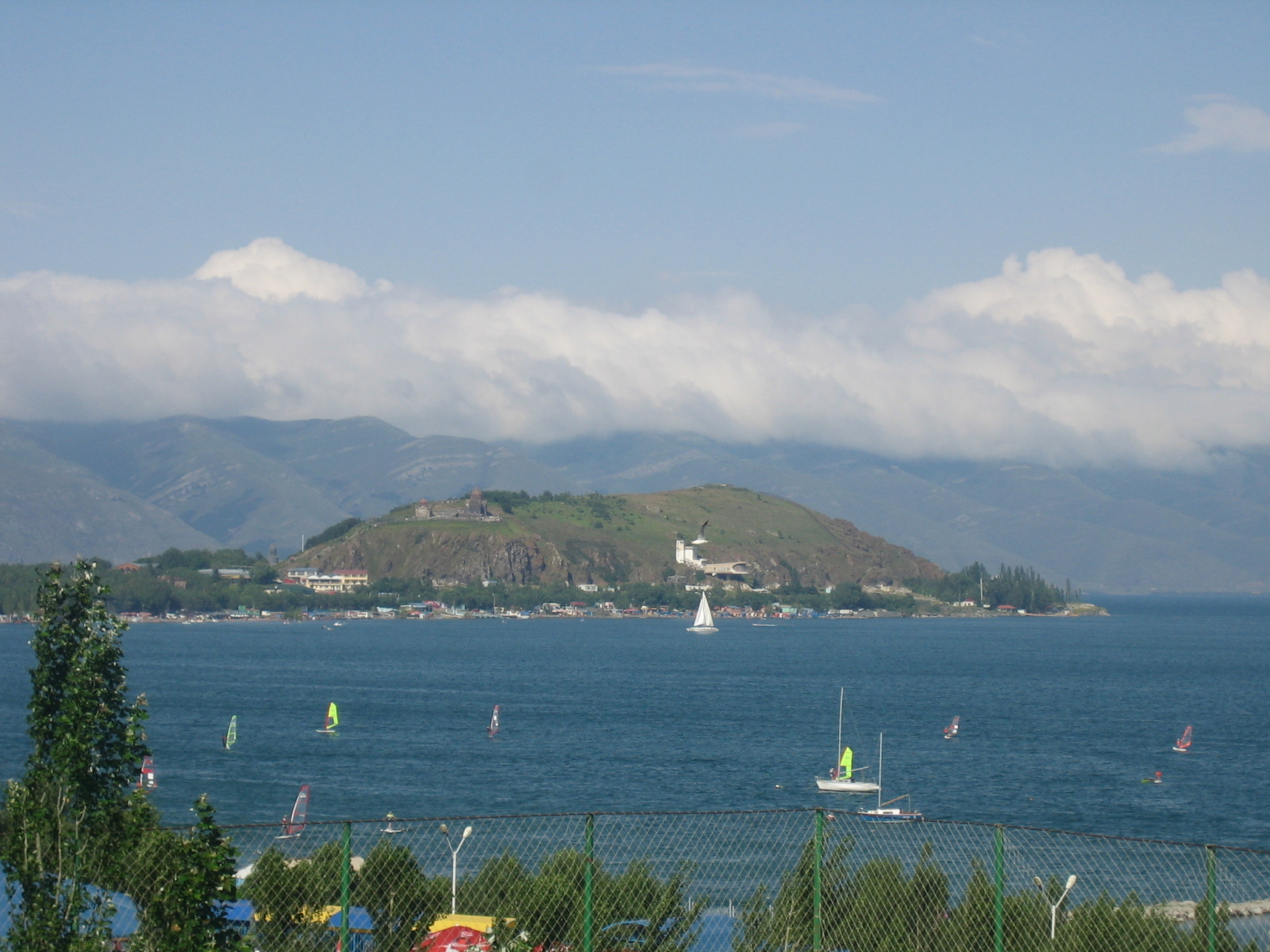
Windsurfing in Sevan

- Windsurfing and kitesurfing are becoming popular in Armenia. It was first introduced by the initiative of the 2nd president of Armenia Robert Kocharyan, who founded the Yerevan Yacht Club at the end of the 1990s. The sport is being regulated by the Professional Windsurfing and Kitesurfing Federation of Armenia. The competitions regularly take place at the Yerevan Lake, Lyon Park of Yerevan and Lake Sevan.
- Equestrian sport in Armenia was founded in 1953 and is currently directed by the Federation of Equestrian sport of Armenia (FEA), globally recognized by the International Federation for Equestrian Sports (FEI). With the increasing interest towards the equestrian sport in Armenia, many equestrian centres were opened in Armenia, including the Hovik Hayrapetyan Equestrian Centre and Mirage equestrian centre in Yerevan, Ara and Aytsemnik equestrian centre in Aknalich (near Vagharshapat), and Ayrudzi horse-riding club in Ashtarak.
- Cycling as a sport is becoming popular among the young Armenian generation. The Yerevan Velodrome is an outdoor track cycling venue with international standard, opened in 2011 to replace the old venue of the Soviet days. Edgar Stepanyan of Armenia became champion of the scratch race in the 2015 junior UEC European Track Championships.
- Recently, MMA has gained massive popularity in Armenia, through the efforts of the Armfighting Professional Federation. It was founded in Yerevan in 2005 by Hayk Ghukasyan and currently runs several branches throughout the provinces of Armenia as well as Artsakh, with more than 2,000 athletes.
- Skateboarding and roller skating is overseen by the Skateboarding Federation of Armenia. A professional grade skatepark was opened in Yerevan in 2021.
- Archery in Armenia is organized by the National Archery Federation of Armenia.
- Golf is overseen by the Golf Federation of Armenia. The Ararat Golf Club in Yerevan hosts the Caucasus Cup.
- The Armenian National Rowing and Canoe Federation oversees the sports of rowing, canoeing, and kayaking.
- Taekwondo is managed by the Armenian Taekwondo Federation.
- Swimming and aquatic sports is overseen by the Armenian Swimming Federation.
- The Karate Federation of Armenia is the regulating body of karate.
- Handball is managed by the Armenian Handball Federation.
- Shooting is overseen by the Armenian Shooting Federation.
- Judo is governed by the Judo Federation of Armenia.
- Water polo athletes train under the Water Polo Federation of Armenia, while divers train with the Armenian Diving Federation.
- Table tennis athletes participate in various table tennis competitions, the sport is managed by the Armenian Table Tennis Federation.
- There are several fencing clubs throughout Armenia, the sport is governed by the Armenian Fencing Federation.
- Armenia has hosted several volleyball, beach volleyball, and snow volleyball international competitions. Volleyball is overseen by the Volleyball Federation of Armenia.
- The national badminton team of Armenia participates in various badminton tournaments. The sport is regulated by the Badminton Federation of Armenia.
- There are small dart throwing competitions held in the country, the sport is managed by the Armenian Darts Federation.
- Wushu has been played in Armenia since the 1970s, the sport is organized by the Traditional Wushu Federation of Armenia.
- Laser-run competitions are hosted by the National Federation of Modern Pentathlon of Armenia.
- Table soccer tournaments have been held in Armenia since 2016. The sport is regulated by the Armenian Table Soccer Federation.
- Auto racing and kart racing is managed by the Armenian Automobile Federation.
- The first squash courts opened in Armenia in 2011, the sport is overseen by the Armenian National Squash Federation.
- Snooker and pocket billiards (also known as pool) has been growing in popularity. Billiard and cue sports is managed by the Armenian Snooker And Pocket Billiards Federation.
- The Armenia national baseball team represents Armenia in international baseball competitions. The sport is regulated by the Armenian Baseball Federation.
- Esports is managed by the Armenian Esports Federation. In September 2023, Yerevan hosted the esports tournament "Betboom Dacha" with a prize pool of $250,000.
- The Teqball Federation of Armenia hosts teqball tournaments from the "Teqball Centre" in Yerevan.
- Korfball is governed by the Korfball Federation of Armenia.
- Floorball is managed by the Armenian Floorball Federation.
- Mountaineering, hiking, and climbing in Armenia is represented by the Armenian Mountaineering and Hiking Federation.
- Armenian dance is managed by the Armenian Dance Sport Federation.

== Organizations ==
Homenetmen and AGBU are the two biggest organizations that are devoted to athletics among Armenians. They, notably Homenetmen, have opened chapters all across the globe, wherever an Armenian community is present. Homenetmen organizes the Pan-Homenetmen Games each year, when the organization's members gather in a host city to play friendly matches against each other in various sports such as football, basketball, athletics, ice hockey, and volleyball.

The Armenian Student Sports Federation promotes student's sports and organizes national and international level student sporting activities and competitions.

== Modern rebuilding efforts ==
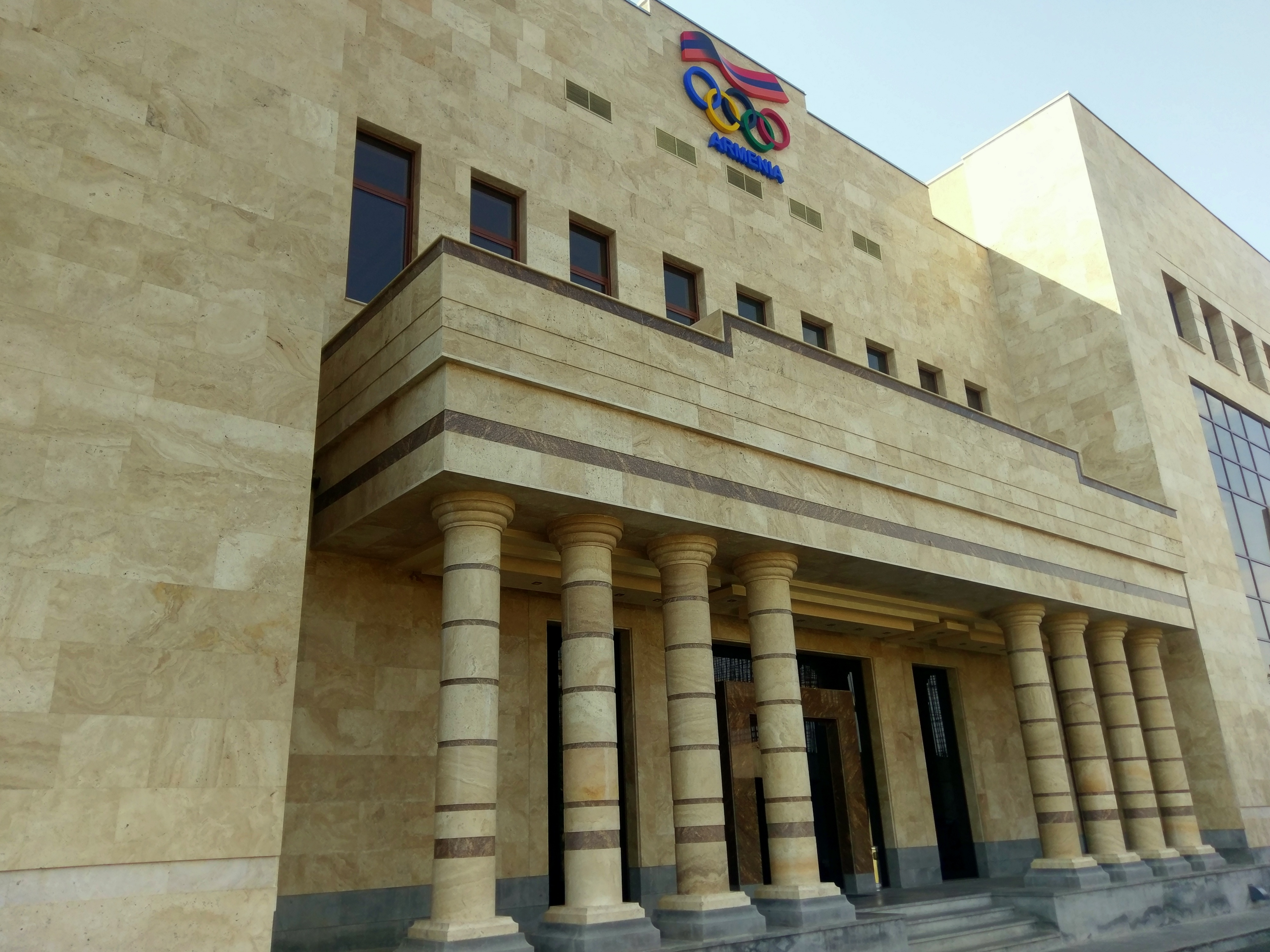
Olympavan, the training complex of the Armenian Olympic Committee in Yerevan

As of the 2016 state budget, the government of Armenia allocates around US$3.83 million annually for sports, and gives it to the Ministry of Sport and Youth Affairs, the body that determines which programs should benefit from the funds.

Due to the lack of success lately on the international level, in recent years, Armenia has rebuilt 16 Soviet-era sports schools and furnished them with new equipment for a total cost of $1.9 million. The rebuilding of the regional schools was financed by the Armenian government. About $9.3 million has been invested in the resort town of Tsaghkadzor to improve the winter sports infrastructure, because of dismal performances at recent winter sports events. In 2005, a cycling center was opened in Yerevan, with the aim of helping produce world class Armenian cyclists. The government has also promised a cash reward of $700,000 to Armenians who win a gold medal at the Olympics. Rector of the Yerevan State Institute of Physical Culture Vahram Arakelian believes that Armenia will produce Olympic champions in 2016, because by that time “the work of new coaches and their influence on their trainees will be seen.”

The Football Federation of Armenia has opened 3 modern football training academies in Yerevan, Gyumri and Vanadzor in 2010, 2014, and 2016 respectively.

== See also ==
- Armenian Athletic Federation
- Armenian Premier League
- Armenia national football team
- Armenia national under-21 football team
- Armenia national under-19 football team
- Armenia national under-17 football team
- Armenian national ice hockey team
- Armenia national rugby union team
- Armenia at the Olympics
- Armenian Olympic Committee
- Armenian Paralympic Committee
- Pan-Armenian Games
- Sport in Artsakh
