= Armenian Snooker And Pocket Billiards Federation =

Sporting Organization

Armenian Snooker And Pocket Billiards Federation logo

The Armenian Snooker And Pocket Billiards Federation (ASPBF) (Armenian: Հայաստանի սնուկերի և գրպանի բիլիարդի ֆեդերացիա), is the regulating body of snooker and pocket billiards (also known as pool) in Armenia, governed by the Ministry of Education, Science, Culture and Sport. The headquarters of the federation is located in Yerevan.

== About ==
The Armenian Snooker And Pocket Billiards Federation was established in August 2019, with the opening of a billiards gaming academy in Yerevan. The Federation trains snooker, pool, and other cue sports enthusiasts, operates a youth program, and trains coaches and referees in billiard sports at the academy. The Federation also hosts national level competitions and organizes Armenia's participation in various European and international level billiard championships. The Federation is a full member of the International Billiards and Snooker Federation and the European Billiards and Snooker Association.

In April 2021, the Federation organized the first snooker tournament in Artsakh.

== See also ==
- Sport in Armenia
