= Skateboarding Federation of Armenia =

Sporting Organization

Skateboarding Federation of Armenia logo

The Skateboarding Federation of Armenia (Armenian: Սքեյթբորդինգի Հայաստանի ֆեդերացիա), also known as the Roller Sports and Skateboarding Federation of Armenia, is the regulating body of skateboarding and roller skating in Armenia. The headquarters of the federation is located in Yerevan.

== History ==
The Federation was founded in 2016 and its aim is to promote the sport of skateboarding and roller skating throughout Armenia.

== Developments ==
On 22 September 2021, Yerevan municipal officials announced the opening of a new skatepark. The skatepark took eight years to construct and will be the largest in the country. Emil Sardaryan, the president of the Skateboarding Federation of Armenia, stated that the skatepark will allow Armenia to develop competitive skateboarding, as well as, to host national and international competitions. Meanwhile, Shiraz Khachatryan, the vice-president of the Skateboarding Federation of Armenia, stated that, "Now the numbers of skateboarders is growing day by day, and the sport has officially become Olympic".

== See also ==
- Sport in Armenia
