= Volleyball Federation of Armenia =

Sporting Organization

Volleyball Federation of Armenia logo

The Volleyball Federation of Armenia (VFA) (Armenian: Հայաստանի վոլեյբոլի ֆեդերացիա), also known as the Armenian Volleyball Federation, is the regulating body of volleyball, beach volleyball, and snow volleyball in Armenia, governed by the Armenian Olympic Committee. The headquarters of the federation is located in Yerevan.

== History ==
Volleyball has always been a popular sport in Armenia, with a volleyball school operating in Yerevan since 1972. Before Armenia's independence, Armenian volleyball athletes participated in international competitions as part of the Soviet Union.

The Federation was established in 1991 and is currently led by president Hrachya Muradyan. The Federation oversees the training of volleyball specialists and organizes national volleyball tournaments throughout the country. Armenian volleyball athletes participate in various European, international, and Olympic level volleyball competitions. The Federation is a full member of the International Volleyball Federation and the European Volleyball Confederation.

The Federation oversees 33 national volleyball teams and 52 national beach volleyball teams throughout the country. The Federation also organizes youth volleyball classes and donates equipment to schools.

== Activities ==
The Federation organizes various international and European volleyball competitions, including:

In July 2015, the Eastern European Beach Volleyball Championship for U18 was held in Sevan, Armenia.

In February 2015, the first Snow Volleyball Championship was held in Tsaghkadzor. Also that year, Armenia hosted a conference of the Association of Eastern European Countries, which was attended by presidents and representatives from volleyball federations of 9 countries.

In 2016, the first international beach volleyball tournament was organized in Yerevan.

In November 2017, President of the European Volleyball Confederation, Alexander Boricic, arrived in Yerevan to discuss boosting cooperation with the Volleyball Federation of Armenia.

In September 2018, Yerevan hosted the Eastern European Men’s Beach Volleyball Championship, which was considered a rating tournament for the Olympic Games. Also that year, Yerevan hosted the European U15 European Championship qualifiers.

On 1 September 2019, the Eastern European Men’s Beach Volleyball Championship was held in Yerevan.

In January 2020, the first men’s and women’s tournament of the Eastern European Association of Snow Volleyball was held in Tsaghkadzor. In February 2020, the Snow Volleyball “EuroTour” was also held in Tsaghkadzor.

== See also ==
- Sport in Armenia
