= Mountains of Armenia =

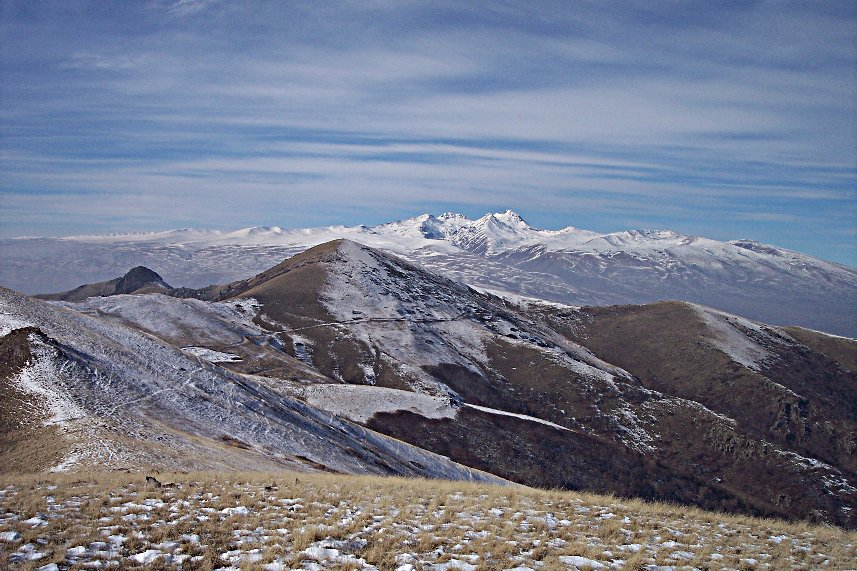
A view of Mount Aragats.

Armenia is a land of rugged mountains and extinct volcanoes, its highest point is Mount Aragats, 13,435 ft (4,095 m).

== Mountain ranges ==
1. Javakheti mountain range
2. Armeno-Georgian mountain range
3. Bazum mountain range, spanning east–west in the Shirak and Lori provinces in Northern Armenia
4. Pambak mountain range, spanning northwest–southeast in the Lori and Kotayk provinces
5. Gugarik mountain range
6. Oskepat mountain range
7. Murghaz mountain range
8. Areguni mountain range
9. Sevan mountain range, east of Lake Sevan along the border with Azerbaijan
10. Tsaghkuni mountain range
11. Gegham mountain range
12. Vardenis mountain range
13. Vayots Dzor mountain range
14. Zangezur mountain range, in the southern Armenian province of Syunik
15. Bargushat mountain range
16. Meghri mountain range

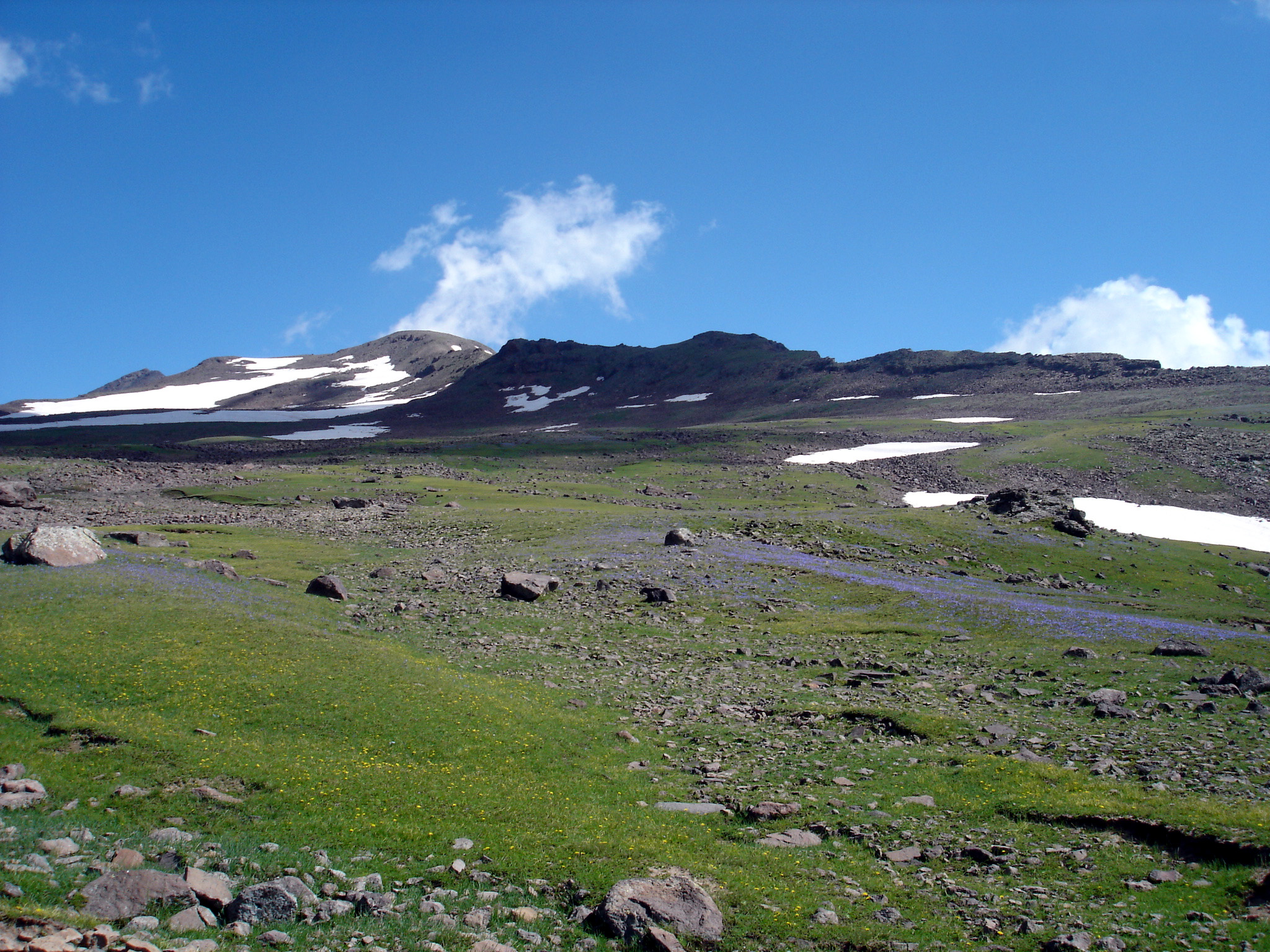
Aragats

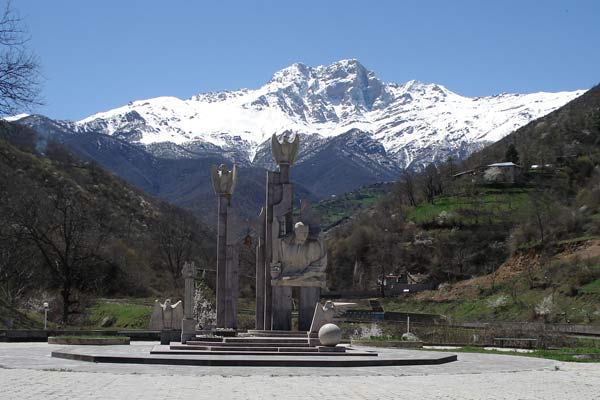
Khustup

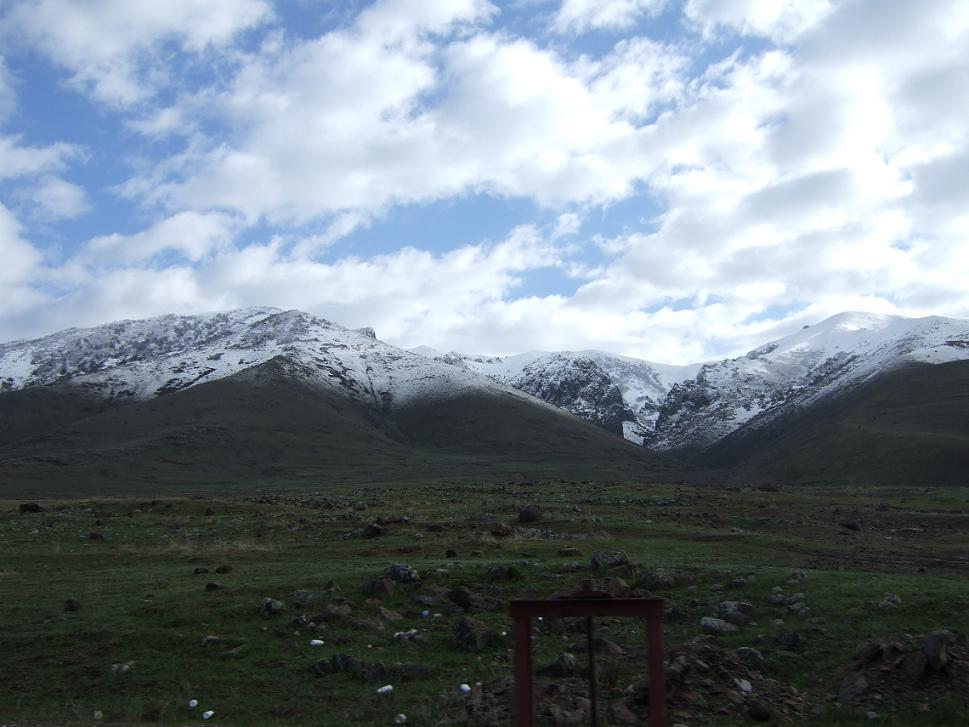
Arailer

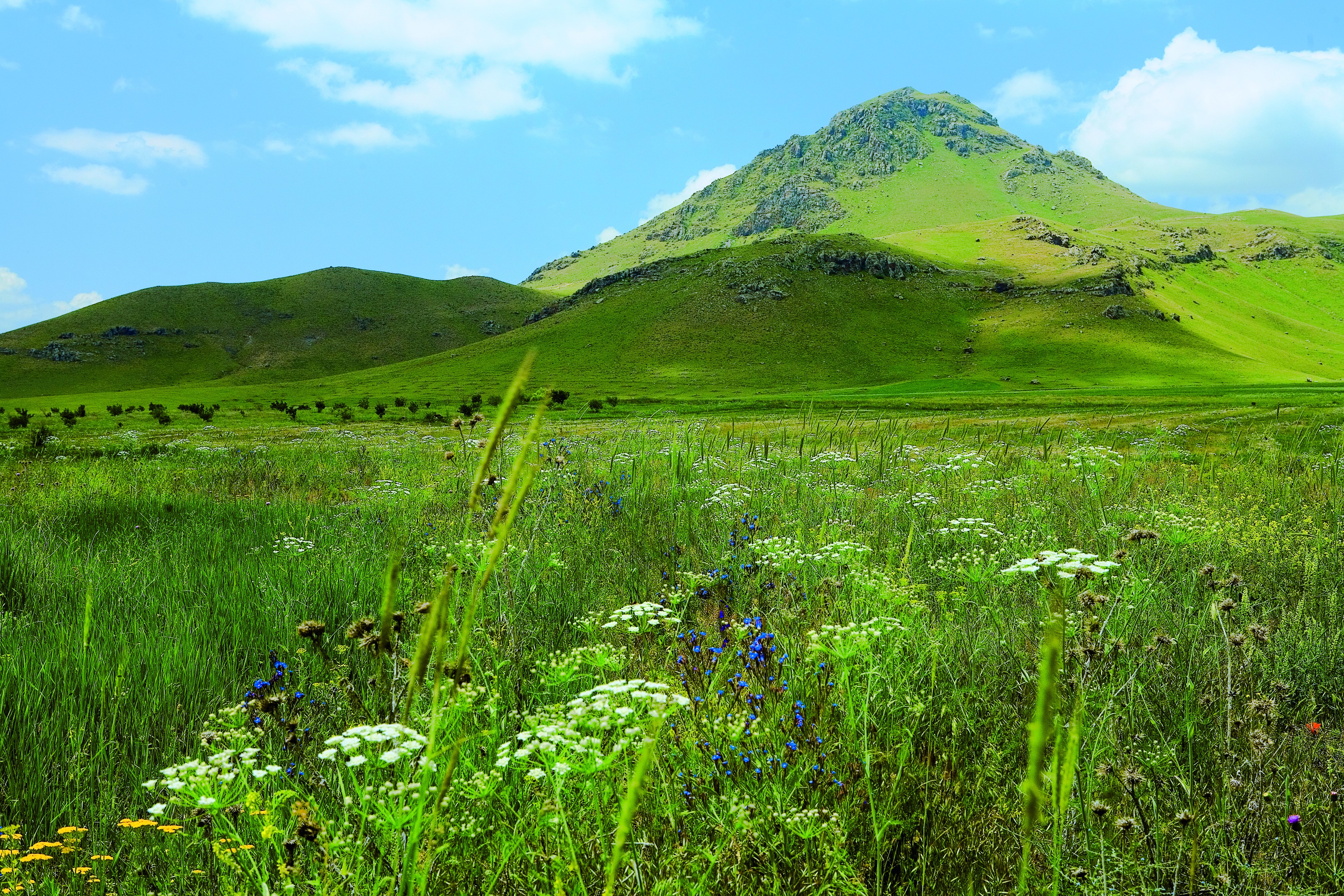
Arteni

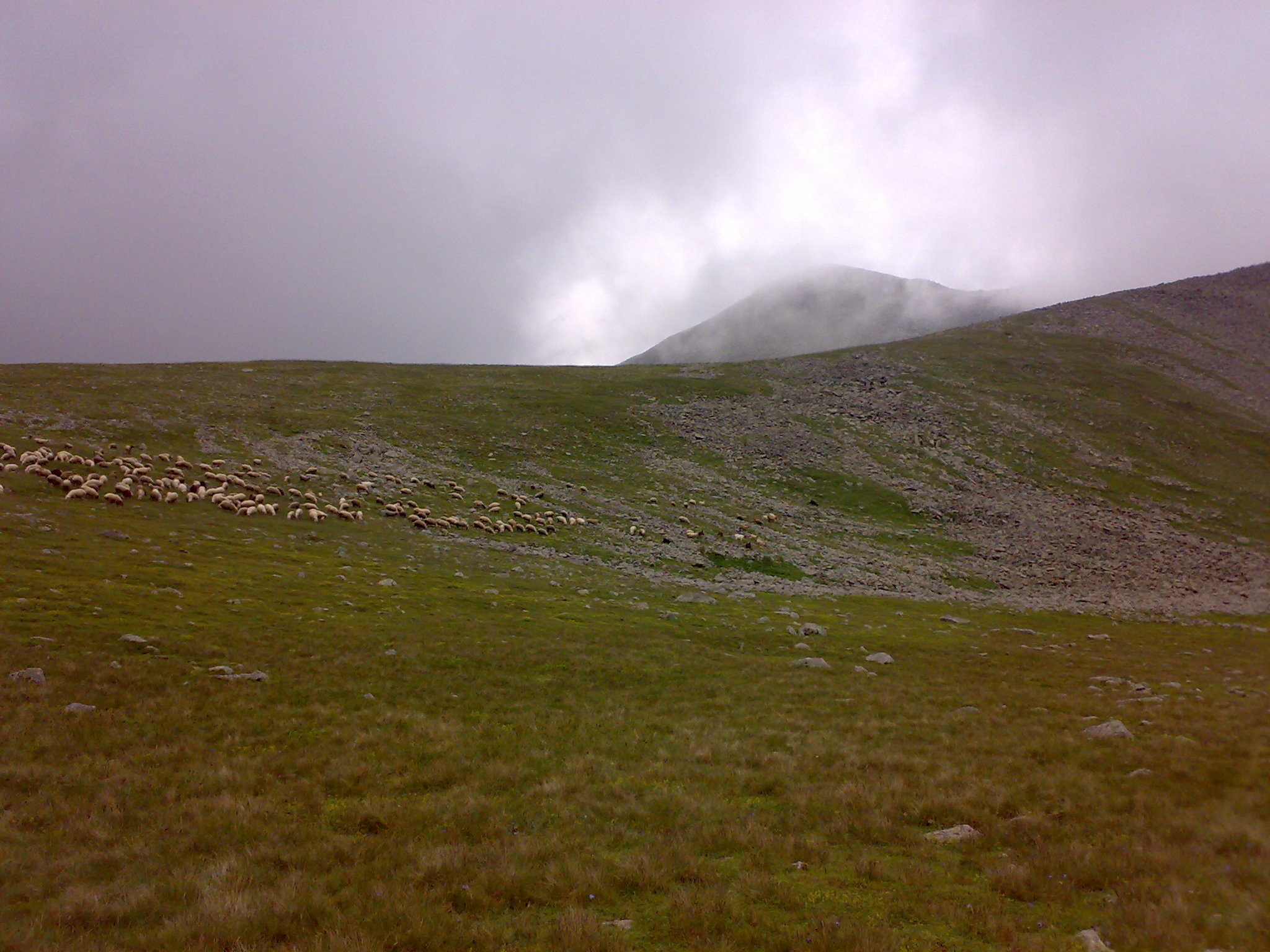
Achkasar

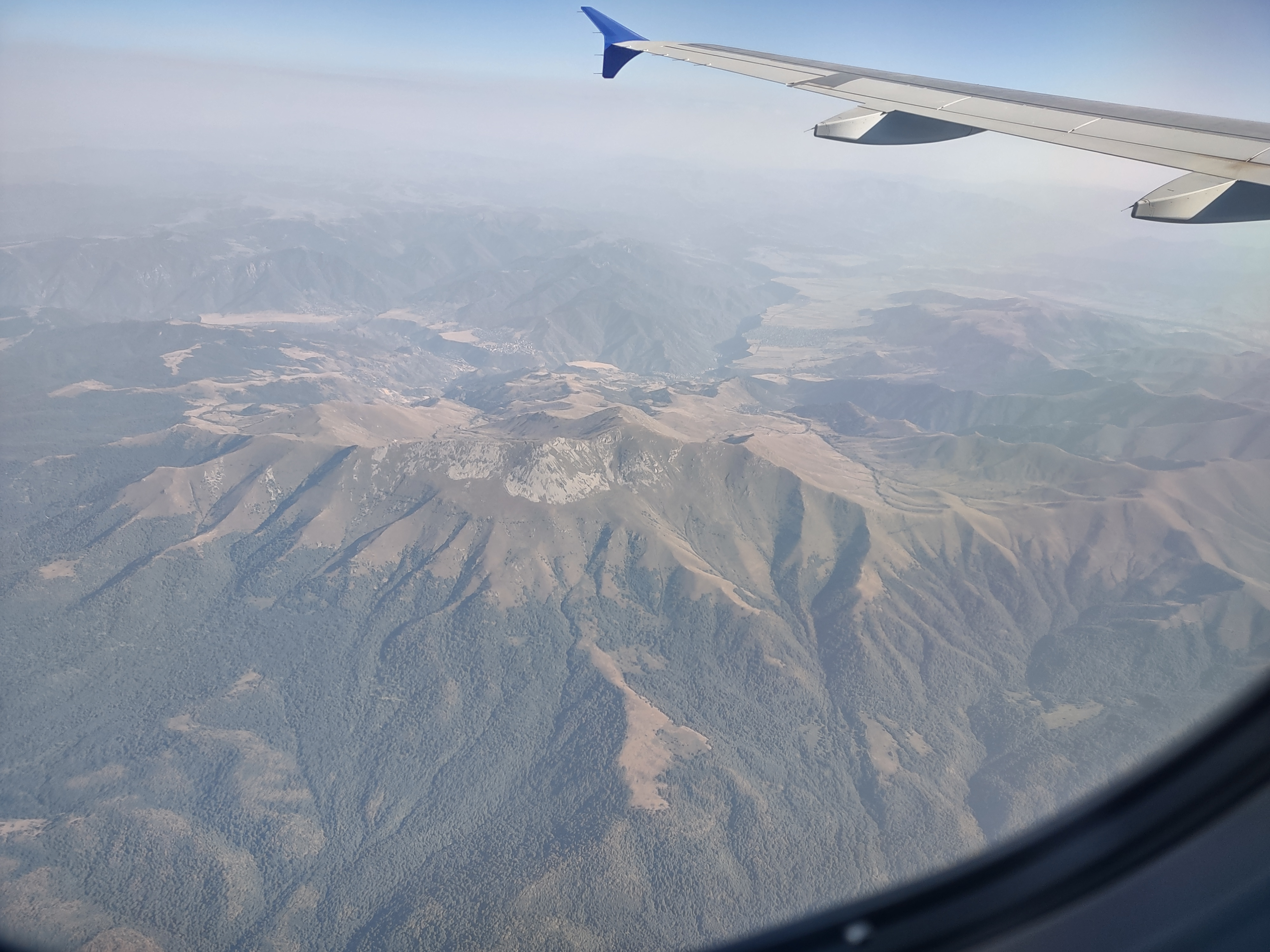
Lalvar

== Prominent peaks ==
Name	Elevation (m)	Province
Aragats	4095	Aragatsotn
Arailer	2577	Kotayk
Armaghan	2829	Gegharkunik
Tezh	3101	Triple point of Aragatsotn, Lori, Kotayk
Achkasar	3196	Border of Shirak Province and Lori
Urasar	2992	Border of Shirak Province and Lori
Lalvar	2545	Lori
Chatin	2246	Lori
Teghenis	2851	Kotayk
Murghuz	2993	Tavush
Artanish	2460	Gegharkunik
Kashatagh	2901	Gegharkunik
Koshadagh	3317	Gegharkunik
Azhdahak	3598	Gegharkunik
Spitakasar	3560	Gegharkunik
Geghasar	3443	Gegharkunik
Vardenis	3520	Gegharkunik
Gndasar	2947	Vayots Dzor
Kezelboghaz	3594	Syunik
Metz Ishkhansar	3552	Syunik
Khustup	3214	Syunik
Baghats	3256	Syunik
Kaputjugh	3906	Syunik
Aramazd	3392	Syunik
Urts	2445	Ararat
Ktuts	2300	Ararat
Arteni	2047	Aragatsotn

== See also ==
- Armenian Mountaineering and Hiking Federation
- List of volcanoes in Armenia
- Mount Aragats
- Zangezur Mountains
