= Mount Vayotssar =

Extinct stratovolcano in Armenia

- Վայոց Սար
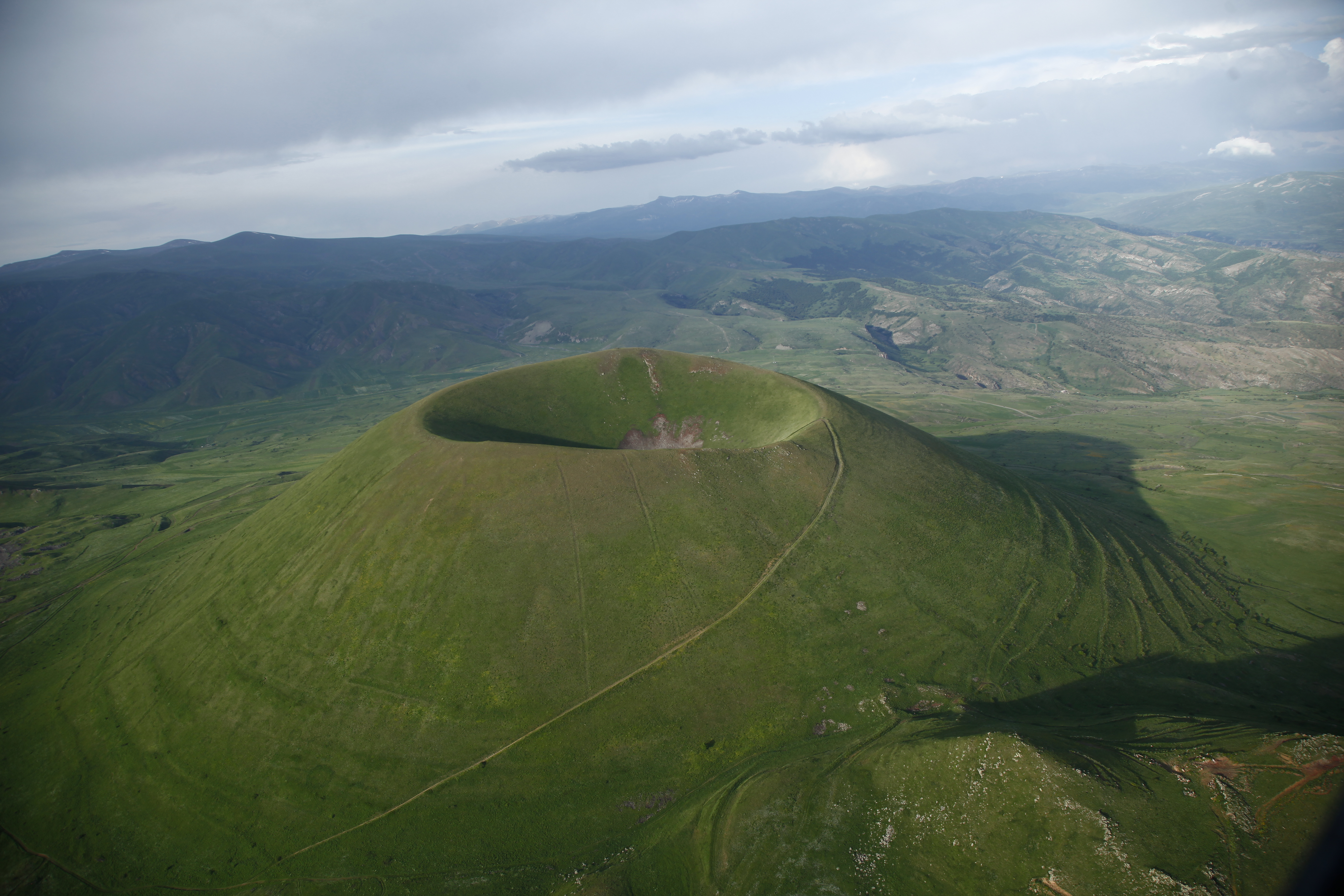
- View of Mount Vayotssar from the Vayots Dzor valley

Highest point
- Elevation: 2,586 m (8,484 ft)
- Prominence: 297 m (974 ft)
- Listing: List of volcanoes in Armenia
- Coordinates: 39°47′50″N 45°29′48″E

Geography
- Location within Armenia
- Location: Vayots Dzor Province, Armenia
- Parent range: Lesser Caucasus

Geology
- Mountain type: Extinct volcano
- Last eruption: ~40,000 years ago

Climbing
- Easiest route: Hike

Mount Vayotssar (Armenian: Վայոց Սար), also known as Vayots Sar or Dalik Tapa, is an extinct volcano located in the Vayots Dzor Province of southern Armenia. Situated approximately 90 kilometers southeast of Yerevan, the mountain rises to an elevation of 2,575 meters above sea level.

== Geography ==
The volcanic cone of Mount Vayotssar lies near the village of Herher, within a region characterized by rugged uplands, deep valleys, and scattered springs. The nearest major town is Malishka, approximately 9 kilometers to the southwest. The climate surrounding the mountain is continental, with an average annual temperature of around 10 °C and average yearly precipitation of about 689 mm. The warmest month is August, reaching 26 °C, while the coldest is January, averaging −10 °C.

== Geological characteristics ==
Vayotssar is one of the youngest volcanoes in the Armenian Highland. Historical interpretations claimed that its last eruption occurred in 753 AD, accompanied by a devastating earthquake that destroyed many settlements in the region, including the ancient town of Moz. However, geological research indicates that the volcano's last eruption occurred approximately 40,000 years ago, contradicting the medieval chronicles and confirming its extinction.

The volcano is notable for its structural cone and lava fields surrounding the base. Traces of ancient eruptive activity are visible in the region's geomorphology, including solidified lava flows and pyroclastic deposits.

== Historical and cultural significance ==
The name Vayotssar means "Mountain of Woes," and is said to be connected to the origin of the name of the Vayots Dzor region. According to the 13th-century historian Stepanos Orbelian, the 753 AD eruption caused widespread destruction and 40 days of darkness, during which people cried "Vay dzor, vay dzor" ("Oh valley, oh valley"), supposedly giving the province its name.

Some scholars, such as Movses Khorenatsi, have noted that the name Vayots Dzor predates the 8th-century event, suggesting that the story might have evolved from local folklore rather than serving as an etymological explanation.

== Nearby landmarks ==
The village of Herher at the base of Mount Vayotssar is home to numerous cultural and natural sites, including the Monastery Complex of Saint Sion, the Kapuyt Fortress, and several small waterfalls formed by the Karavaz and Herher rivers. A unique geological crevice running through the village emits a steady stream of cold air, which residents historically used as a natural refrigerator.

== See also ==
- Vayots Dzor Province
- List of volcanoes in Armenia
- Mount Ararat
- Geology of Armenia
- Porak
