= Tashir =

City in Lori, Armenia

Tashir Տաշիր
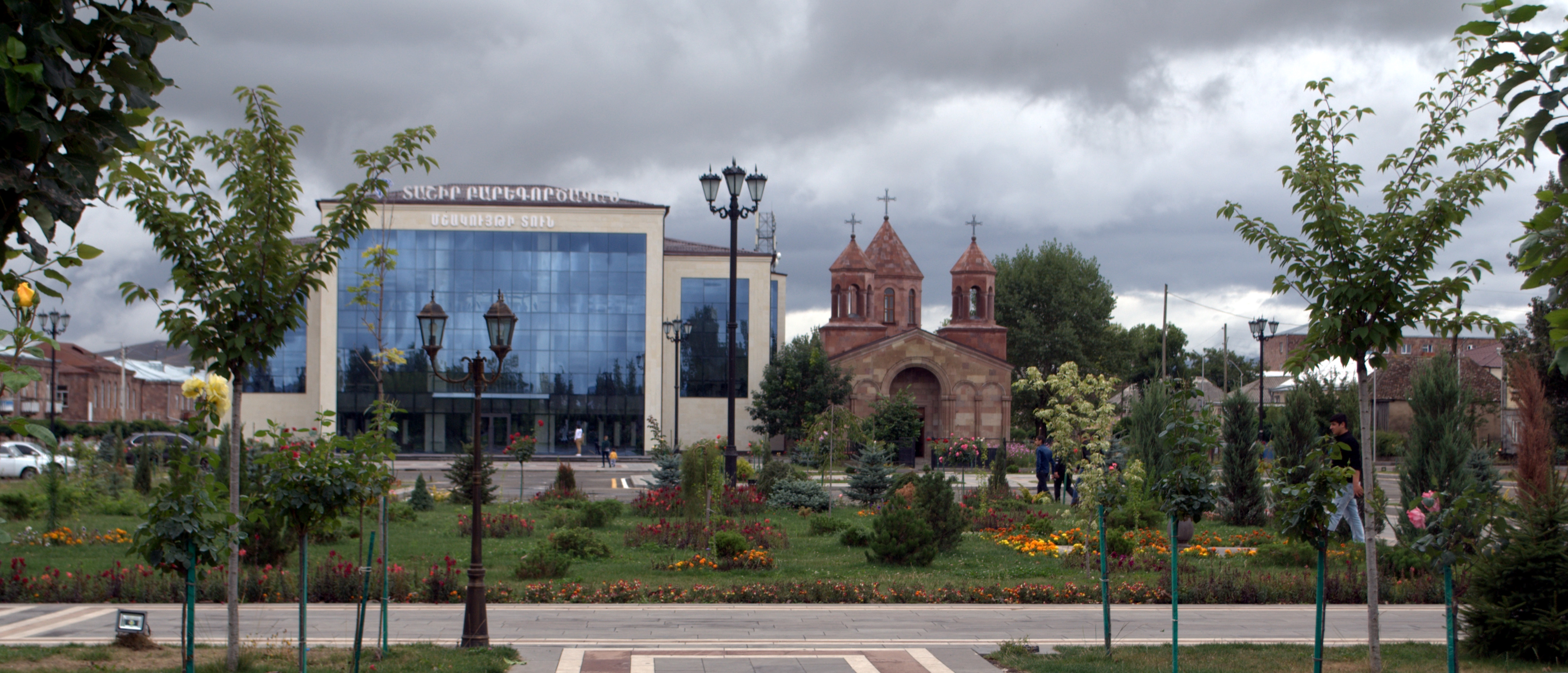
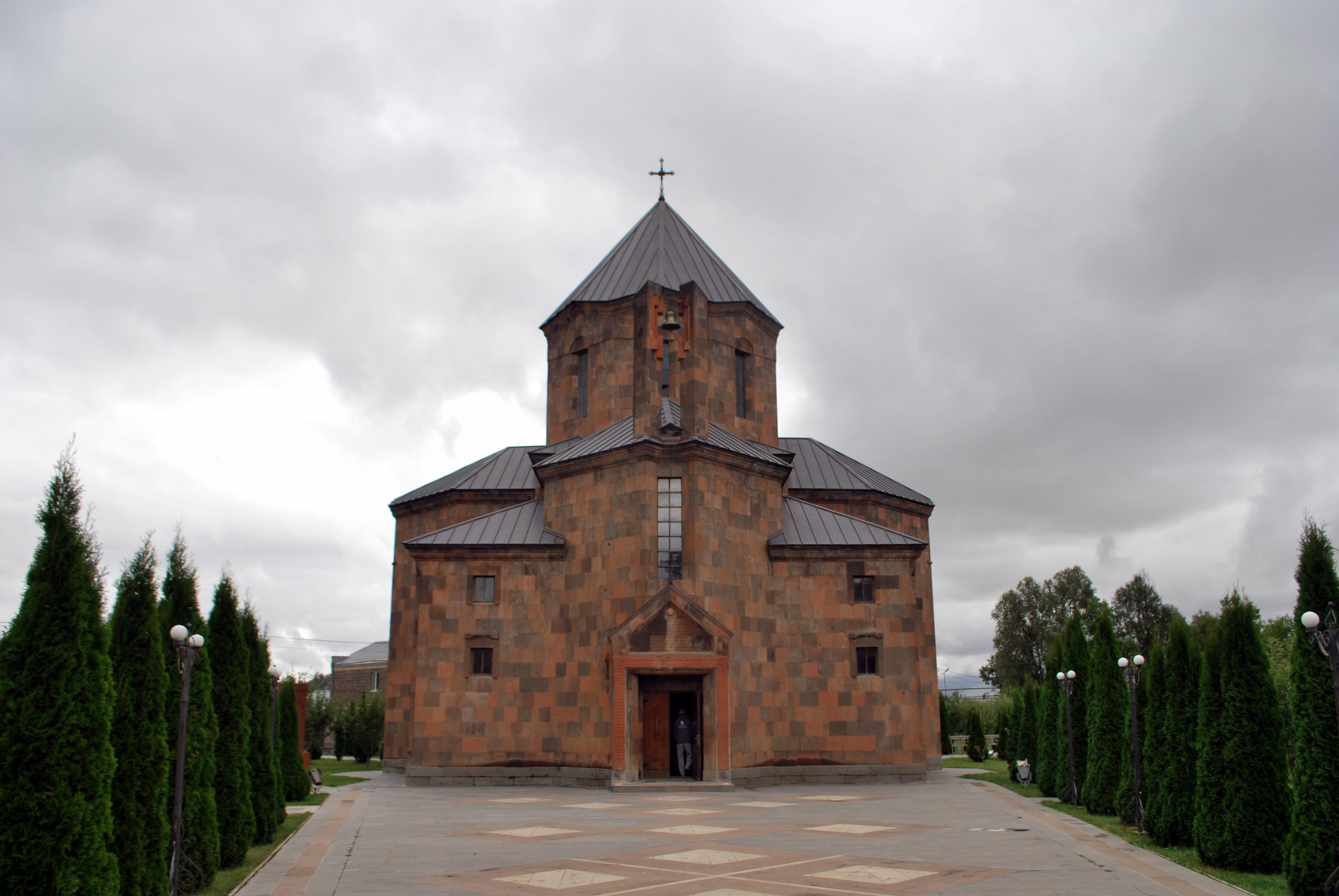
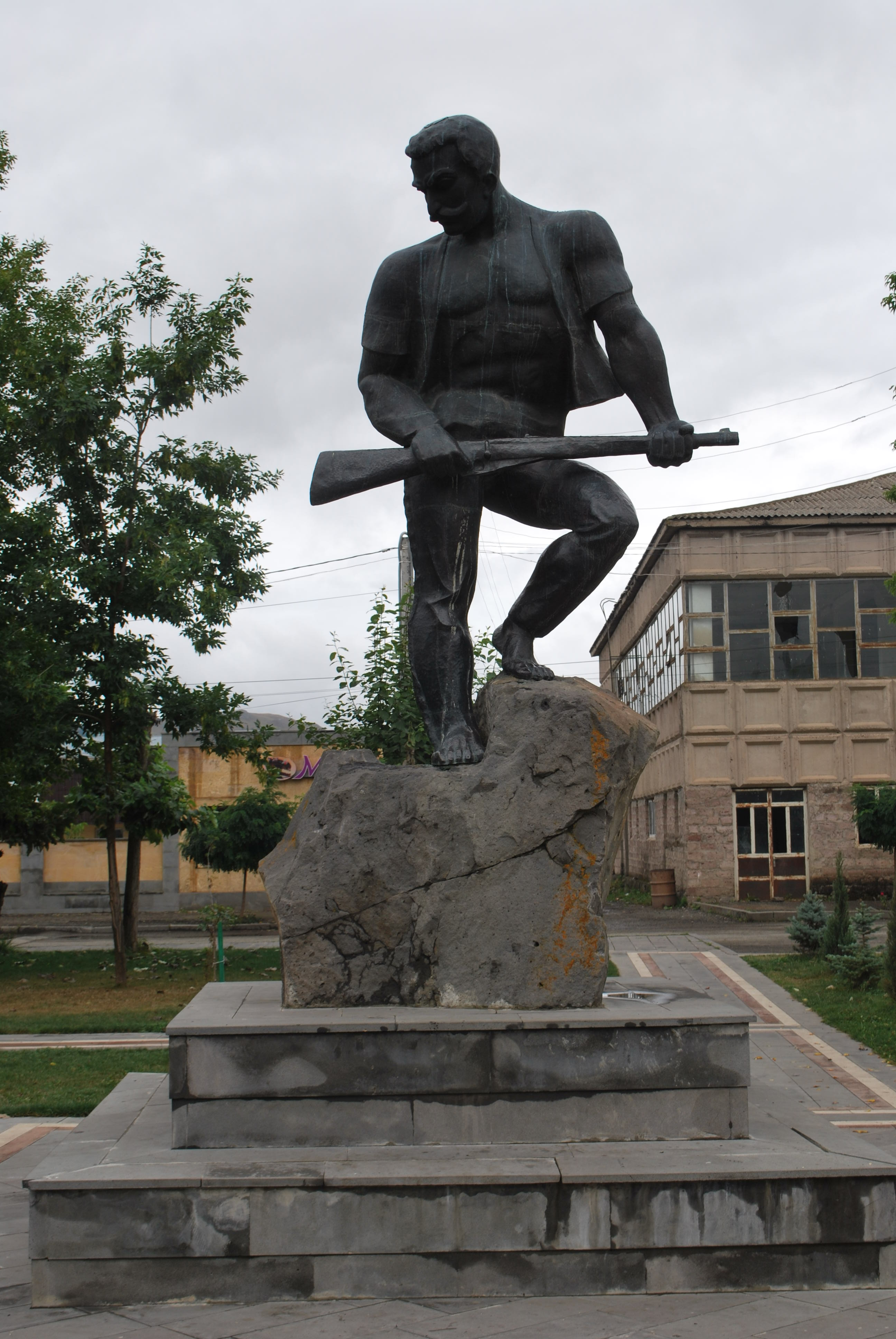
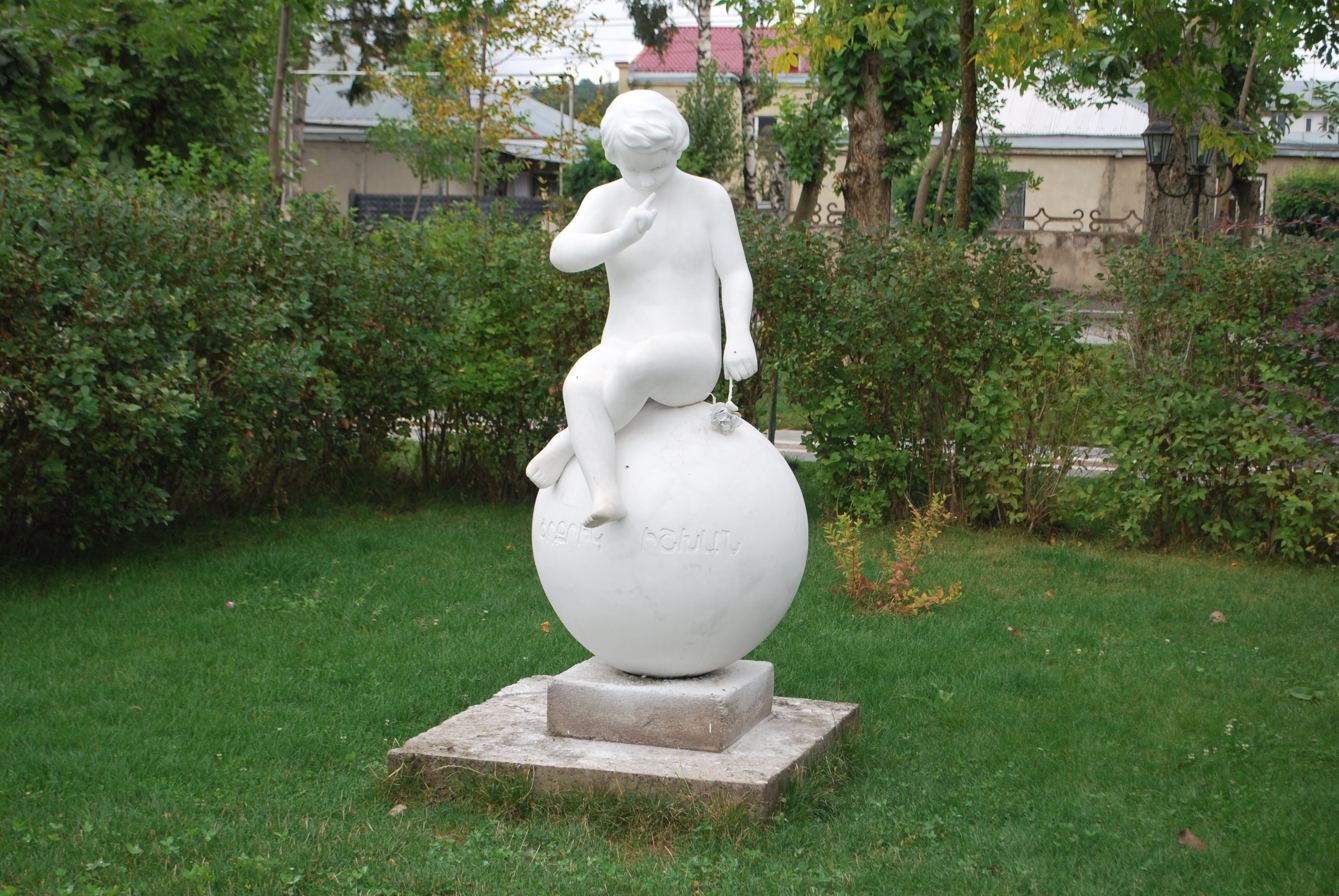
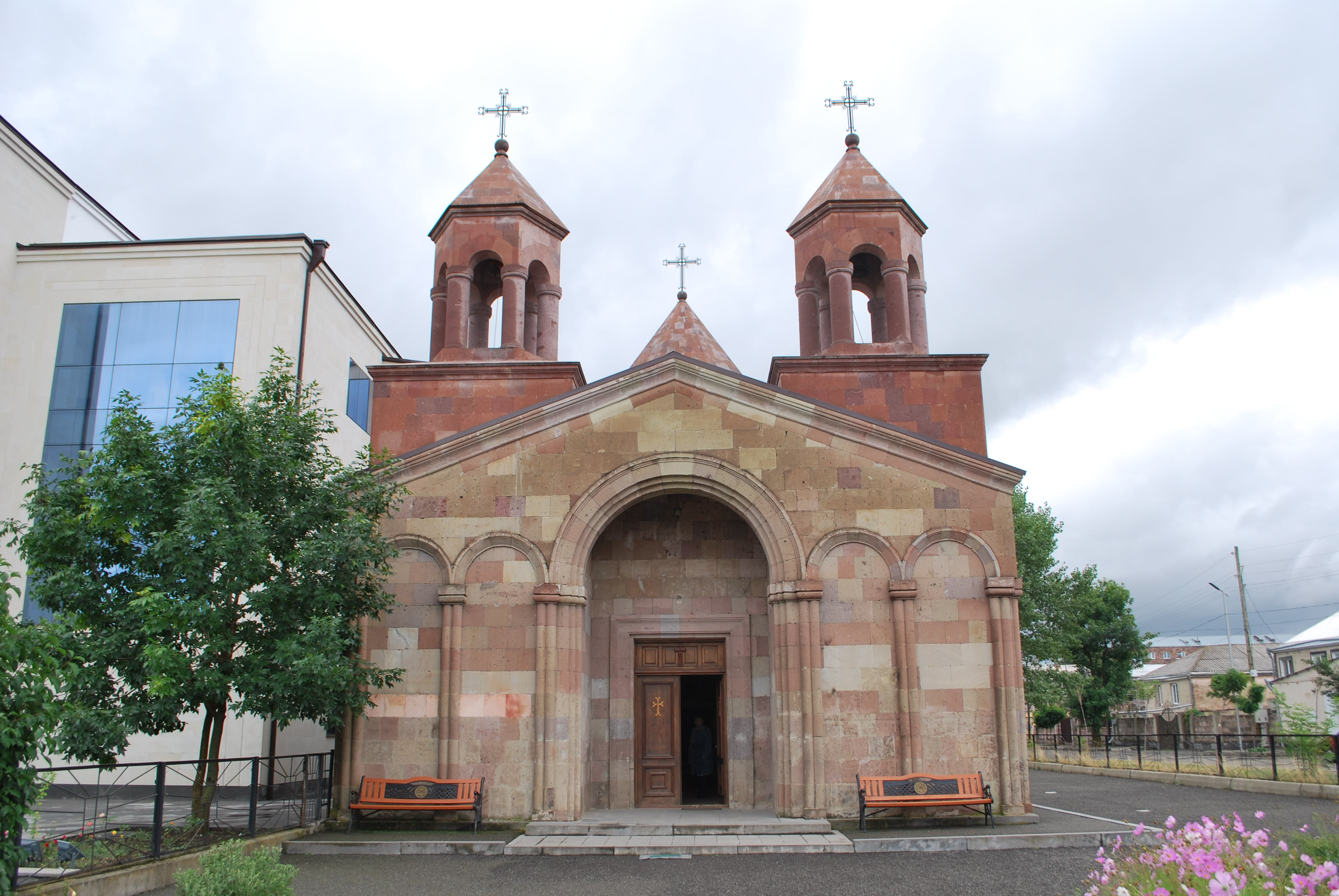

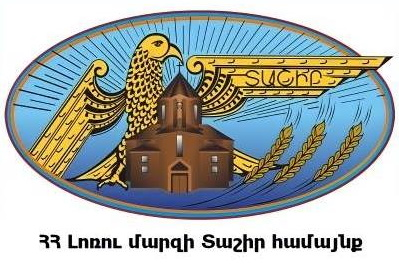
- Coat of arms

- Location within Armenia
- Coordinates: 41°07′28″N 44°16′55″E
- Country: Armenia
- Province: Lori
- Established: 1844

Area
  - Total: 5.6 km^{2} (2.2 sq mi)
- Elevation: 1,500 m (4,900 ft)

Population (2022)
  - Total: 7,424
  - Estimate (2023): 7,300
  - Density: 1,300/km^{2} (3,400/sq mi)
- Time zone: UTC+4 (AMT)
- Postal code: 2101

Tashir (Armenian: Տաշիր) is a town and urban municipal community located in Lori Province at the north of Armenia. It is located 42 km (26 mi) north of the provincial centre Vanadzor and 154 (96) north of the capital Yerevan. As per the January 2023 official estimate, the population of Tashir was around 7,300.

== Etymology ==
Tashir was first mentioned by the Armenian historian Movses Khorenatsi in his 5th-century monumental work History of Armenia as one of the cantons of the lords of Gugark.

== History ==
Historically, the area of modern-day Tashir was included in the Tashir canton of the historical Gugark province, the 13th province of Greater Armenia. With the Arab invasion of Armenia in 654, the region was granted to the Bagratid dynasty, who founded the Bagratid Kingdom of Armenia later in 885. It was the location of a major battle in 1040, part of the Shaddadid–Armenian wars.

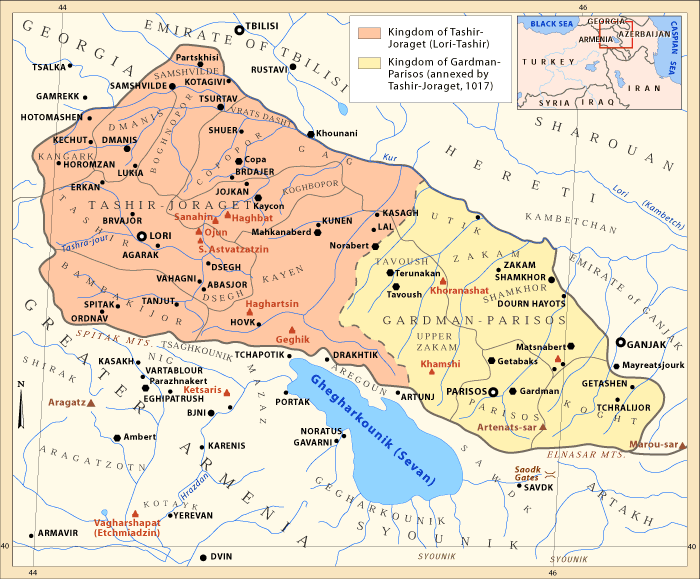
The Kingdom of Tashir-Dzoraget at the beginning of the 11th century

The region became a prominent centre of the Armenian culture and scholars under the rule of the Zakarid princes of Armenia. However, after the Mongols captured Ani in 1236, Zakarid Armenia turned into a Mongol protectorate as part of the Ilkhanate. After the fall of the Ilkhanate in the mid-14th century, the Zakarid princes controlled over Tashir until 1360 when they fell to the invading Turkic tribes.

After suffering from the invasion of Aq Qoyunlu, Kara Koyunlu, Ottomans and Persians from the 14th to 18th centuries, most of the territories in northern Armenia were annexed from Qajar Persia in favour of the Russian Empire In 1801. The region of Tashir became officially part of the Russian Empire at the Treaty of Gulistan signed on 24 October 1813 between Imperial Russia and Qajar Persia.

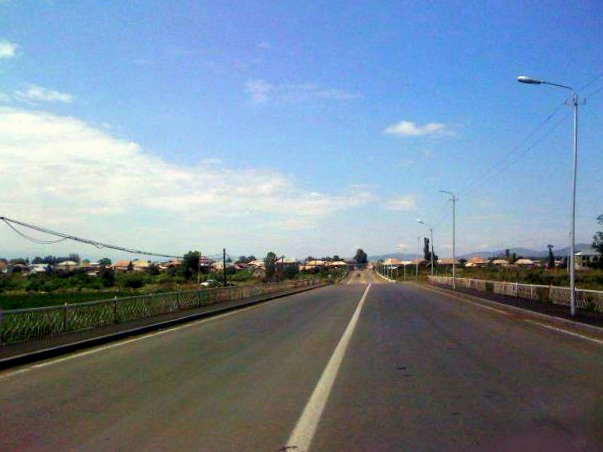
Tashir

The newly-established settlement was named Vorontsovka (Воронцовка) after the Viceroy of the Caucasus Mikhail Semyonovich Vorontsov. In 1846, it was included in the Borchaly uezd of the Tiflis Governorate.

In 1935, during the Soviet rule, the settlement was renamed Kalinino after the Russian Bolshevik revolutionary leader Mikhail Kalinin and was called. In 1961, Kalinino was granted the statues of an urban-type settlement to become the centre of Kalinino raion. In 1983, it was granted with the status of a town.

With the independence of Armenia in 1991, the town was renamed Tashir after the historic Tashir canton of Gugark, and was eventually included within the Lori Province formed as per the 1995 administrative reforms of independent Armenia.

== Geography ==
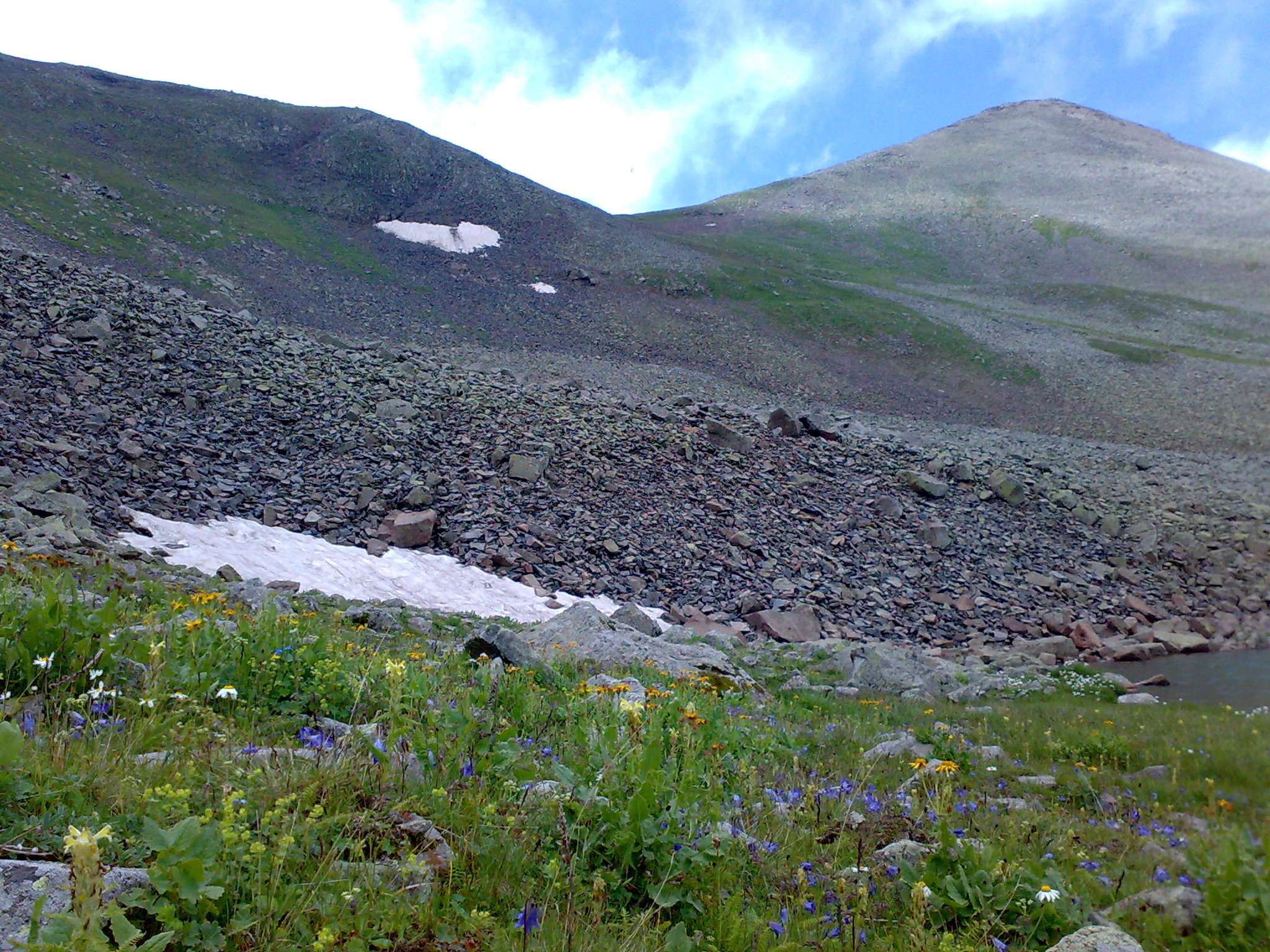
Mount Achkasar at the west of Tashir

Situated at the northern part of Lori plain, Tashir is located on the shores of Tashir river, at an elevation of 1500 meters above sea level. The town is surrounded with black prairies, alpine meadows and many marshes. The town is dominated by the Javakheti range of the Lesser Caucasus from the west. Mount Achkasar which is the highest point of the range with a height of 3,196 meters (10,486 ft), is located 25 km (16 mi) west of Tashir.

The town is characterized with a continental climate, with an average temperature of −4.3 °C (24.3 °F) in January, and 17 °C (63 °F) in July. The annual precipitation level is about 770 mm (30 in).

Climate data for Tashir (1991-2020)
Month	Jan	Feb	Mar	Apr	May	Jun	Jul	Aug	Sep	Oct	Nov	Dec	Year
Record high °C (°F)	15.0 (59.0)	15.4 (59.7)	23.3 (73.9)	25.7 (78.3)	27.4 (81.3)	29.8 (85.6)	34.6 (94.3)	32.7 (90.9)	29.7 (85.5)	27.5 (81.5)	22.0 (71.6)	19.1 (66.4)	34.6 (94.3)
Daily mean °C (°F)	−4.3 (24.3)	−3.4 (25.9)	1.1 (34.0)	6.1 (43.0)	10.6 (51.1)	14.5 (58.1)	17.0 (62.6)	17.0 (62.6)	13.0 (55.4)	8.3 (46.9)	2.0 (35.6)	−2.2 (28.0)	6.6 (44.0)
Record low °C (°F)	−33.6 (−28.5)	−30.8 (−23.4)	−23.8 (−10.8)	−16.0 (3.2)	−6.4 (20.5)	−2.4 (27.7)	0.1 (32.2)	−0.4 (31.3)	−6.5 (20.3)	−10.5 (13.1)	−25.8 (−14.4)	−27.8 (−18.0)	−33.6 (−28.5)
Average precipitation mm (inches)	24.4 (0.96)	26.6 (1.05)	45.9 (1.81)	88.0 (3.46)	128.4 (5.06)	146.6 (5.77)	85.2 (3.35)	62.7 (2.47)	57.8 (2.28)	50.6 (1.99)	32.1 (1.26)	20.4 (0.80)	768.7 (30.26)
Average precipitation days (≥ 1 mm)	4.5	5.1	7.7	11.9	16.3	14.6	10.5	8.5	8.1	8.2	4.8	3.6	103.8
Average relative humidity (%)	73.7	74.8	73.9	74.7	74.9	75.7	75	73.3	75.3	77	76.1	74	74.9
Source: NOAA

== Demographics ==
Historical population
Year	Pop.	±% p.a.
1886	2,284	—
1897	3,076	+2.74%
1926	4,042	+0.95%
1939	4,245	+0.38%
1959	4,766	+0.58%
2001	9,538	+1.67%
2011	7,773	−2.03%
2022	7,424	−0.42%

Currently, the majority of the population in Tashir are ethnic Armenians who belong to the Armenian Apostolic Church, regulated by the Diocese of Gougark, based in Vanadzor. The town's Surp Sarkis Armenian Apostolic church was built between 1995 and 2000 through donations from businessman Samvel Karapetyan and his brother Karen. There is also a tiny community of members of the Armenian Catholic Church.

The healthcare is served through the Tashir Medical Center.

== Culture ==
The area of modern-day Tashir was probably settled during the early Bronze Age. A cyclopean fortress, as well as an ancient cemetery dating back to the 3rd and 2nd millennium BC respectively are found near the town. The remains of a 10th-century church are also visible in the town.

Nowadays, Tashir is home to a cultural center, 3 public libraries, as well as a music school.

== Transportation ==
Tashir is located on the M-3 Motorway that connects on Yerevan with Tbilisi. The town is also connected with eastern and western Armenia through the H-31 Road.

The Stepanavan Airport which is located 8 km (5 mi) southeast of Tashir on the halfway to Stepanavan, is currently under renovation and expected to be ready during 2018.

== Economy ==
The majority of the residents of Tashir are involved in industry, mainly the production of canned food and dairy. The town is home to a Swiss cheese factory that produces the cheeses Lori and Chanakh. It was one of the largest plants for dairy products in the Soviet Union.

However, the majority of the inhabitants are employed in agriculture. 32% of the lands are privatized, 71% of which are arable lands and 29% of which are pastures. Half of the state importance lands is 1,660 ha (4,100 acres). The lands are also used as arable farms and meadows, which cover 951 and 581 hectares (2,350 and 1,440 acres), respectively. Other agricultural products and activities include grain, melons and gourds, potatoes and fruits, cattle-breeding, pig-breeding, poultry farming and bee-keeping.

Currently, the town is mainly suffering from its outdated network of regional roads, the sewage system and the water supply network.

== Education ==
Tashir has 3 public education schools as well as many kindergartens. In 2015, the number of the students in the town reached up to 1186.

However, among the main problems of the community are the outdated school buildings and complexes.

== Sport ==
There are two sport schools in the town mainly dedicated to individual sports including wrestling, weightlifting, martial arts and chess. There is also a regular-sized football training filed in the town.

As of 2015, the number of children attending the sport schools is around 120 children.

== Notable people ==
- Samvel Karapetyan, Armenian-born Russian businessman and owner of Tashir Group
- Amar Suloev, was an Armenian mixed martial artist.
