= Pambak =

Pambak or P’ambak may refer to:

- Pambak, Gegharkunik, Armenia
- Pambak, Lori, Armenia
- Sipan, Armenia, formerly Pambak
- Pambak (river), in northern Armenia
- Pambak mountains, a mountain range of Armenia
