= Khor Khor =

Khor Khor (Persian: خرخر) may refer to:

- Khor Khor, East Azerbaijan
- Khor Khor, Kermanshah
