= Alages =

Alages may refer to:

- Aragats, Talin, town in Armenia
- Dar-Alages, volcano in Armenia
