= Pyrus gergerana =

Conservation status
- Critically Endangered (IUCN 3.1)

Scientific classification
- Kingdom: Plantae
- Clade: Tracheophytes
- Clade: Angiosperms
- Clade: Eudicots
- Clade: Rosids
- Order: Rosales
- Family: Rosaceae
- Genus: Pyrus
- Species: P. gergerana

Binomial name
- Pyrus gergerana Valentina Gladkova

Species of flowering plant

Pyrus gergerana, known as the Gergeranian pear, is a species of tree in the family Rosaceae. It is a wild pear endemic to Armenia, found only near the village of Herher (Ger-Ger) in the southeastern part of the country. There are estimated to be a mere 50 trees left in the wild, yet, as of 2014, there have been no conservation measures in place to protect the species.

== Description ==
Pyrus gergerana differs from other species by form and shape of leaves and fruits. It blooms from April to June, and the fruit ripens in September. Fruits are large (3-3.5 cm in diameter).
