= Tskhouk-Karckar =

Volcanic cones on the border of Armenia and Azerbaijan

- Qarqar
- Location within Caucasus Mountains Location within Armenia Location within Azerbaijan

Highest point
- Elevation: 3,139 m (10,299 ft)
- Listing: Volcanoes in Armenia; Volcanoes in Azerbaijan
- Coordinates: 39°44′31″N 45°59′31″E

Geography
- Countries: Armenia; Azerbaijan

Geology
- Mountain type: Pyroclastic cones
- Volcanic zone: Siunik volcanic ridge
- Last eruption: 3000 BCE ± 300 years

Tskhouk-Karckar or Qarqar is a group of pyroclastic cones which is located in the central part of the Siunik volcanic ridge at the border of Armenia and Azerbaijan 60 km (37 mi) SE of Lake Sevan. The volcanoes lie on the northwest side of Tskhouk volcano and are constructed on a volcanic basement or rhyolites, basaltic andesites and dacites. The volcanoes erupted voluminous and long lava flows, grouped in three age-based stages of varying age and conservation. Petroglyphs have been found buried under the most recent stages and broken by earthquake activity, suggesting activity between the 4th–early 3rd millennium BC and 4720 ± 140 years BP, a date established by C14 analysis on graves inside the lava flows. There is evidence indicating that the last stage of activity resulted in abandonment of the area by humans, only resuming during the Middle Ages.
