= Mount Leyli =

Mountain in Georgia and Armenia

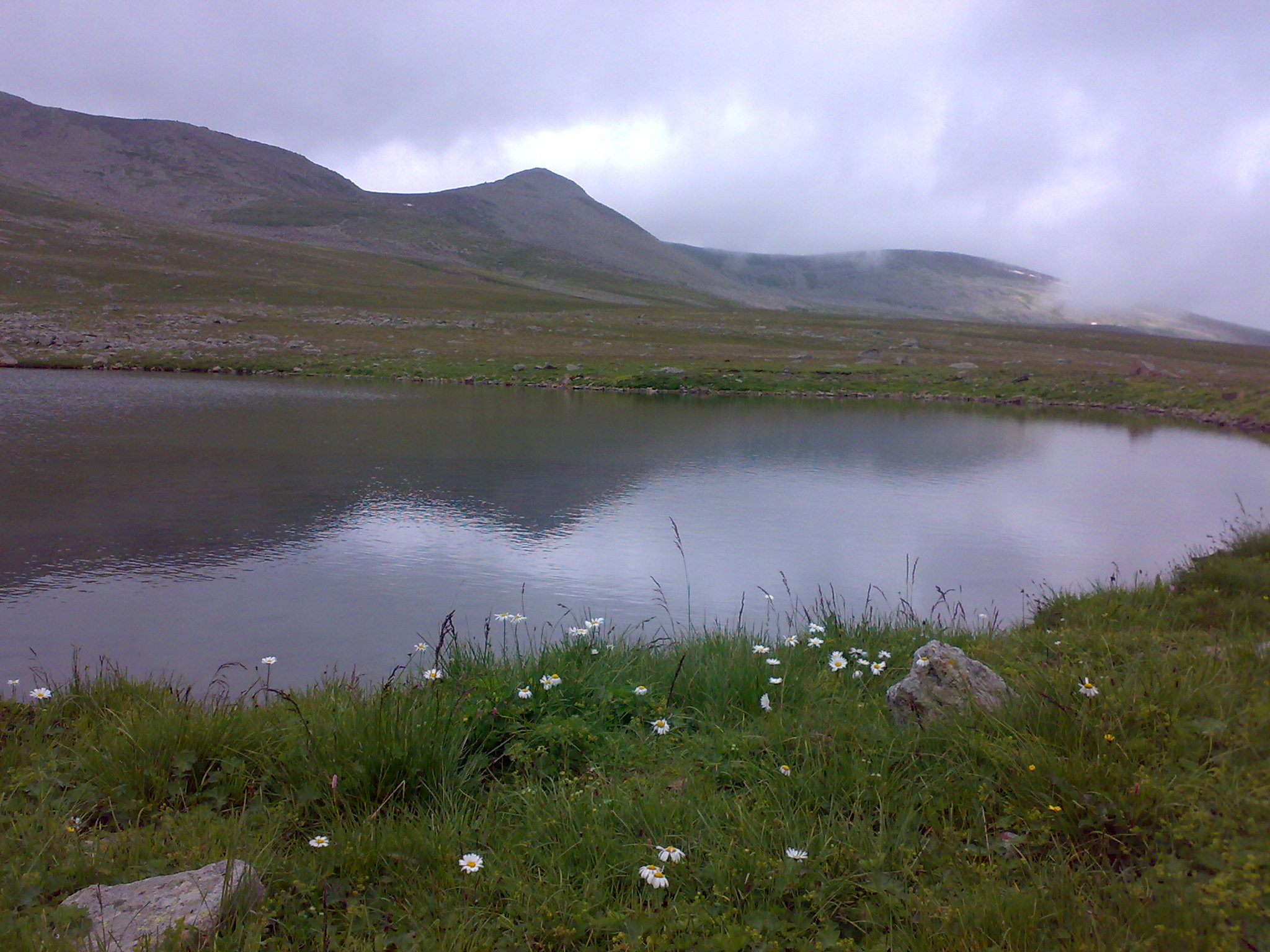
- Mount Leyli

Highest point
- Elevation: 3,157 m (10,358 ft)
- Coordinates: 41°09′56″N 43°57′15″E

Geography
- Location within Samtskhe-Javakheti Location within Georgia
- Location: Samtskhe–Javakheti, Kvemo Kartli, Georgia / Armenia, Shirak Province, Lori Province
- Countries: Georgia and Armenia
- Parent range: Javakheti

Geology
- Rock age: Quaternary

Mount Leyli, also Leili (Georgian: ლეილი) is a 3,157 m (10,358 ft) Mountain lies on the border of Samtskhe–Javakheti, Kvemo Kartli (Georgia) and Shirak Province, Lori Province (Armenia). Leyli is the second highest peak of the Javakheti Range in the Lesser Caucasus Mountains.

== See also ==
- List of volcanoes in Georgia (country)
- Javakheti Range
- Mount Aghchala
- Mount Yemlikli

== Image gallery ==
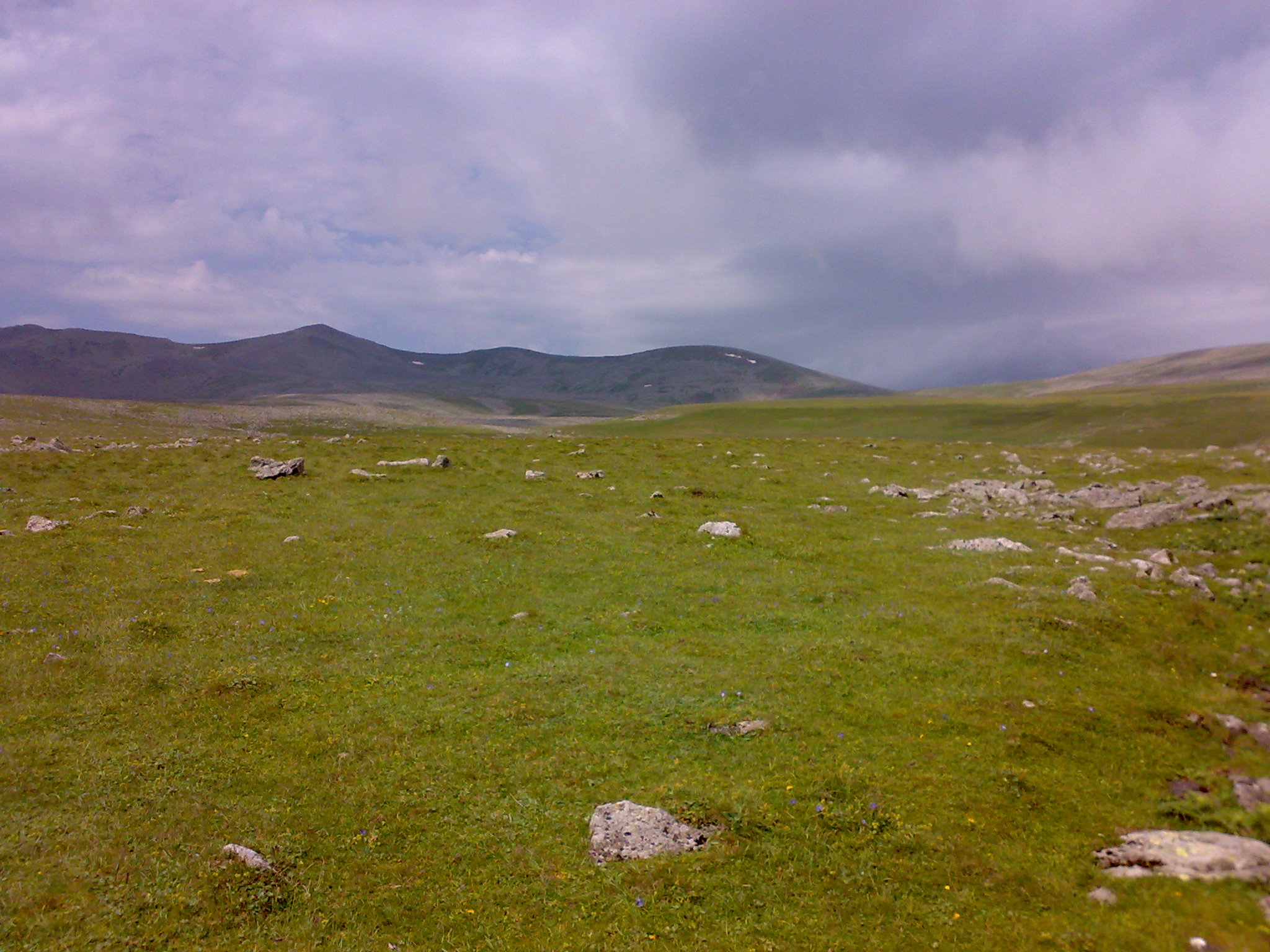

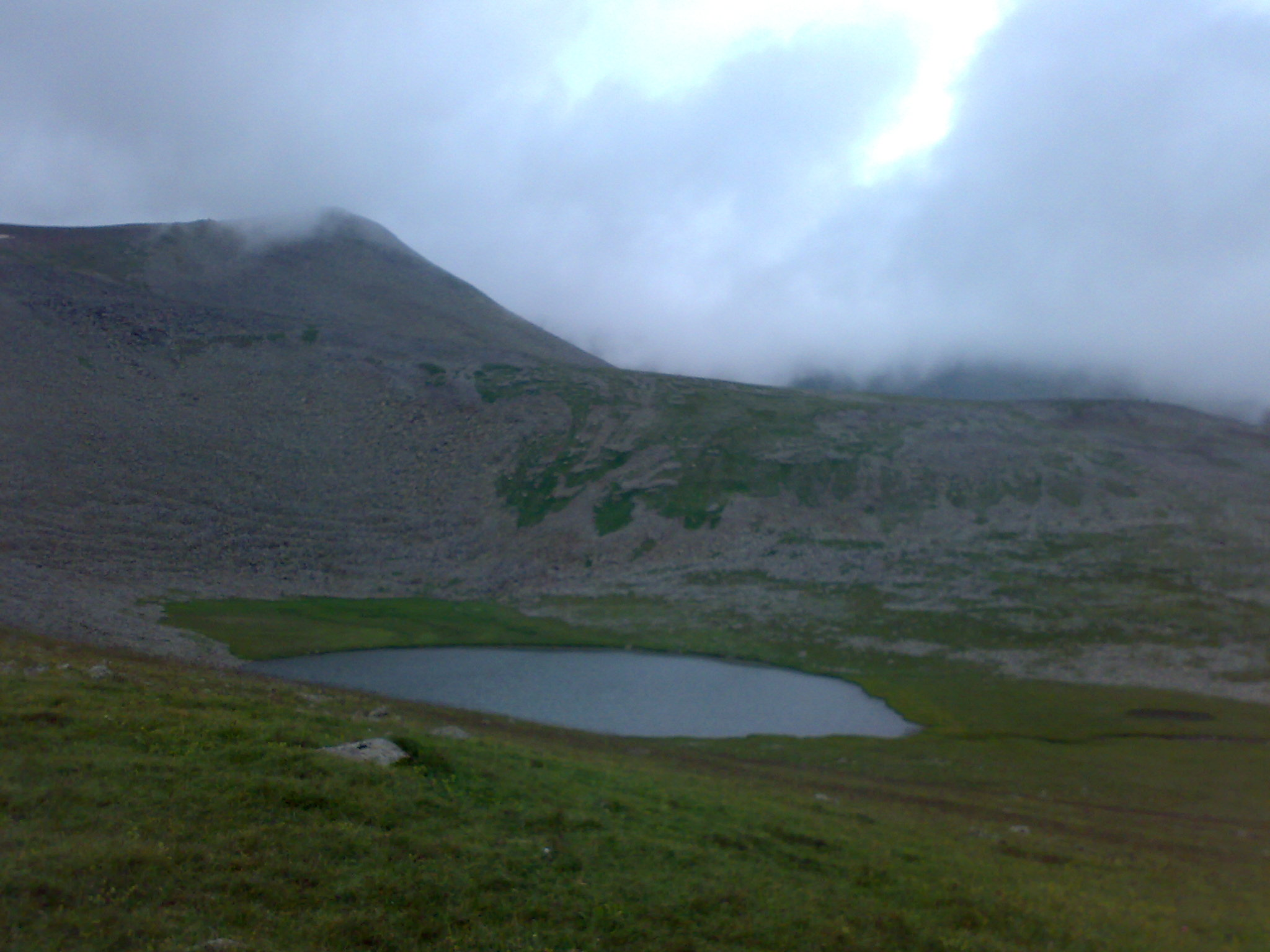
