= Tashir (historical region) =

Ancient Armenian historical region in the South Caucasus

Tashir or Taschir (Armenian: Տաշիր) is an ancient Armenian historical region in the South Caucasus, which is divided between modern Armenia and Georgia since the 11th century, and still divided between the two countries, in the Armenian Lori Province and the Georgian region of Kvemo Kartli(Somhetia).

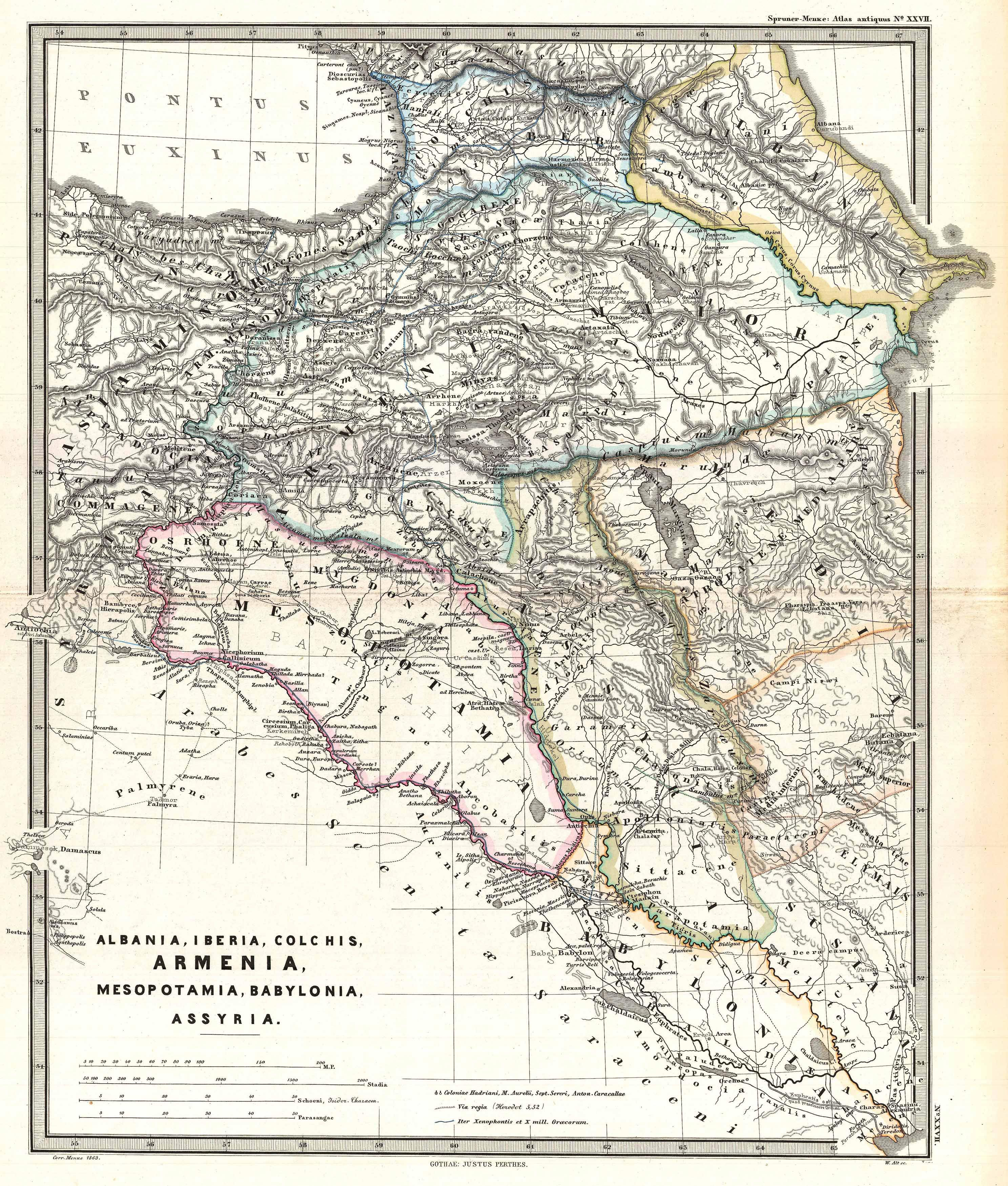
Taschir(Thasia) historic region of Greater Armenia

The name of Tashir of Armenian origin, (known as Tashiri in neighboring Georgia) this word known since classical antiquity, referring to the plateau between the Debed and Pambak rivers. It was first mentioned by the Armenian historian Movses Khorenatsi in his 5th-century monumental work History of Armenia, as one of the cantons of the lords of Gugark, a former province of Greater Armenia, which had become part of the Kingdom of Caucasian Iberia in the 5th century and again part of kingdom of Georgia in 1118. Tashir was a part of Greater Armenia since 6th century BC to 5th century AD. After this, both Armenian and Iberian lords already had pretension over the land of Tashir, and it passed hands following the political fortunes of each. Tashir historically was a territory with Armenian majority.

In the following centuries, the area was ruled mostly by Armenian lords. When the Bagratid Kingdom of Armenia fell apart in the 10th century, the region was the basis of the Kingdom of Lori, or Kingdom of Tashir-Dzoraget (978-1118). It was conquered at the beginning of the 12th century by David IV of Georgia. It was a part of Georgia until the Mongol invasions devastated it and weakened the Georgian state. From then on, the region suffered many other invasions, lost much of its population and importance. It belonged to the domains of the noble Armenian Orbelian and was part of the Persian Empire until the Russian conquest of the Caucasus. The name of Tashir declined in use, and was replaced by that of Lori.

Between 1918 and 1921, the region was again disputed between the newly independent states of Georgia and Armenia.

The town of Tashir (Armenia) is named after the historical region.

== Notable people ==
- Vren of Tashir (5th-century), ruler
