= Armenian Mountaineering and Hiking Federation =

Sporting Organization

Armenian Mountaineering and Hiking Federation logo

The Armenian Mountaineering and Hiking Federation (Armenian: Հայաստանի լեռնագնացության և արշավների ֆեդերացիա, romanized: Hayastani lerrnagnats’ut’yan yev arshavneri federats’ia), also known as the Armenian Federation of Alpinism and Mountain Tourism, is the regulating body of mountaineering, hiking, and climbing in Armenia. The headquarters of the federation is located in Yerevan.

== History ==
The Armenian Mountaineering and Hiking Federation was founded in February 2011 and Suren Danielyan serves as the current president of the federation. Armenian mountain climbers have competed in mountaineering competitions organized by the International Climbing and Mountaineering Federation. The federation seeks to promote mountain climbing in Armenia and organizes trainings, seminars, and conferences with mountaineers within Armenia and internationally. The federation conducts a theoretical and practical training program twice annually. Members of the federation have climbed mountains including Mount Ararat, Mount Damavand, Mount Elbrus, and Mount Kazbek.

The federation organizes annual Mountain Day celebrations on 9 October.

In 2016, the federation supported the formation of the "4 peaks mountain club", a children's and youth mountaineering club. The youth club focuses on teaching basic skills, including survival skills.

The federation also campaigns for protecting the natural environment of Armenia. In July 2022, an initiative was proposed to install a statue of Jesus Christ atop Mount Hatis. The Federation actively opposed the creation of the statue and called on the government of Armenia to protect the mountain. The federation submitted a joint statement together with ten Armenian hiking clubs opposing the statue to representatives of the Armenian Apostolic Church.

In January 2022, the federation created an artificial rock climbing wall for a school in Stepanakert, Artsakh.

== See also ==
- List of alpine clubs
- Mountains of Armenia
- Sport in Armenia
