= Mount Yemlikli =

Mountain near Saghamo, Georgia

Yemlikli ემლიქლი
- Location within Samtskhe-Javakheti Location within Georgia

Highest point
- Elevation: 3,054 m (10,020 ft)
- Coordinates: 41°15′40″N 43°55′28″E

Geography
- Location: Georgia
- Parent range: Javakheti Range

Geology
- Rock age: Quaternary

Mount Yemlikli, also Emlikli, Emlik'li (Georgian: ემლიქლი) is a 3,054 m (10,020 ft) tall mountain near Saghamo (village in Georgia) and between the Georgian provinces of Samtskhe-Javakheti and Kvemo Kartli. Yemlikli is one of the high peaks of the Lesser Caucasus Mountains and is in the Javakheti Range.

== See also ==
- Javakheti Range
- Javakheti Plateau
- Mount Aghchala
- Mount Leyli
