= List of volcanoes in Azerbaijan =

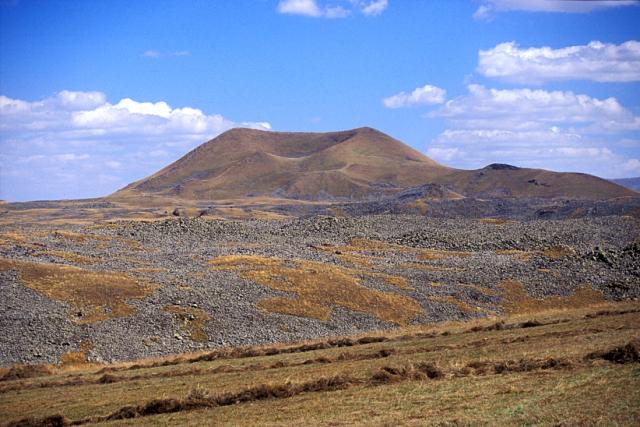
Axarbaxar volcano

This is a list of active and extinct volcanoes in Azerbaijan.

Name	Elevation		Location	Last eruption
Name	meters	feet	Coordinates	Last eruption
Böyük İşıqlı	3,552	11,653	39.58°N 46.17°E	Unknown
Axarbaxar	2,800	9,186	40.02°N 45.78°E	778 BC
Qarqar	3,000	9,842	39.73°N 46.02°E	3000 BC
