= Vren of Tashir =

Vren of Tashir ruled Tashir in the fifth century. The History of Vardan by Yeghishe Vardapet records him as having led a contingent to the battle of Avarayr in 451.
