= List of volcanoes in Armenia =

This is a list of volcanoes in Armenia.

Name	Elevation		Location	Last known eruption	Ref.
Name	meters	feet	Location	Last known eruption	Ref.
Mount Aragats	4,095	13,432	40.53°N 44.2°E	Unknown	
Ghegam Ridge	3,597	11,798	40.275°N 44.75°E	1900 BCE ± 750 years	
Mets Ishkhanasar	3,552	11,653	39.58°N 46.17°E	Unknown	
Porak	3,029	9,935	40.028°N 45.74°E	778 BCE ± 5 years	
Tskhouk-Karckar	3,000	9,840	39.73°N 46.02°E	3000 BCE ± 300 years	
Mount Vayotssar	2,581	8,468	39.85°N 45.40°E	~40,000 years	
Arailer	2,577	8,454	40.24°N 44.27°E	Unknown	
Arteni	2,047	6,715	40°17′54″N 43°45′15″E	Unknown	
Dar-Alages	1,637	5,369	39.704°N 45.551°E	2000 BCE (?) ± 1000 years	

== Gallery ==
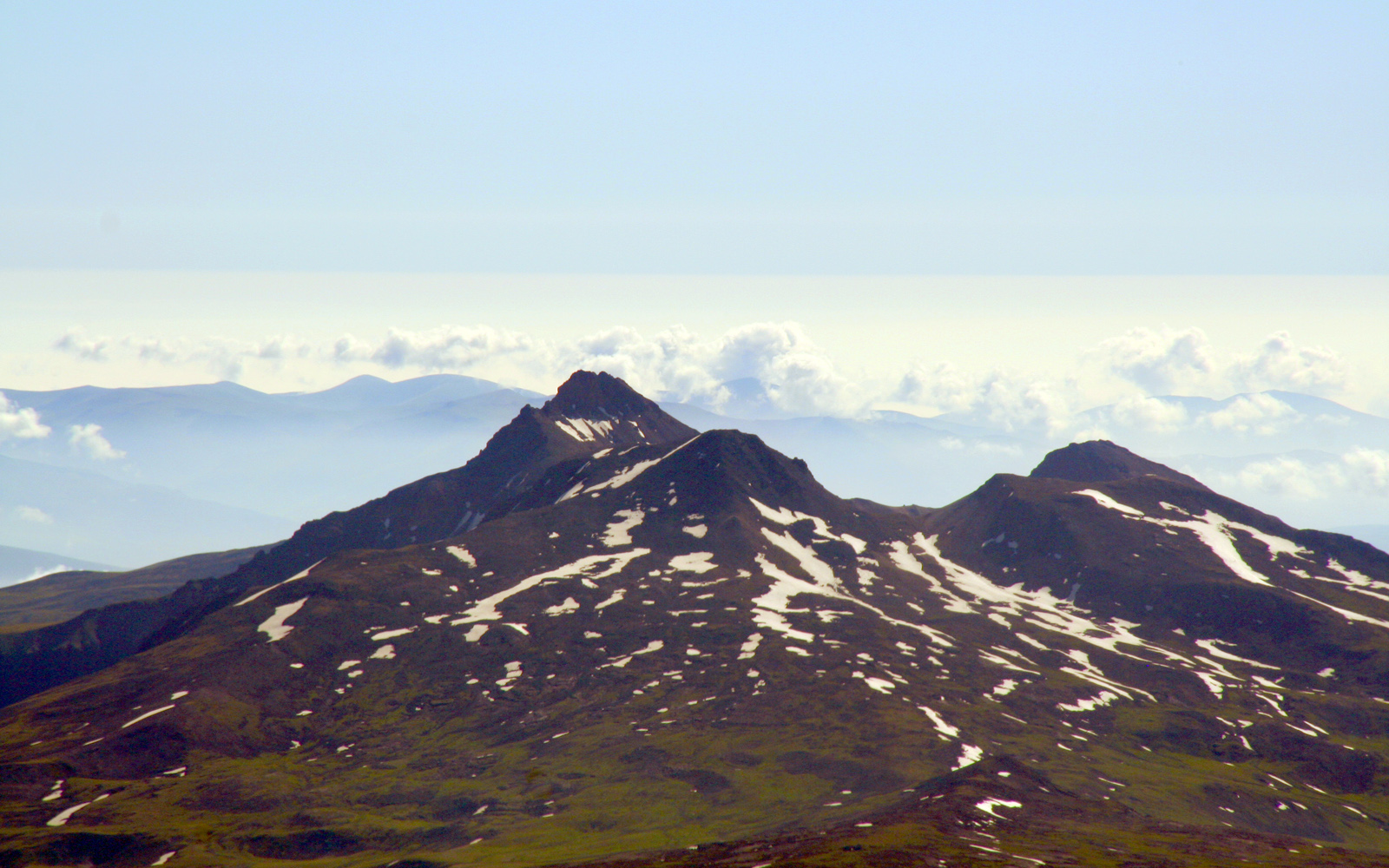
Mount Aragats

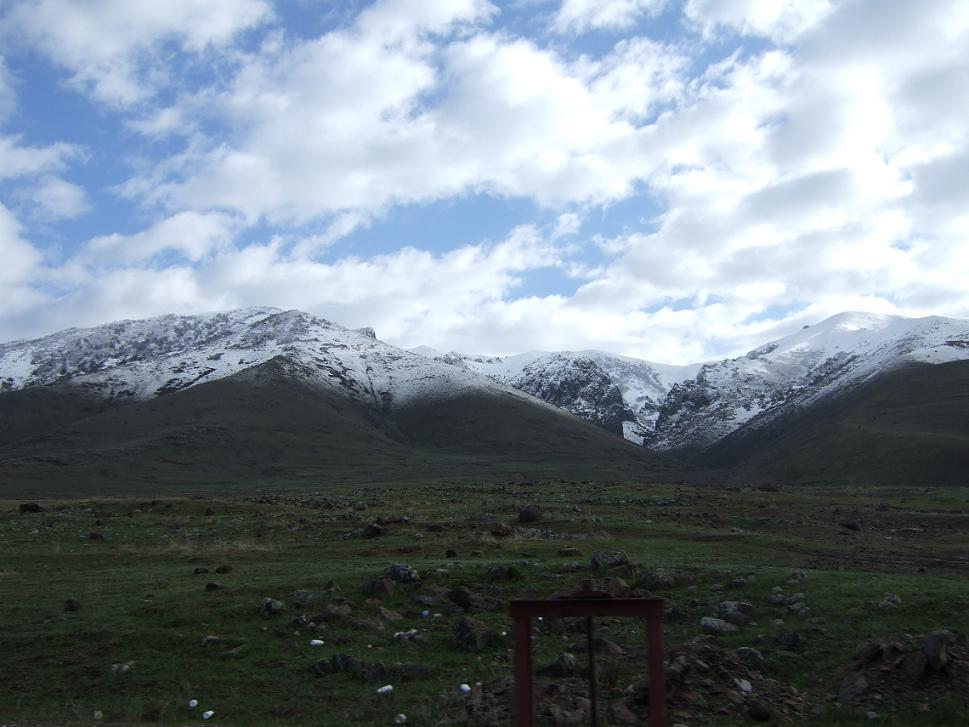
Arailer

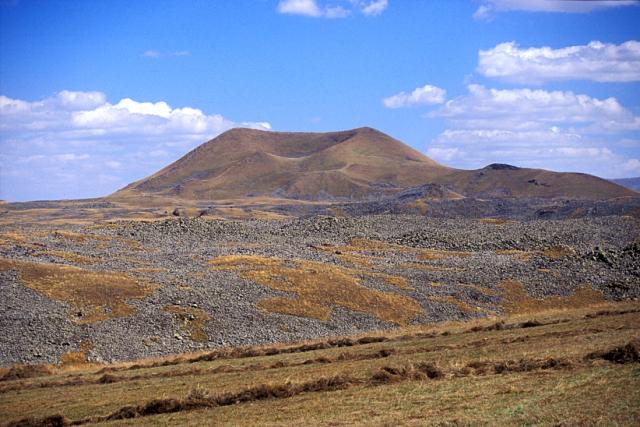
Porak

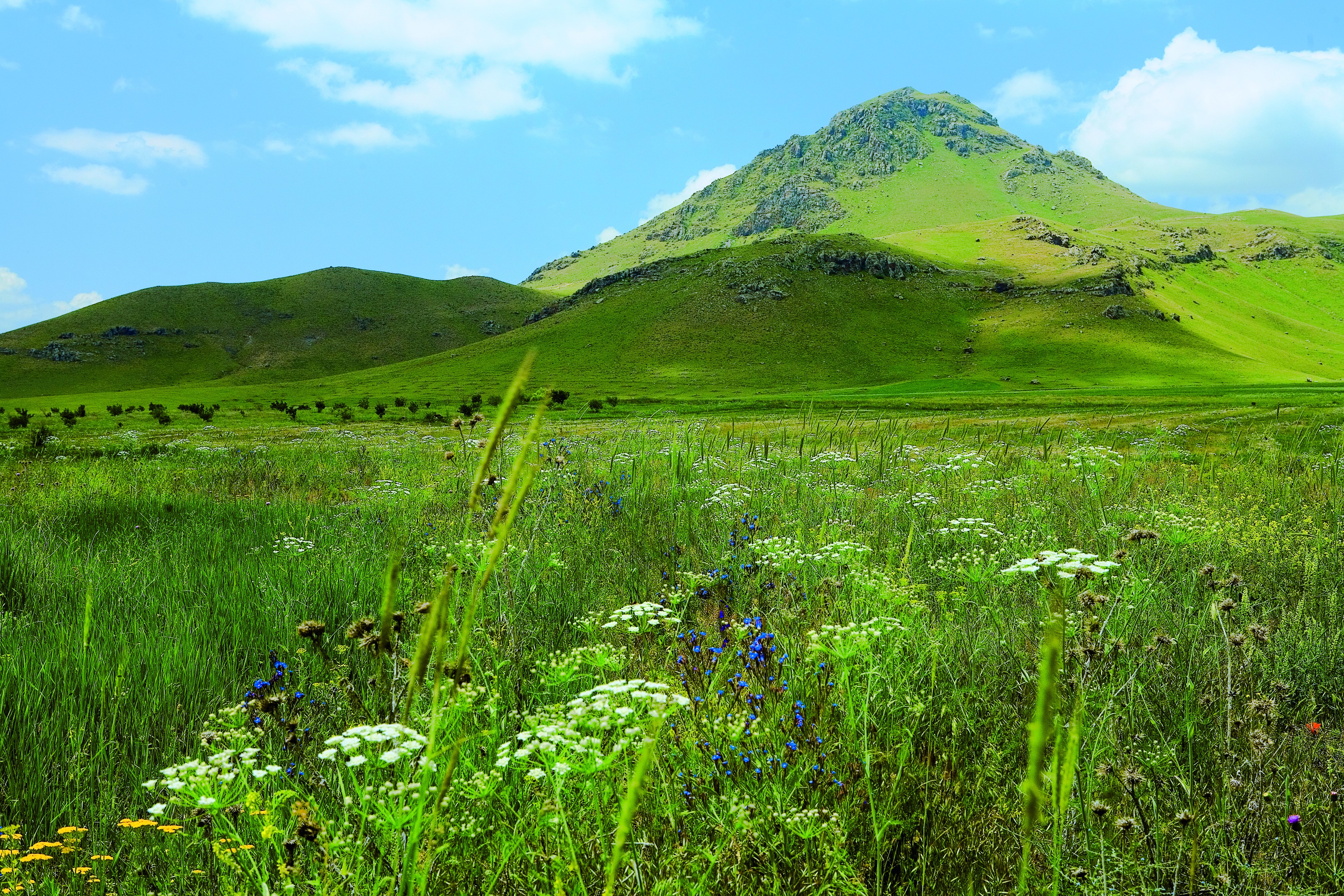
Arteni

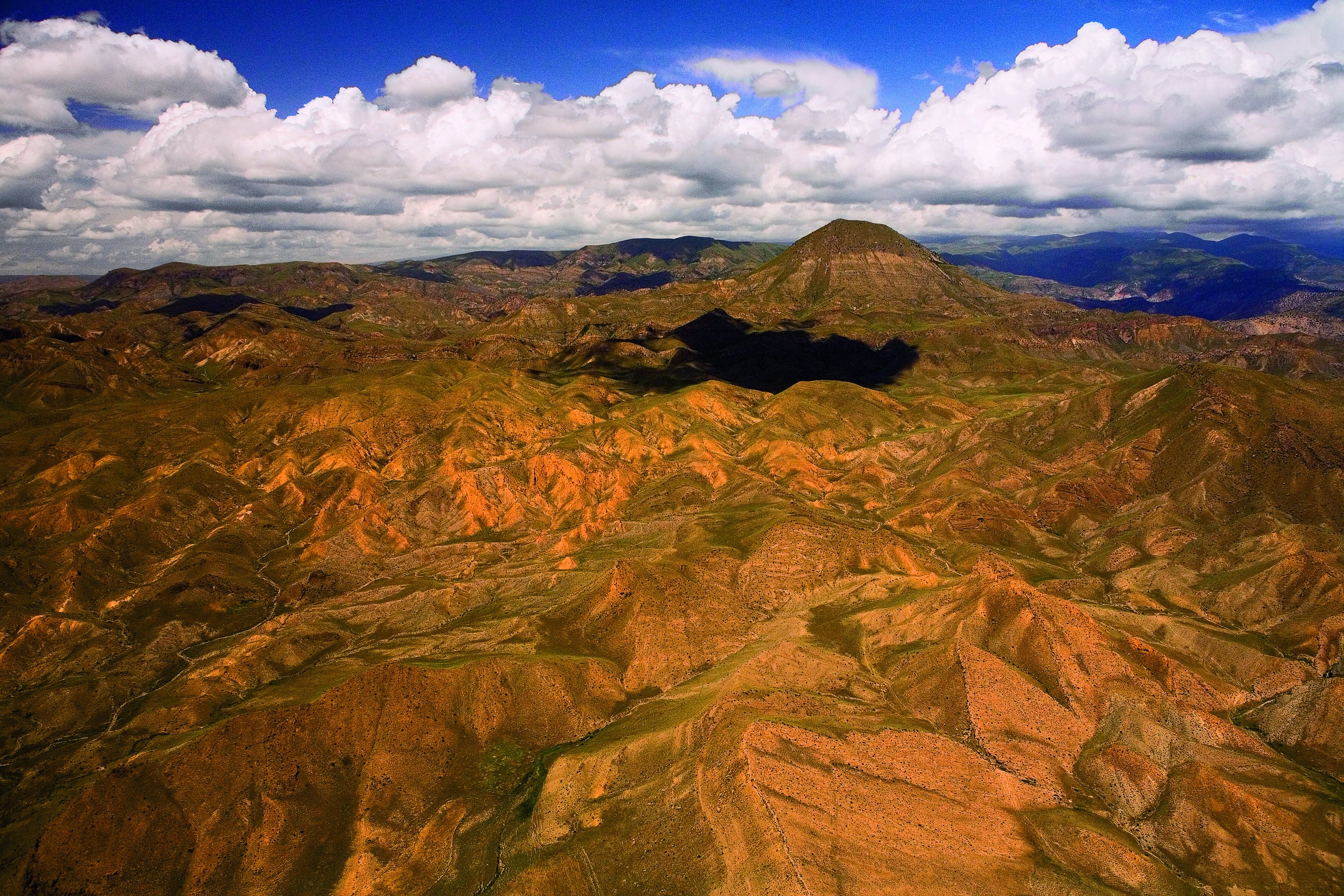
Ghegam Ridge

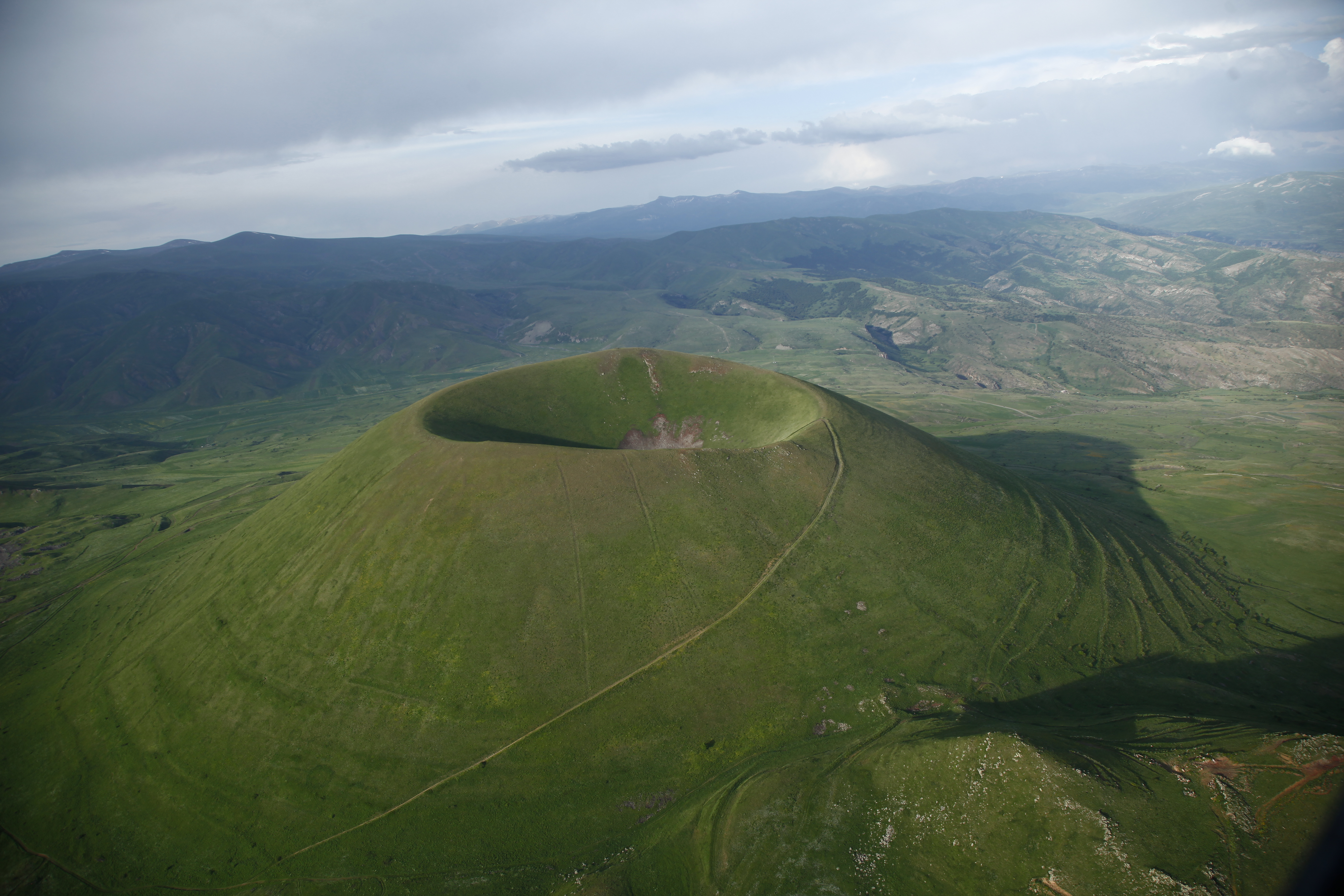
Mount Vayotssar
