= Porak =

Volcano on the border between Armenia and Azerbaijan

- Axarbaxar
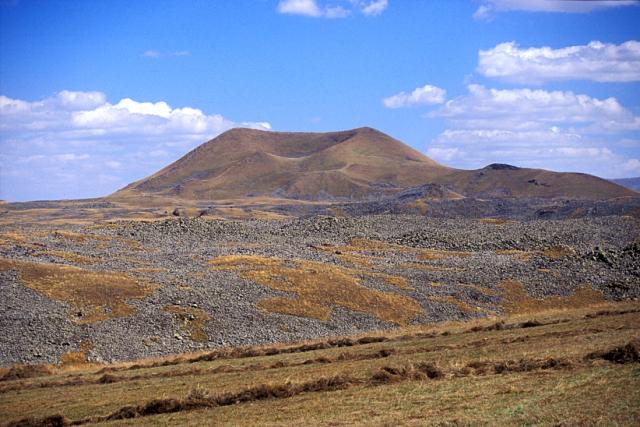
- A pyroclastic cone of the Porak volcanic field.

Highest point
- Elevation: 2,800 m (9,200 ft)
- Listing: Volcanoes in Armenia; Volcanoes in Azerbaijan
- Coordinates: 40°01′N 45°47′E

Geography
- Location within Armenia Location within Azerbaijan
- Countries: Armenia; Azerbaijan
- Parent range: Vardenis

Geology
- Mountain type: Stratovolcano
- Last eruption: 778 BCE ± 5 years

Porak or Akharbakhar ("gutted belly" in Azerbaijani) is a stratovolcano located in the Vardenis volcanic ridge. It lies about 20 km (12 mi) southeast of Lake Sevan and the volcanic field spans the border between Armenia and Azerbaijan with lava flows running into both countries. Ten satellite cones and fissure vents lie on the flanks of the volcano.

The Porak volcano itself and the third stage has been dated 15 ± 15 ka by K-Ar dating. Two long lava flows, one of which 21 km long, stretch from the field north and northeastwards. There are thermal springs in the area, and the Middle Pleistocene Khonarassar fault area lies to the north of the Porak centre. The Karkar volcanoes are situated in the same region. The complex is built on partly sedimentary rock and partly volcanogenic Late Cretaceous and Eocene series with Paleogene intrusions.

== Description ==
There are four stages of trachyandesitic lava flows, the oldest composing the Porak volcano itself and the younger three derived from cones and fissures. Two lava flows overlay Sevan Lake deposits with thin soil cover form an early Holocene stage. The second stage forms lava flows entering Lake Alaghel and is devoid of soil cover.

Several archaeological sites (one of these dated by radiocarbon analysis on charcoal to be no younger than 3080±40 BP-3200±40 BP) are constructed on the two oldest Holocene stages but not on the most recent stage. Third-stage lava flows run at the edge of one of these sites which was constructed on lavas from the previous two stages, suggesting that the site was affected by historical volcanic activity. There is also evidence of strong earthquake activity 6640±90 BP and between 782 and 773 BC. The volcano may have potential for geothermal power generation but is also a potential threat to several villages in the area.

== Khorkhor inscription ==
The Khorkhor inscription, in which Argishti I of Urartu records the conquest of the city of Behoura, records that during the siege the town was destroyed by an earthquake and eruption of "Mount Bamni". Historians consider it likely that Porak volcano is Mount Bamni and that Behoura was one of the archeological sites in the area. The location of Behoura is controversial, however. The identification of another inscription by Argishti's successor, Sarduri II, gives evidence of another eruption of Porak.

Older evidence of volcanic activity, including lacustrine deposits, indicate temporary disappearance of forests in the area before 6,270BP, likely due to forest fires induced by volcanic activity. Petroglyphs dated about 5,000BP also portray volcanic activity, together with even older portrayals of volcanic eruptions in Chauvet Cave (France) and in Çatalhöyük (Turkey) they are among the oldest records of volcanic activity in the world (these other portrayals related to the Bas-Vivarais volcanic field in the Massif Central and to Hasan Dagi, respectively). It is not entirely clear which eruption is depicted by the Porak petroglyphs.
