= Herher =

Herher Հերհեր
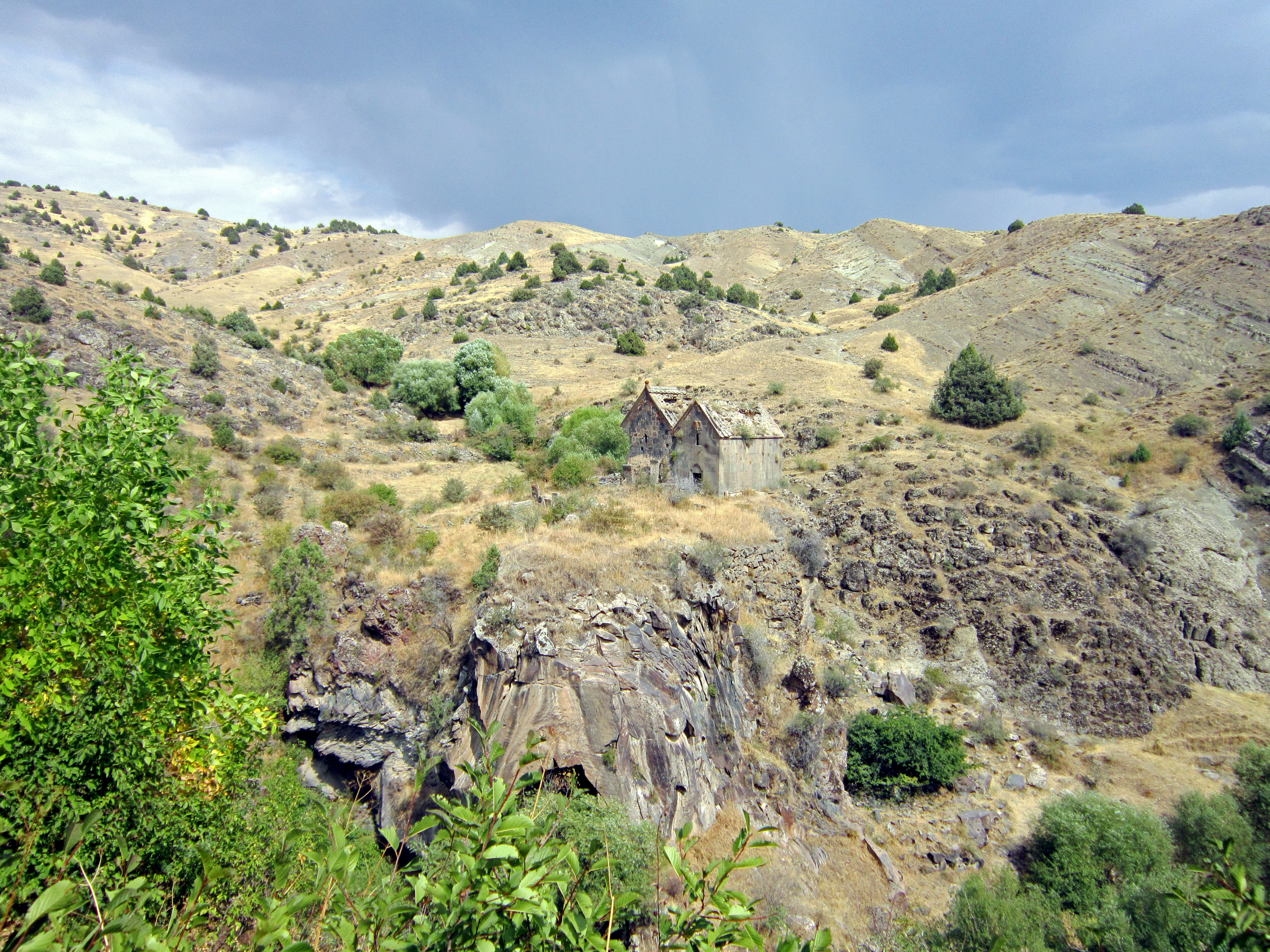
- St. Sion Monastery in Herher

- Location within Armenia Location within Vayots Dzor
- Coordinates: 39°46′24″N 45°32′19″E
- Country: Armenia
- Province: Vayots Dzor
- Municipality: Vayk
- Elevation: 1,680 m (5,510 ft)

Population (2011)
  - Total: 706
- Time zone: UTC+4 (AMT)

Herher (Armenian: Հերհեր) is a village in the Vayk Municipality of the Vayots Dzor Province of Armenia.

== History ==
Herher was once a fief of the Orbelian vassals, the Shahurnetsi family in the 13th century. Within the village is a 19th-century church of Saint Gevorg, and south is a shrine of Grigor Lusavorich from 1296 with Saint Gevorg or Chiki Vank of 1297. Southeast one km on a hill is the small Kapuyt Berd ("Blue Fortress"). Upon a hilltop one km northeast is Saint Sion Monastery, first mentioned in the 8th century. At the complex are the churches of Saint Sion and Saint Astvatsatsin. Other sites of historical significance are close to Herher, such as village ruins with khachkars of the 14th century.

== Rare endemic fruit ==
Herher boasts a critically endangered species of wild pear found nowhere else in the world: Pyrus gergerana (common name: Gergeranian pear), named for the village. There are estimated to be a mere 50 trees left in the wild, yet, as of 2014, there have been no conservation measures set in place to protect the species - a matter of considerable concern in relation to dwindling biodiversity in Armenia.

== Gallery ==
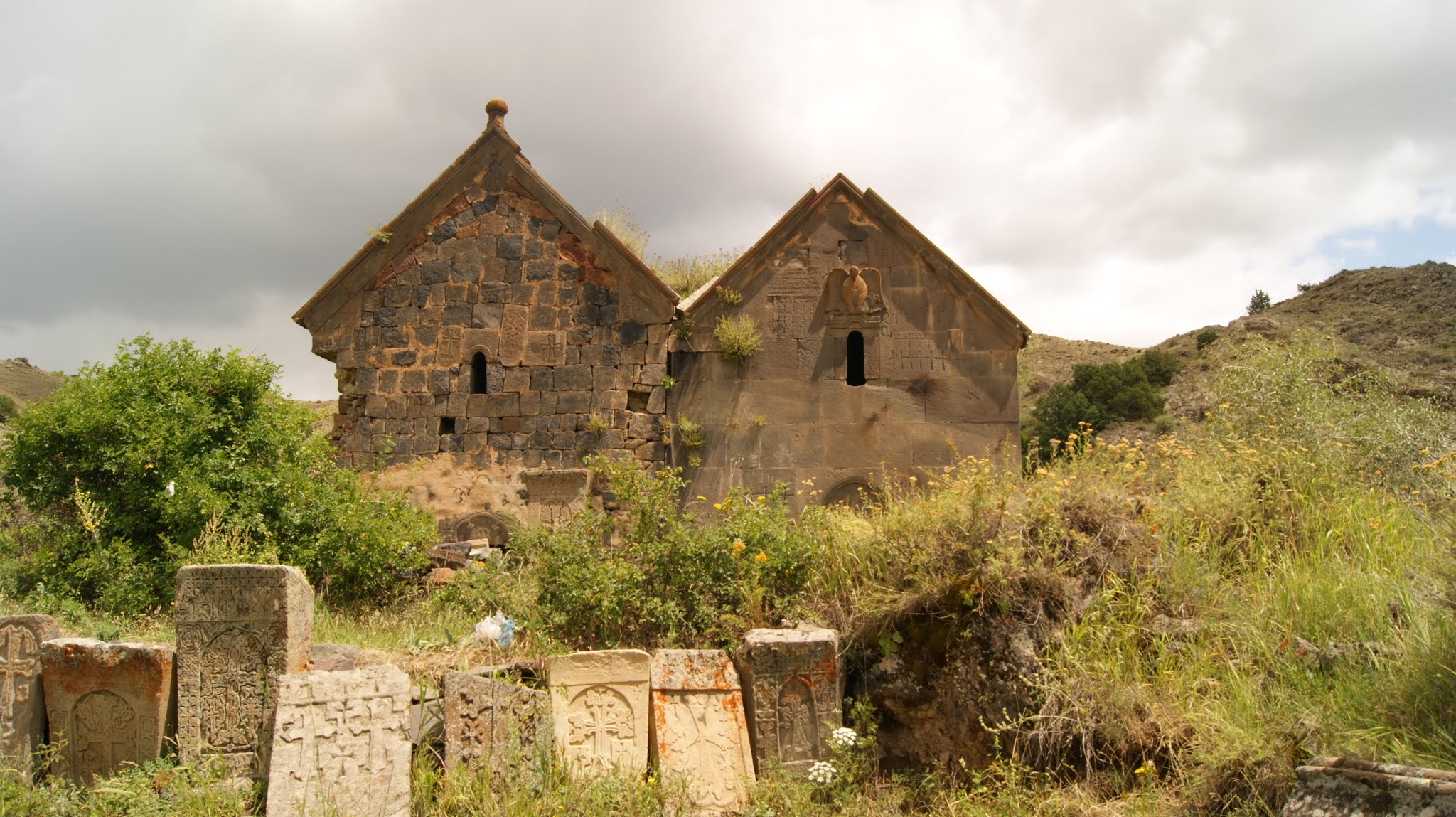
St. Sion Monastery in Herher

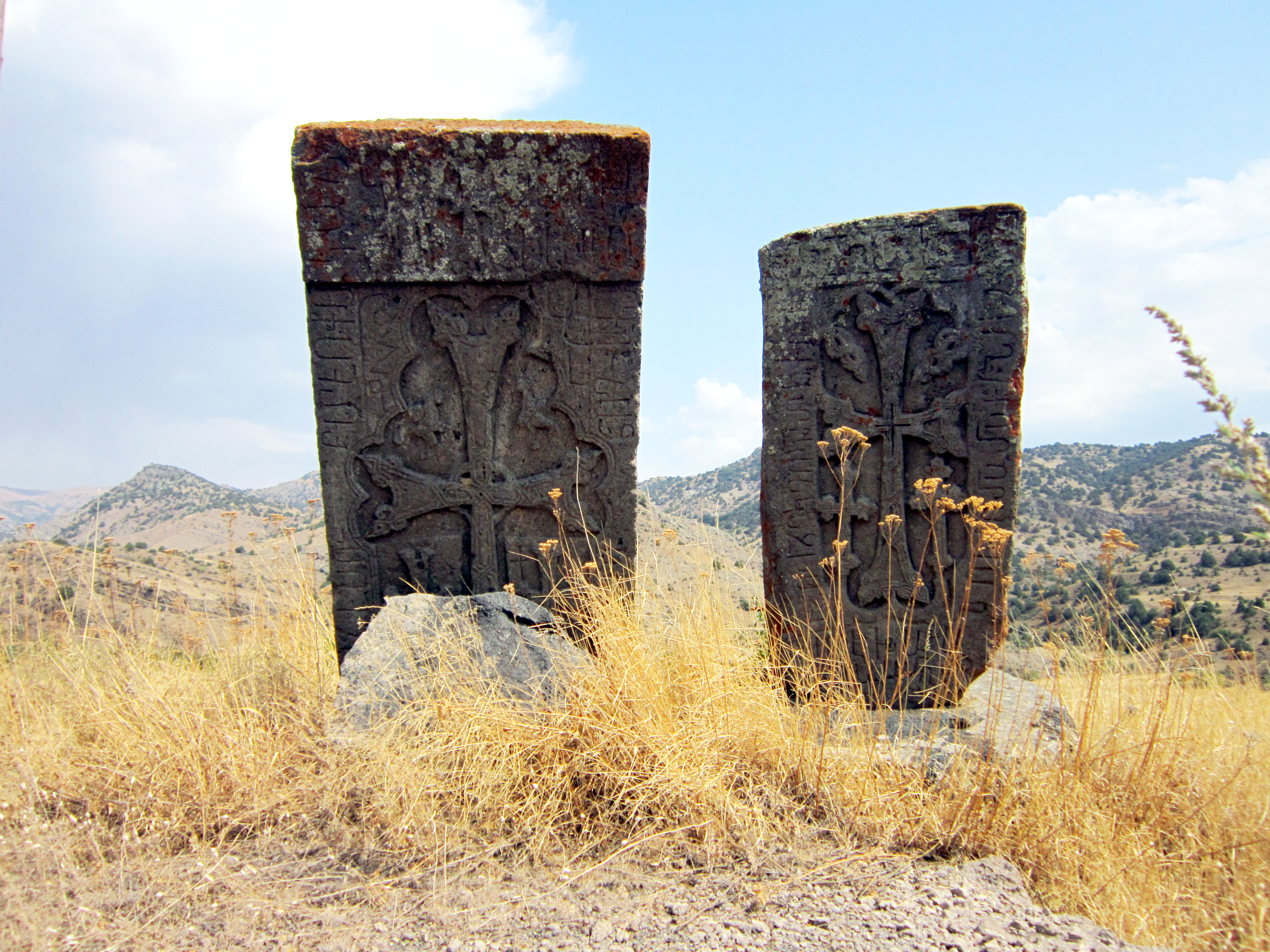
Khachkars in Herher
