= Dar-Alages =

- Vaiyots-Sar
- Location within Armenia

Highest point
- Elevation: 3,329 m (10,922 ft)
- Listing: Volcanoes in Armenia
- Coordinates: 39°34′54″N 45°40′43″E

Geography
- Country: Armenia

Geology
- Mountain type: Pyroclastic cone
- Last eruption: 2000 BCE ± 1000 years

Dar-Alages (Armenian: Դարալագյազ) is a group of six cinder lava cones south of Lake Sevan in Armenia. Fissure eruptions from Vaiyots-Sar dammed the Arpa river at Vayk and continued down the valley for 6 km. These lava flows are considered Holocene in age given the lack of a soil cover and their placement above a Pleistocene river terrace. Smbatassar cinder cones likewise generated two lava flows of 11 and 17 km length that overlie Pleistocene Yeheghis river terraces, thus also dating to the Holocene. Legends of the destruction of the towns Yegheghis and Moz in 735 AD may be linked to activity in these volcanoes.
