= Khorkhor-e Sofla =

Khorkhor-e Sofla خرخرسفلي
- Village
- Location within Iran
- Coordinates: 34°08′08″N 46°55′12″E
- Country: Iran
- Province: Kermanshah
- County: Kermanshah
- Bakhsh: Mahidasht
- Rural District: Mahidasht

Population (2006)
  - Total: 90
- Time zone: UTC+3:30 (IRST)
  - Summer (DST): UTC+4:30 (IRDT)

Khorkhor-e Sofla (Persian: خرخرسفلي, also Romanized as Khorkhor-e Soflá; also known as Khor Khor and Khorkhor) is a village in Mahidasht Rural District, Mahidasht District, Kermanshah County, Kermanshah Province, Iran. At the 2006 census, its population was 90, in 18 families.
