= Javakheti Range =

Mountain range in Georgia and Armenia

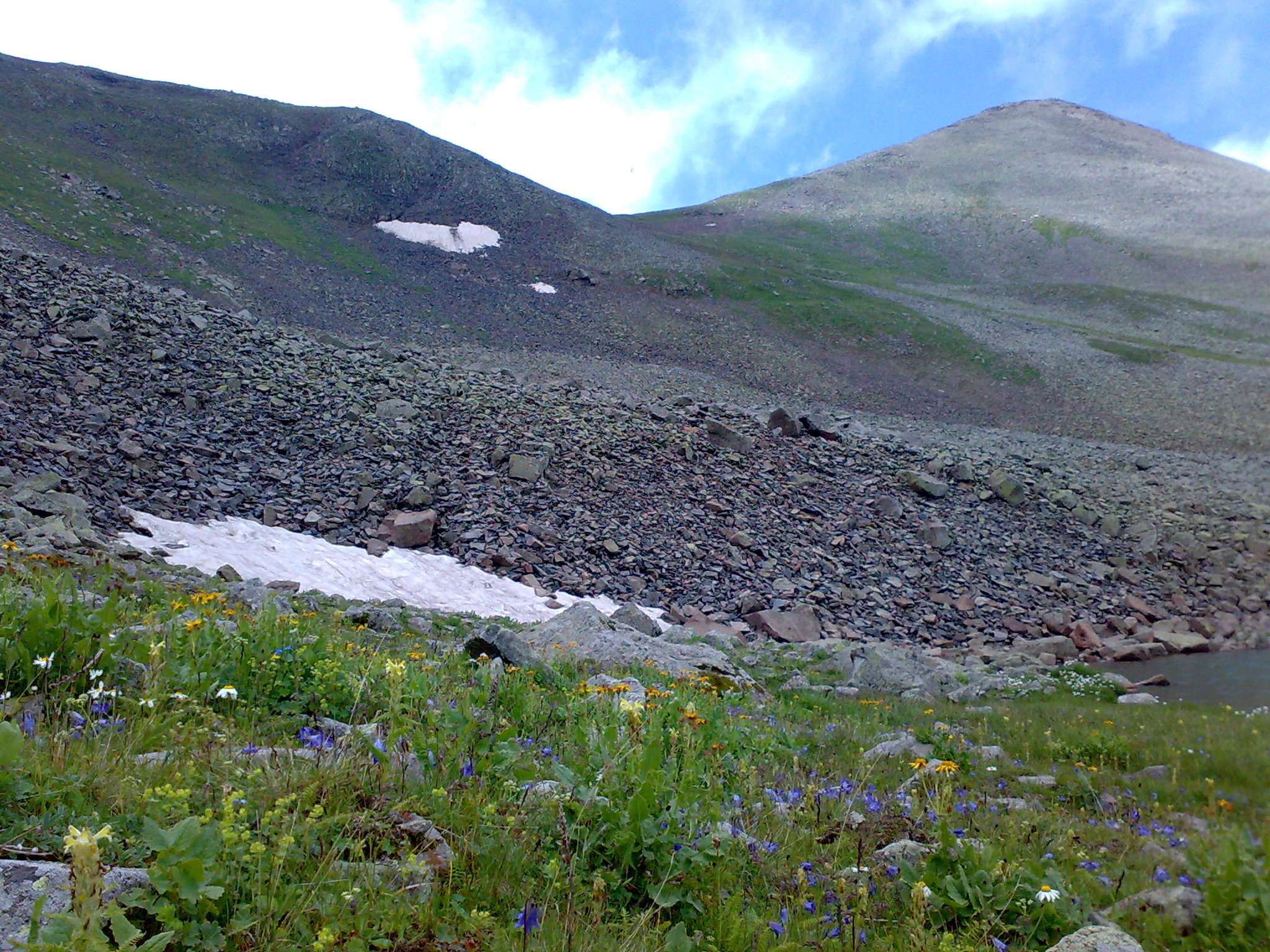
- View of Mount Achkasar

Highest point
- Peak: Achkasar
- Elevation: 3,196 m (10,486 ft)

Dimensions
- Length: 50 km (31 mi)

Geography
- Location within Samtskhe-Javakheti Location within Georgia Location within Armenia
- Countries: Armenia and Georgia
- Range coordinates: 41°09′23″N 43°57′33″E
- Parent range: Caucasus Mountains
- Borders on: Greater Caucasus

The Javakheti or Javakhk Range (also Kechut Range or Wet Mountains; Georgian: ჯავახეთის ქედი; Armenian: Ջավախքի լեռնաշղթա) is a volcanic range (from the Pliocene-Quaternary eras) in southern Georgia and northern Armenia, part of the Caucasus Mountains. To the southeast is Lake Arpi National Park, to the west Javakheti Plateau.

The range is about 50 km (31 mi) long and runs north to south from Trialeti to the Bazum Range. It parallels the Samsari Range. Within Georgia, its width is about 25 kilometres (16 mi).

The Chochiani, Shavtskala and Mashavera rivers originate on the eastern slopes of the range. It contains shield-shaped craterless volcanoes, with a wide base and a small relative height.

The highest peak is Mount Achkasar, at an elevation of 3,196 metres (10,486 ft). Other notable peaks include Leyli (3156), Yemlikli (3054), Garanlig (3039), Aghrigar (2973) and Shambiani (2923).

It is a Key Biodiversity Area and is home to Vipera darevskii, also known as Darevsky's viper, which is listed as Critically Endangered on the IUCN Red List.

The range is mainly covered with alpine meadows and grasslands. There are a number of small-sized lakes in and around the Javakheti Range.

== See also ==
- Javakheti Plateau
- Abul-Samsari Range
- Lesser Caucasus
