= Arteni =

Village in Armavir, Armenia

Arteni Արտենի
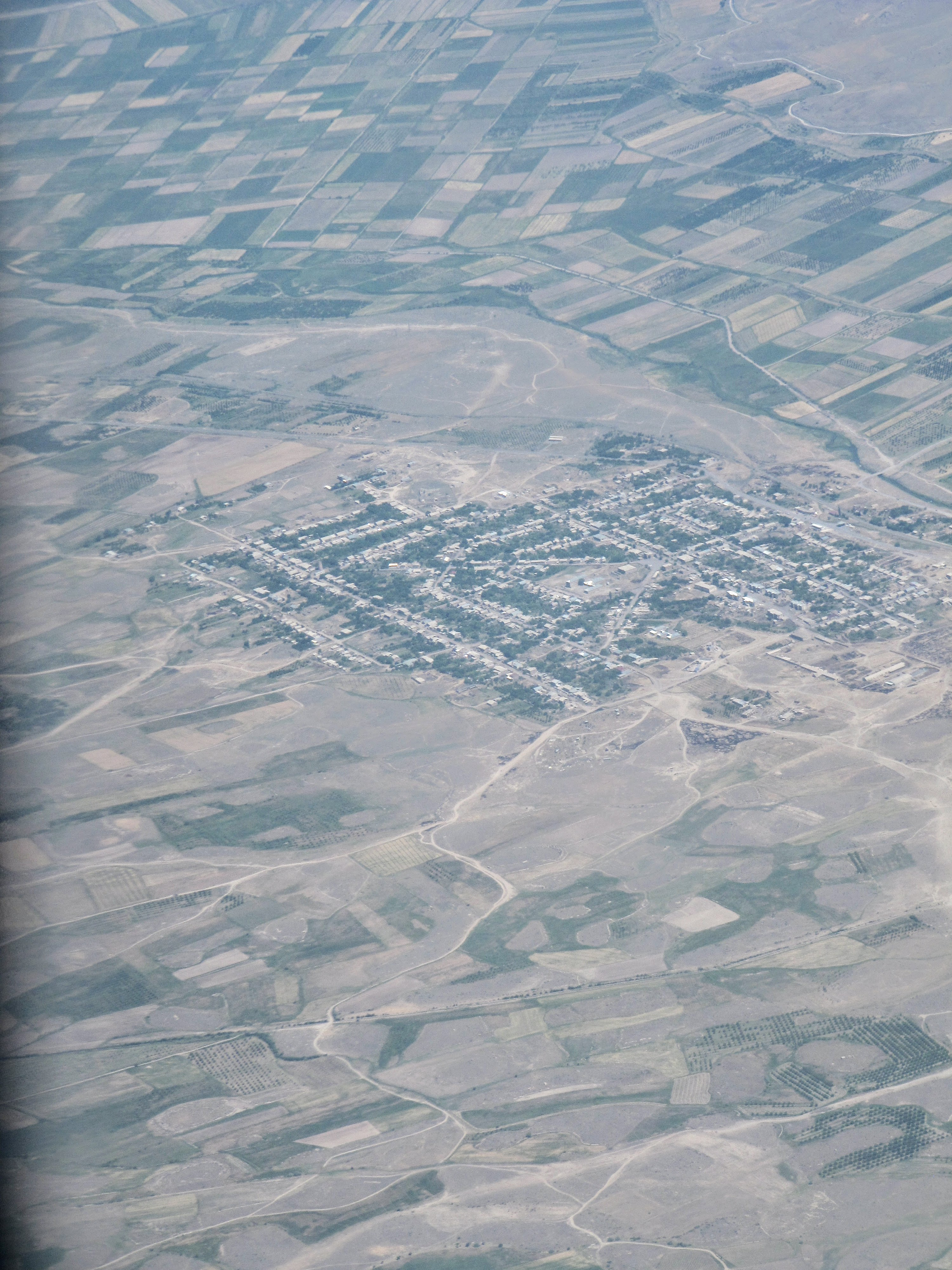
- Arteni, seen from the air.

- Location within Armenia Location within Aragatsotn
- Coordinates: 40°17′54″N 43°45′15″E
- Country: Armenia
- Province: Aragatsotn
- Municipality: Aragatsavan

Population (2011)
  - Total: 3,278

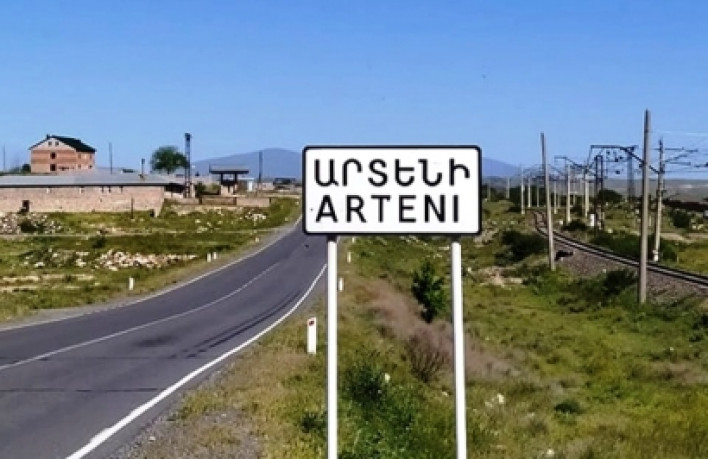
The Arteni village entrance

Arteni (Armenian: Արտենի) is a village in the Aragatsavan Municipality of the Aragatsotn Province of Armenia. The town contains a wine factory.
