= Mount Achkasar =

Mountain in Armenia

Achkasar
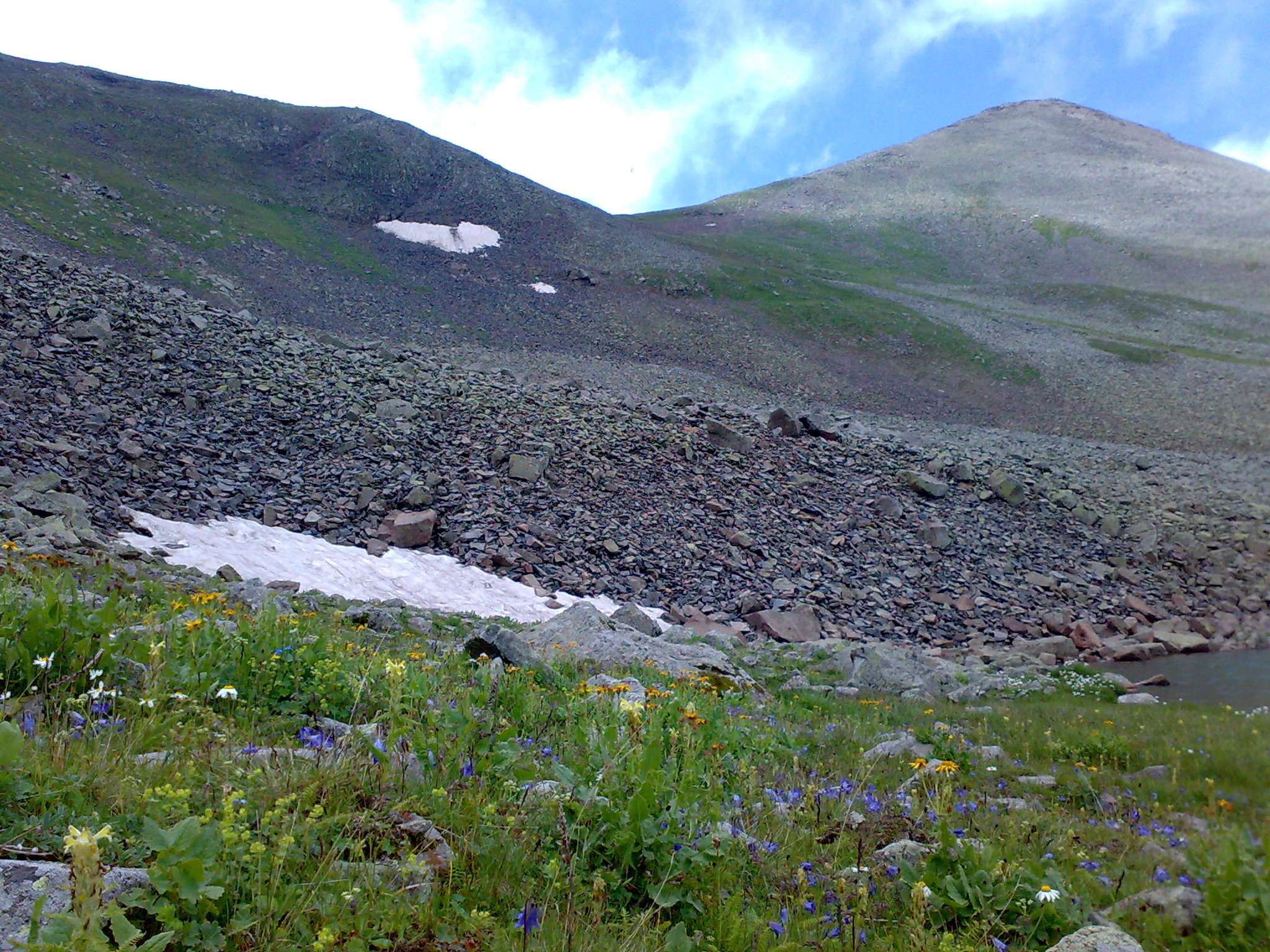

Highest point
- Elevation: 3,197 m (10,489 ft)
- Coordinates: 41°09′23″N 43°57′33″E

Geography
- Location within Armenia
- Location: Armenia
- Parent range: Javakheti Range

Geology
- Rock age: Quaternary

Mount Achkasar (Armenian: Աչքասար) is a 3,197 m (10,489 ft) tall mountain in Northern Armenia. Achkasar is the highest peak of the Javakheti range in the Lesser Caucasus Mountains.

== See also ==
- Javakheti Plateau
- Mount Leyli
- Mount Yemlikli

== Image gallery ==
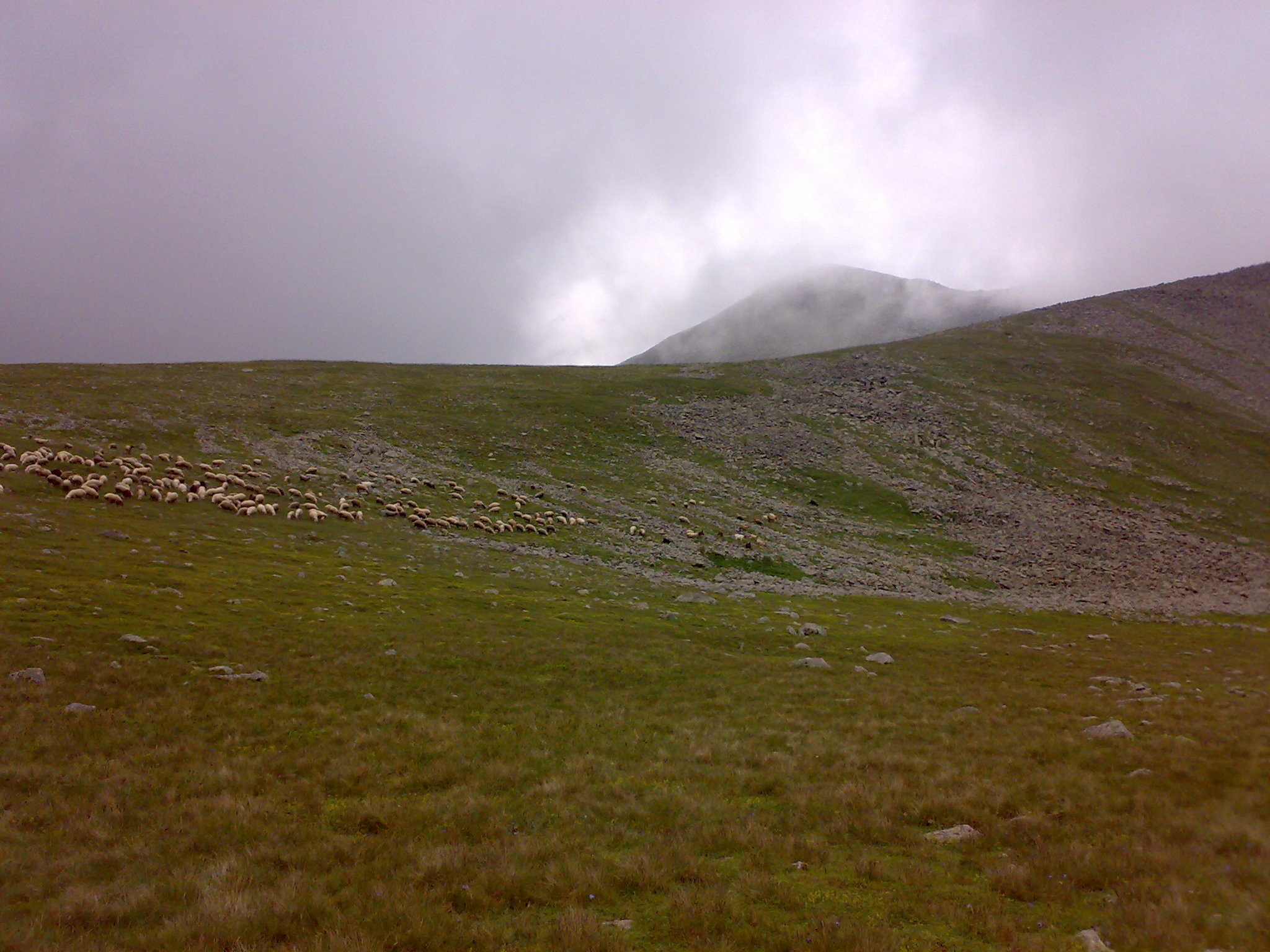

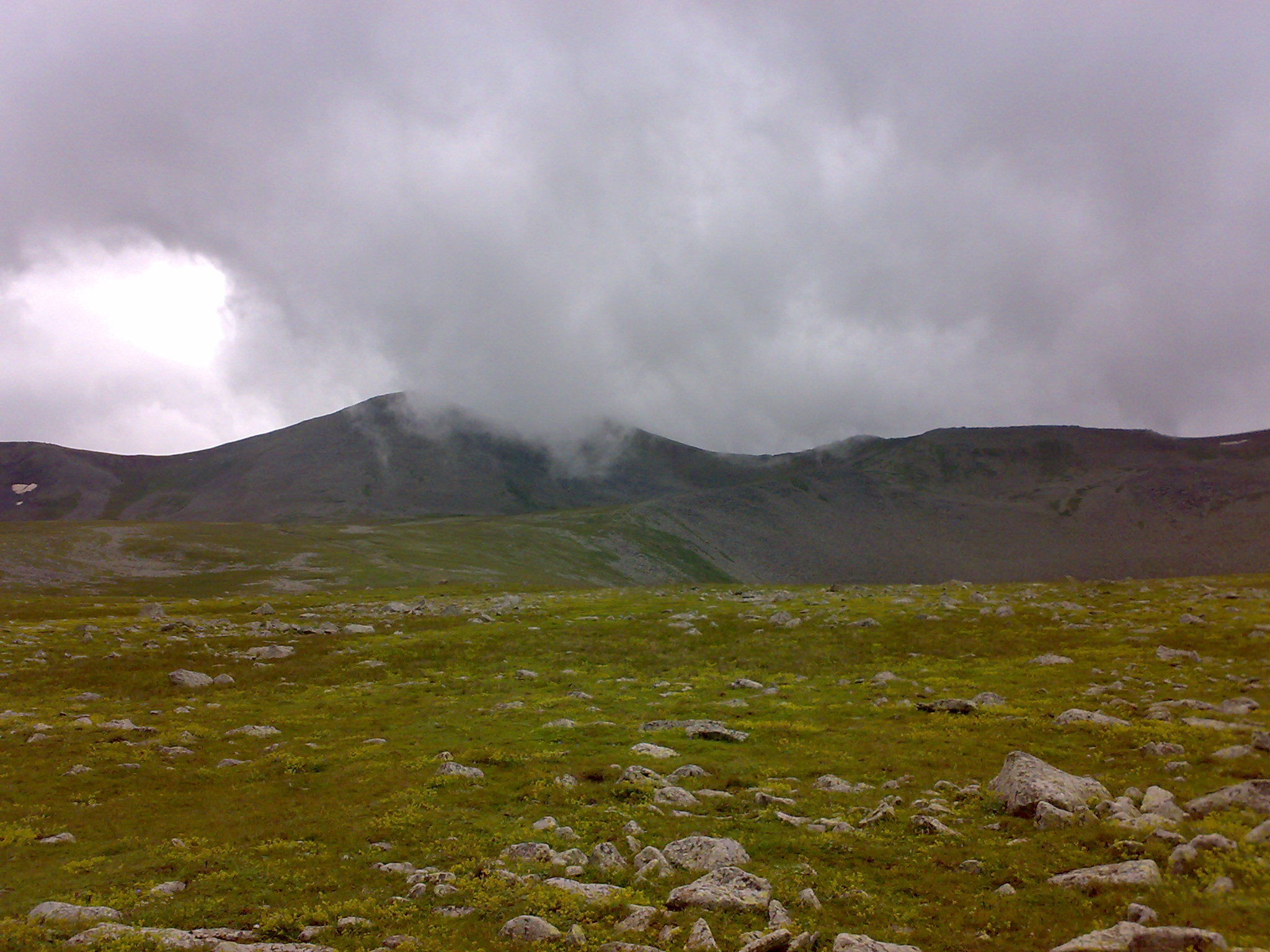
