= Degenfeld =

District of Schwäbisch Gmünd, Germany

- Stadtteil of Schwäbisch Gmünd
- Coat of arms
- Interactive map of Degenfeld
- Location within Germany Location within Baden-Württemberg
- Coordinates: 48°43′32.5″N 9°52′48.6″E
- Country: Germany
- State: Baden-Württemberg
- Town: Schwäbisch Gmünd

Area
  - Total: 9.26 km^{2} (3.58 sq mi)

Population (2014)
  - Total: 455
  - Density: 49.1/km^{2} (127/sq mi)
- Time zone: UTC+01:00 (CET)
  - Summer (DST): UTC+02:00 (CEST)

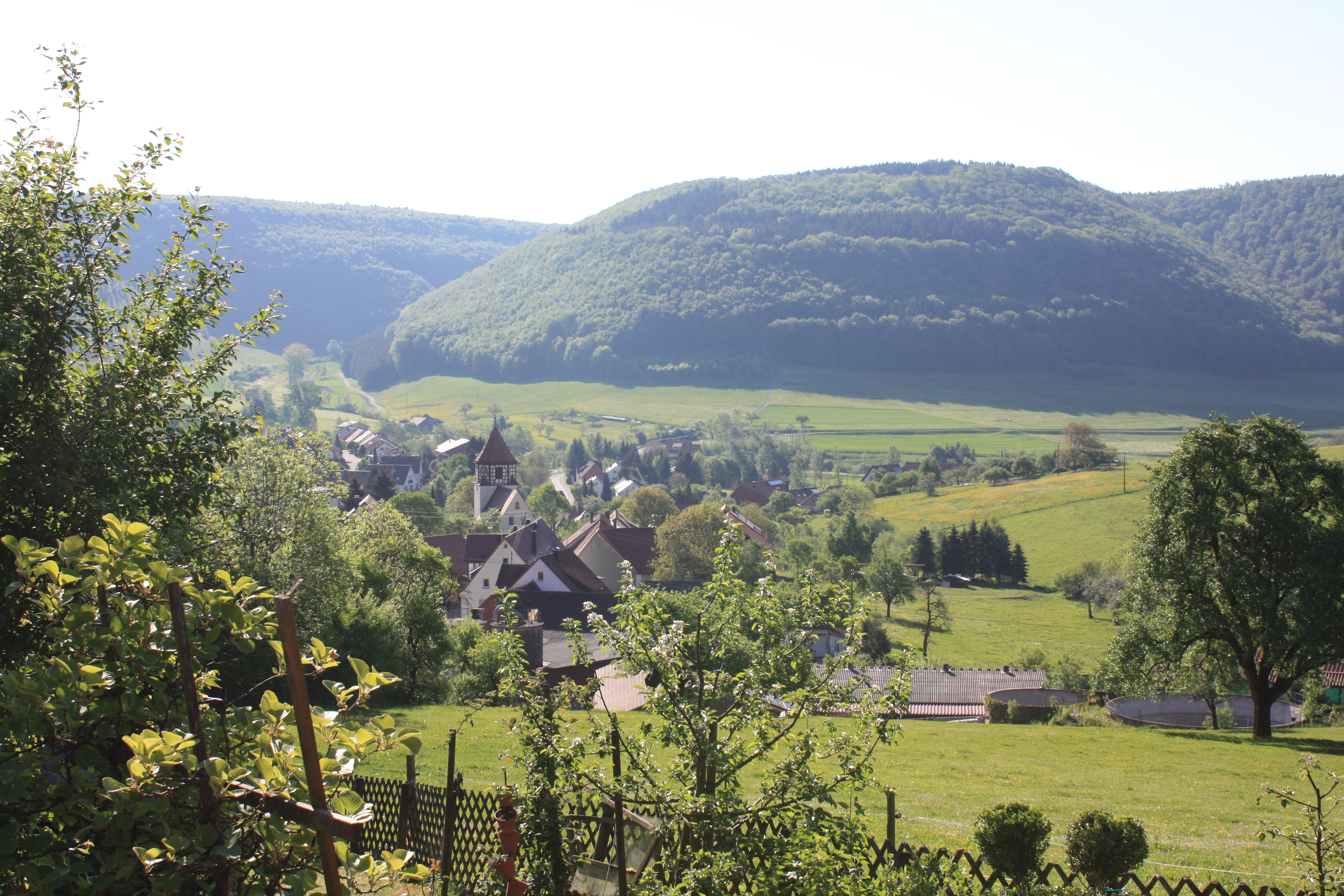
View of Degenfeld

Degenfeld is a part of Schwäbisch Gmünd in Baden-Württemberg, Germany. It borders Weiler in den Bergen to the north, Lauterstein to the south and east and two districts of Waldstetten (Weilerstoffel and Tannweiler) to the west.

== History ==
Degenfield was formerly a town in Germany. There was less or none evidence of the settlement during the Stone Age. Josef Seehofer, a local researcher and colleagues wrote about Paleolithic findings at Rosenstein near Heubach also known as the Mesolithic finds in Treffelhausen, a neighboring land and Waldenbühl which is close to Donzdorf and connects to Degenfeld. The research also stated the Bronze Age burial mounds at Falkenberg, a land east of Degenfeld were also associated with the place.

In 1906 during the Roman period, remains of walls and constructions excavated near the famous Protestant church were interpreted as the remains of a Roman watchtower but with less citations and verification especially from the Romans.

The medieval beginnings of the place also seemed unclear and confusing. The name of the land was formed from a field name where "Degel" means gray or blue fertile clay. Further east of Degenfeld, especially viewing from a meadow area above the confluence of Glasklinge and Schweintal lies the field, Buittingen. (Note: The name could refer to an abandoned place that used to exist on that land.)

=== Middle Ages ===
"Ůlricus de Degenvelt miles" was the pioneer written reference to the land since 1270. In early 1275, Tegenuelt church situated in Geislingen deanery was listed in a directory of the Diocese of Constance. Then, the Degenfeld castle was built towards the ending of the 14th century. Thus, dividing the land into half where one of it called, the right Lauter was ruled by the Lords of Degenfeld known also to be the founder of the church's patronage while the left of the Lauter was taken over by the Rechberg Weißenstein. In 1456, the Degenfelders moved their home to the newly acquired castle called the "Eybach Castle" which was close to Geislingen.

In 1597, Christoph von Degenfeld, one of the Degenfelders sold his shares to Duke Friedrich of Württemberg including the church patronage which inturn was moved to Königsbronn monastery office. Württemberg the Duke contributed towards the extra division of the land by implementing the reformation of the empire.

=== 1800-1890 ===
In 1806, Rechberg lost shares and surrendered to Württemberg. Hence, the division came to an end in 1809 through the establishment of the Independent municipality of Degenfeld in the Oberamt Gmünd. Nenningen was also among Degenfeld before it was conquered by the Geislingen Oberamt in 1810.

Although the town was located away from major traffic routes and the population hardly grew - from the early 19th century to the beginning of the Second World War, the number was about 300 inhabitants although Degenfeld was considered a wealthy town in the Oberamt.

=== 1900-1999 ===
In 1934 till the next year 1935, The Catholic church was built. In 1945, Allied air raids devastated the Hornberg air camp and the huts especially ones used for ski jumping which was located on the Kalten Feld. Anti-tank barriers were erected at the Furtlepass, Germany and at the town exits which was towards Schwäbisch Gmünd and Weißenstein because of its importance for the "Alba Uplift". However, the place was to be defended by a small unit of the Wehrmacht and Volkssturm. The Schwäbisch Gmünd district leaders stayed in Degenfeld till after the Wehrmacht units of April 24, 1945 when they left.

After the end of the war (conflict) in 1945, the small community took in about 131 displaced people, most of whom came from Sudetenland including mayor Libor Steppan. In 1955, the municipality of Degenfeld applied for separation from the Schwäbisch Gmünd district to join the Göppingen district. Schwäbisch Gmünd district and it's council and district council rejected the request with reason stating that the district considerable costs were incurred for infrastructure measures for the glider pilot camp of the Hornberg. The request was later withdrawn.

=== Full incorporation into Schwäbisch Gmünd ===
In 1970, According to the Ministry of the Interior planning for the regional reform,

Degenfeld was originally supposed to be separated from the Schwäbisch Gmünd district and, together with the municipality of Nenningen and the city of Weißenstein, form a new administrative unit within the Göppingen district; This plan met with approval in Degenfeld. More residents commuted to the lower Lauter Valley and the subsequent Fil Valley than to the Rem Valley.

In 1964, Degenfeld, Nenningen and Weißenstein had formed the "Wastewater association "Oberes Lautertal" and school children from Degenfeld attended secondary schools in Nenningen and Weißenstein and in 1966, a primary school was built in Weißenstein which also prompted the construction of another secondary school to be used jointly by the trio.

1n 1970 When it was undoubtedly clear that the proposed new secondary school building by Weißenstein will not be approved, Degenfeld contacted the city of Schwäbisch Gmünd. The local council in the city became interested in incorporating Degenfeld. The city of Weißenstein in supported by Göppingen district office and the municipality of Waldstetten also showed interest.

In April that same year during the citizens' meeting, Norbert Schoch the mayor of Schwäbisch Gmünd won the Degenfelder for his municipality through promises to promote tourism and expand the infrastructure in as much as mayor Libor Steppan, Degenfeld's mayor had already rejected incorporation into Waldstetten. The mayor of Weißenstein and the district administrator of Göppingen and the mayor of Schwäbisch Gmünd tried to influence the mayor of Degenfeld to hold a public issue sitting. On May 10, 1970 a voting process was taken for the incorporation of Degenfeld into Schwäbisch Gmünd. Friedrich Roemer, president of the district and Representatives of the Ministry of the Interior after the voting tried to change the Degenfelders' minds about the incorporation. On 23 and 27 July 1970 After the municipal councils of Schwäbisch Gmünd and Degenfeld had approved the incorporation agreement, the regional council issued an order on November 13, 1970, agreeing to the incorporation of Degenfeld into Schwäbisch Gmünd. It was completed on January 1, 1971. Degenfeld became the southernmost district of Schwäbisch Gmünd.

== Geography ==
Degenfeld is situated at the southeast of Schwäbisch Gmünd near a valley which flows approximately southwards lying on the local area below the Furtle Pass. As a rocky surrounded area, the rock layers of the mountains around Degenfeld on the valley flanks of the Degenfelder Lauter valley were formerly called the Jurassic Sea. The Degenfelder valley was formed by the Ur-Eyb.

== Coat of arms ==
Coat of arms

The coat of arms above is a blue shield base in a red-silver (white) quartered shield, two crossed arrows in alternate colors. In February 1957, the coat of arm was officially approved by the Baden-Württemberg Ministry of the Interior while the flag was red and white coloured. The coat of arms was derived from the old form of the coat of arms of the Counts of Degenfeld, who had their ancestral home in the district. (Note: Like all coats of arms and flags of the formerly independent communities of Gmünd, the Degenfeld symbols ceased to be an official symbol after their incorporation on January 1, 1971.) The crossed arrows represent Saint Sebastian. (see image below)

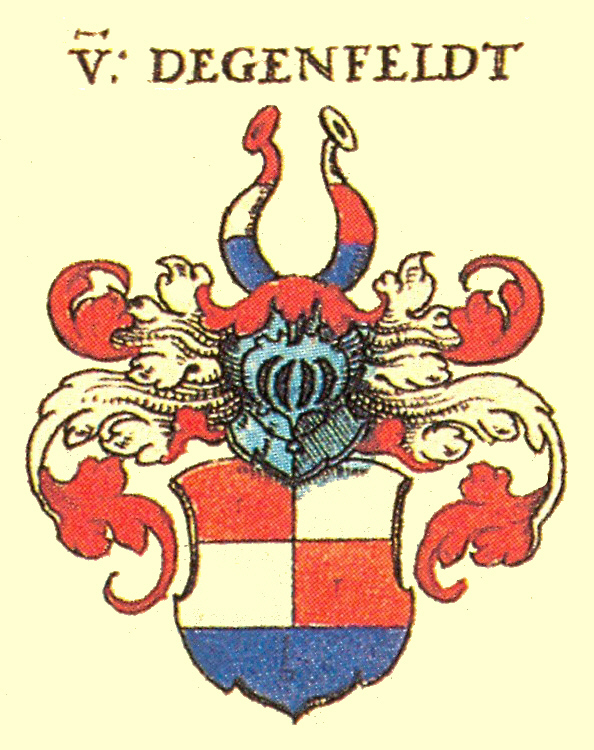
The family coat of arms of the Counts of Degenfeld

== Culture and Infrastructure ==
The district is surrounded by forests, mountains and valleys making it possible to have high variety of trails for hiking. It populated the building of a house called the ski since 1970 on Kalten Feld opened during the inauguration of the Degenfeld ski jumping in 1926. It became a venue for tourism and hiking competition including Swabian championships which took place in 1927.

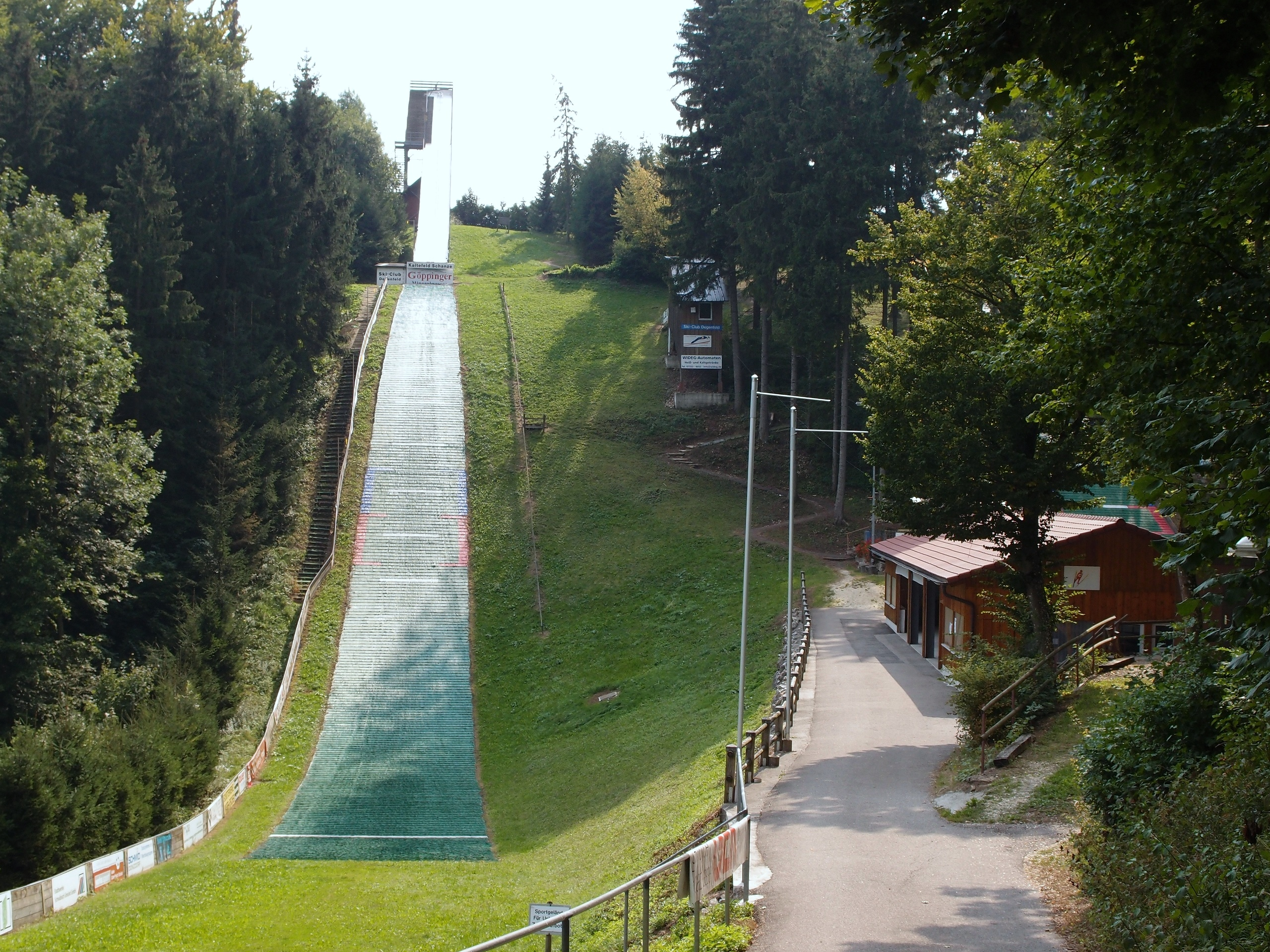
Sky jump platform in Degenfeld

Due to this expansion and the topography of the district, Degenfeld held the establishment of Degenfeld SC, Schwäbisch Gmünd Ski Club and others. In 1963, they were jointly called the United Ski Guild Kaltes Feld. After the dissolving of the guild in 2010, the Schwäbisch Gmünd Snowshoe Club took over the management of the Ski operations.

== Sports ==
Degenfield is known as the home of ski-jumping in Germany. In 1901, The town's oldest club, Liederkranz Degenfeld offered foundation to the establishment in 1922 of the Degenfeld Ski Club known as SC Degenfield has garnered about 300 members including the Olympic game at Cortina d'Ampezzo. Josef Nägele called it "...a village of Ski."

=== 1926- 1930 ===
Since the inception in 1922, the first ever ski jump was inaugurated in 1926. Following the inauguration was the establishment of The Degenfeld Children's Ski Festival in 1929.

=== 1950-1970 ===
Ski jumping became popular in 1950s with the massive attendance during the Ski festival in Degenfeld. In 1952, Ewald Roscher won the festival competition and afterwards became the national coach of German Ski Association in 1956, four years after. The event has also favoured Stefanie Köhrer, the club's first female athlete at the 1956 Olympic Games in Cortina d'Ampezzo, Italy and Carina Vogt at the 2014 Olympic Games in Sochi.

== Religion ==
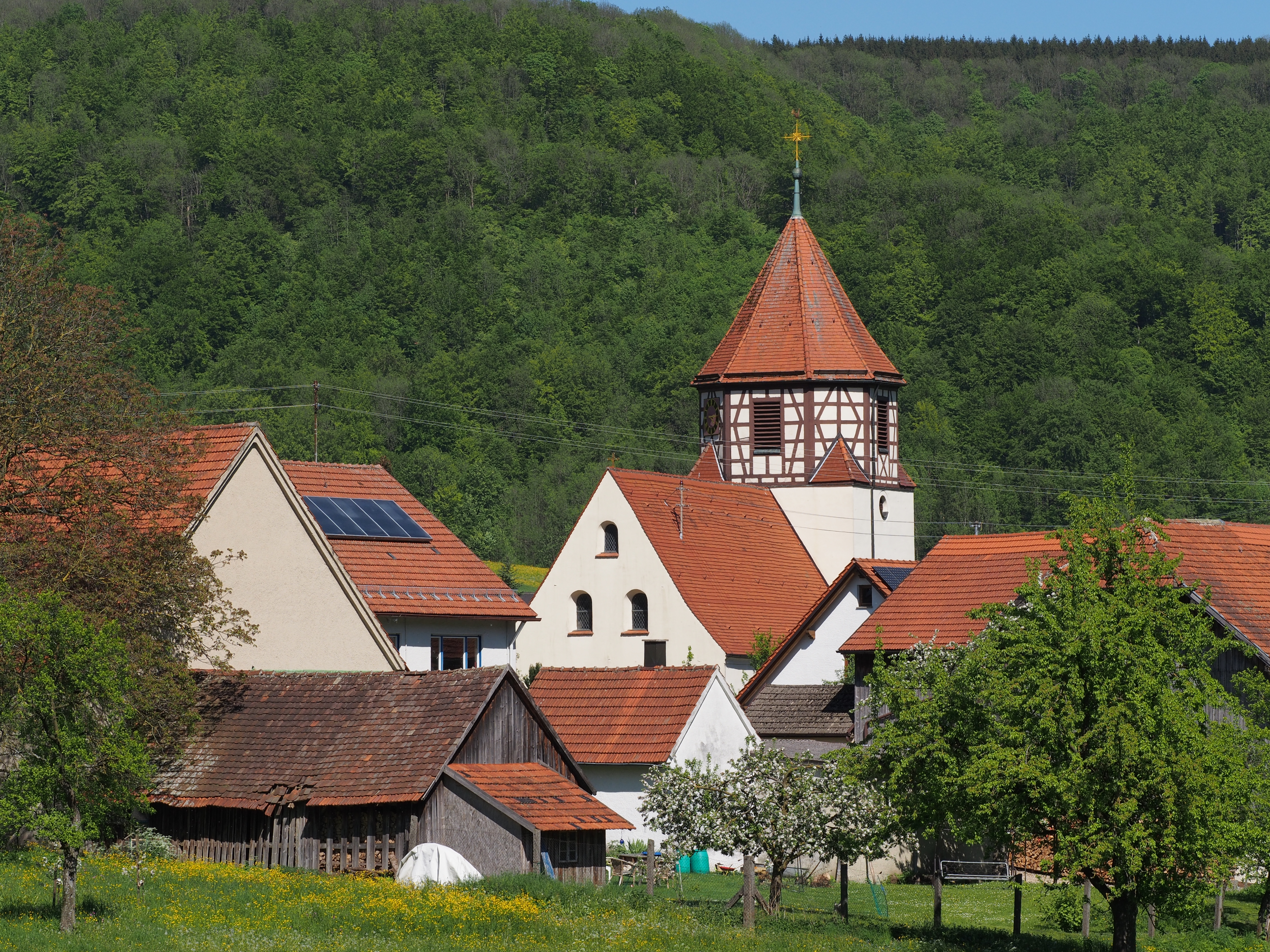
St Sebastian and Walburga church in Degenfeld, Schwäbisch Gmünd, Germany

Since 2006, Roman catholicism is foremost practiced especially with The Catholic parish of Degenfeld having been emerged from St. Michael Weiler Parish, Bergen. There are also Unterm Bernhardus pastoral care unit located in Ostalb deanery. In 1806, since the existence of Bernhardus pilgrimage church and it's demolition, it laid foundation for Catholic parish church of Mary's Name and St. Sebastian in 1919, thereby increasing the nature of Christianity in the district.
