= Armenian Biathlon Federation =

Sports organization of Armenia

The Armenian Biathlon Federation (Armenian: Հայաստանի բիաթլոնի ֆեդերացիա), is the regulating body of biathlon in Armenia, governed by the Armenian Olympic Committee. The headquarters of the federation is located in Gyumri.

== History ==
Armenian biathlon athletes first participated in biathlon tournaments under the Soviet Union. The Armenian Biathlon Federation was established in 2007. Vardevan Grigoryan is the current president. The Federation oversees the training of biathlon specialists and organizes Armenia's participation in European and international level biathlon competitions. The Federation maintains cooperation with the Armenian Ski Federation. The Federation is a full member of the International Biathlon Union.

== See also ==
- Armenian Shooting Federation
- National Federation of Modern Pentathlon of Armenia
- Sport in Armenia
