= International Biathlon Union =

International sports governing body organizing biathlon

Coordinates: 47°47′28″N 13°03′03″E

- Sport: Biathlon
- Jurisdiction: International
- Founded: 2 July 1993; 33 years ago
- Headquarters: Anif b. Salzburg, Austria
- President: Tim Farcnik

Official website
- www.biathlonworld.com

The International Biathlon Union (IBU; German: Internationale Biathlon-Union) is the IOC (International Olympic Committee) authorized international governing body of biathlon. Its headquarters were in Salzburg, Austria, until May 2020, when the Federation moved to Anif, on the outskirts of the city. It was rocked by a corruption scandal that broke in 2018, concerning the Russians bribing its top two officials. In 2022 Russia and Belarus were suspended from all international biathlon competitions until further notice.

== Members ==
64 nations (March 2026):

1. Africa (1): Morocco
2. Americas (7): Argentina, Brazil, Canada - Biathlon Canada, Chile, Dominican Republic, Mexico, United States-USBA
3. Asia (11): China, Chinese Taipei, India, Japan, Kazakhstan, South Korea, Kyrgyzstan, Lebanon, Mongolia, Thailand, Uzbekistan
4. Europe (43): Andorra, Armenia-ABF, Austria, Belarus, Belgium, Bosnia and Herzegovina, Bulgaria, Croatia, Cyprus, Czech Republic, Denmark, Estonia, Finland, France, Georgia, Germany-DSV, Greece, Greenland, Hungary, Iceland, Ireland, Italy, Latvia, Liechtenstein, Lithuania, Luxembourg, Moldova, Netherlands, North Macedonia, Norway, Poland, Portugal, Romania, Russia, Serbia, Slovakia, Slovenia, Spain, Sweden, Switzerland, Turkey, Ukraine, United Kingdom
5. Oceania (2): Australia-ABA, New Zealand

== History ==
=== 1920–1953 ===
Military patrol part of the International Military Sports Council.

=== 1953–1993 ===
Modern Biathlon part of Union Internationale de Pentathlon Moderne.

=== 1993–2009 ===
The International Biathlon Union (IBU) was founded in London on 2 July 1993. This occurred when the National Biathlon Union in London/Heathrow decided to exclude biathlon from the World federation UIPMB (Union de Pentathlon Moderne et Biathlon), which it had been part of since 1953, forcing biathlon to form their own international federation. During the congress the new federation elected their executive committee and the 57 existing members of the UIPMB were automatically transferred to the IBU. However the International Olympic Committee (IOC) did not recognise the IBU as an international Olympic winter sport federation until August 1998. In the same year the Global Association of International Sports Federations (GAISF) declared the IBU as a proper member. The IBU settled in Salzburg, Austria in June 1999. A congress is held every two years, and is considered the most important organ of the IBU according to its constitution. The first congress was held in Salzburg in 1994.

Since the foundation of the IBU, yearly World Championships for men and women have been held, as well as junior World Championships and youth World Championships (the first being held in 2002). The European Championships have been conducted for both senior and junior athletes since the 1994/95 season. The first summer biathlon World Championships took place in Hochfilzen, Austria in 1996. During the 1999/2000 season the IBU assumed the management of archery biathlon from FITA, and archery biathlon World Cups and World Championships have been held since 2002.

In the first Winter Olympics in which biathlon was included there were three events and up until the 2006 games, four. From 2006 onward there have been five biathlon events (Relay, Individual, Mass Start, Sprint, and Pursuit), and from 2014, six with the inclusion of the Mixed Relay.

=== 2010–2019: Russian corruption scandal ===
In 2018 the IBU underwent a corruption scandal with its President Anders Besseberg and his deputy, General Secretary Nicole Resch, accused of accepting bribes from Russia. The two left their positions that year after Austrian and Norwegian authorities announced criminal investigations into their conduct. Besseberg had led biathlon’s governing body for 25 years. During that time, according to a January 2021 report commissioned by biathlon’s new leadership and resulting from a two-year investigation, he accepted gifts from the Russians consisting of cash-filled briefcases totalling at least - but perhaps much more than - $200,000 in bribes, luxury vacations and hunting trips, and young women "aides" during trips to World Cup biathlon events. In return Besseberg defended Russia's athletes, assailed its critics, and blocked efforts to root out doping by Russia's teams. The report also detailed Resch's similar actions.

=== 2020–present: suspension of Russian and Belarusian athletes due to the invasion of Ukraine ===
Due to the Russian invasion of Ukraine, Russia and Belarus Biathlon Federations were suspended from all international biathlon competitions until further notice. IBU banned the participation of Russian and Belarusian athletes and officials at its international events.

== Administration and sponsorship ==
In August 1993, a Secretary-General was appointed, and a secretary for the staff added in 1995. A World Cup coordinator was put in place in the 1997/98 season. The coordinator was promoted to sports director before the start of the 2002/03 season. In April 2001 a communication director position was created. In March 2001 the chairman of the IBU legal committee was the legal advisor for the IBU. In May 2020, the IBU moved to a new headquarters in the municipality of Anif, Austria.

The IBU is a non-profit organization, having contacts contracts with the European Broadcasting Union (EBU) and APF Marketing Services. There are sponsor advertisements along all the biathlon courses, the most notable ones being Hörmann, Bauhaus, Viessmann, LaVita, DKB, and BMW, who is the main sponsor. IFS (software solutions) acts as Official Data Partner and Polar (heart rate monitors) as Timing Partner benefitting from visibility in all TV graphics relating to time measurement. Most of the sponsors are German, Scandinavian, and Eastern European, where most of the interest in biathlon is. In 1996, as part of the IBU development project, partnership contracts were established with some companies, which supplied free materials and equipment to the less fortunate member federations.

The biathlon events most people are familiar with are the World Cup events, which is the season for the elite athletes; there is a second class season called the IBU Cup which has existed since the IBU's foundation. The men and women that finish in the top ten in the overall leader board have their travel and accommodation paid for the next season by the IBU.

== Events ==
- Biathlon at the Winter Olympics
- Biathlon World Championships
- Summer Biathlon World Championships
- Biathlon World Cup
- Biathlon Junior World Championships
- Biathlon European Championships
- IBU Cup

== See also ==
- List of shooting sports organizations
