= National Federation of Modern Pentathlon of Armenia =

Sports organization of Armenia

National Federation of Modern Pentathlon of Armenia logo

The National Federation of Modern Pentathlon of Armenia (Armenian: Հայաստանի ժամանակակից հնգամարտի ազգային ֆեդերացիա), is the regulating body of modern pentathlon in Armenia, governed by the Armenian Olympic Committee. The headquarters of the federation is located in Yerevan.

== History ==
The National Federation of Modern Pentathlon of Armenia is currently led by president Artak Nikoghosyan. The Federation oversees the training of modern pentathletes primarily from the Training School of Young Pentathletes, located in Yerevan. The Federation organizes Armenia's participation in European and international level pentathlon competitions. The Federation also organizes laser-run championship tournaments throughout Armenia. The Federation is a full member of the International Modern Pentathlon Union (UIPM), within the European Confederation Division.

== Activities ==
The 2019 UIPM Global Laser Run City Tour, was hosted by the Federation in Yerevan.

== See also ==
- Armenian Biathlon Federation
- Armenian Shooting Federation
- Sport in Armenia
