= Joy A. Alemazung =

German politician and lecturer (born 1974)

Mayor of Heubach
- In office January 1, 2022 - present
- Preceded by: Frederick Brütting

Personal details
- Born: December 18, 1974 (age 51)
- Citizenship: Germany
- Party: Christian Democratic Union of Germany (CDU)
- Spouse: Barbara Akateh Alemazung (née Taza-Asaba)
- Children: 3
- Parents: Thomas Njingu Alemazung; Apolonia Asong Alemazung
- Education: University of Erlangen-Nürnberg, University of Kiel
- Website: https://alemazung.de/

Joy Asongazoh Alemazung (born 18 December 1974) is a Cameroonian born politician and associate lecturer at the University of Applied Sciences, School of International Business in Bremen. He is the first African born mayor of a German city, Heubach, and a member of the Christian Democratic Union Party (CDU).

== Early life and education ==
He was born and raised in the coastal city of Victoria (currently Limbe) at the foot of Mount Cameroon. After his primary and secondary education, he moved to Germany in June 1997 to further his education. He was awarded a master's degree in Sociology and Political Science in 2005 from the university of Erlangen-Nuremberg, Germany.

At age 35, he earned his doctorate from the University of Kiel, Germany (2009) in Political Science. His doctoral research topic was on: States’ Constitutions, Political Transformation and Governance in Sub-Sahara Africa with Benin, Cameroon and Democratic Republic of Congo as case studies.

== Religion and religious commitments ==
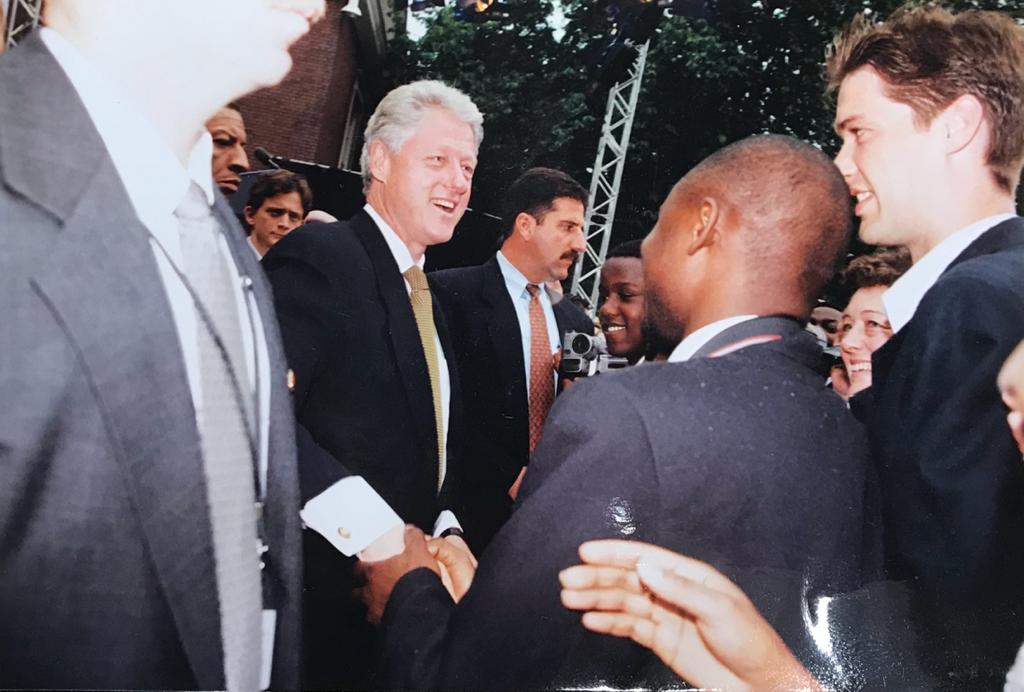
Alemazung greets President Bill Clinton during his visit to Bonn in June 1999

He was raised a Catholic Christian and his Christian faith impacts every aspect of his life. As a lector in Saint Thomas More International Catholic Chaplaincy, he met President Bill Clinton during a short visit to the church campus in Bonn, June 1999. In a portrait of Alemazung by the Deutscher Evangelischer Kirchentag, DEKT (Evangelical Church in Germany), he describes his father as the greatest pedagogist he ever knew.

While Alemazung was attending High School in Cameroon, the “winds of democratic change” struck Cameroon and Africa. Alemazung had observed the “disconnecting and disaffecting” lifestyle of youths in Cameroon, something which preoccupied him considerably. He presented a research on this topics at the annual conference of the society for applied sociology in Kansas city in October 2001. He published his first article as a student in 2004 titled “Disaffected and Disconnected: Consequences of Globalization for African Societies” in Samir Dasgupta (ed), The Changing Face of Globalization. India/London: Sage Publications.

He started searching for solutions and ways to help alleviate what, to him, was the “collapse of the society in terms of social (taking note of the case of the youth), political (democratic transitions in conflict regions and ethnically diverse societies) and economic (poverty) sustainability." In Cameroon like in Germany he is actively committed to serving his community through voluntary service in the church and civic organizations. He has served as a member of the Catholic church committee (Catholic Parish in Erlangen, Catholic Parish in Bremen, Catholic Parish in Stuttgart), as soccer youth trainer with the Bundesliga Club Werder Bremen and as an executive member of NGOs (Afrika ist auch in Bremen, African Good Governance Network e.V. active in the areas of development politics, international relations, migration as well as the civic and political education of the German Society.

== Professional life ==
During his PhD Research at the University of Kiel he worked as teaching assistant and coordinator of the ERASMUS program at the Department of Political Science. Upon completing his PhD he moved to Bremen where he was lecturer and international student counsellor at the University of Applied Sciences Bremen until 2013, when he joined the German federal government organisation for development initiatives, Engagement Global gGmbH in March 2013.

From March 2013 to December 2019, he was a project manager for the Federal States of Baden-Württemberg and Bavaria at Engagement Global gGmbH, a service for the development initiative of the Federal Ministry of Economic Cooperation and Development. As part of his function as project manager for development-related education in Germany with Engagement Global gGmbH, Alemazung advised and supported organized civil society, municipalities as well as governmental and non-governmental institutions with federal funding from the Federal Ministry for Economic Cooperation and Development. This included sensitization programs on UN Sustainable development goals (SDGs) for civil societies and local governments as well as contributing to the United Nations Agenda 2030 in German federal states.

Some significant projects of Alemazung within the framework of the UN Agenda 2030 and the 17 sustainable development goals include:

- SDG4: Global Citizenship Education for Youth in Baden-Württemberg. This concept was implemented from April 2017 to July 2018 with the participation of 6 schools (12 Classes/Working Groups) in the state of Baden-Württemberg. In 2016 close to 200 pupils received training and lectures from over 20 international experts on diverse sustainable development topics applying varying children-friendly methods.
- Agenda 5/17: Gender Equality through Partnership. For this project Alemazung worked with the UN Women national committee Germany and its president Ms Karin Nordmeyer as the main cooperation partner. Many conferences were organized in the federal states of Baden-Württemberg and Bavaria as well as in Brussels – European Development Days 2018 (Press Conference). Speakers and participating institutions included: the ambassadors of Ghana and Rwanda to Germany Ms Gina Ama Blay and Igor César, Nobel peace prize laureate Ms Tawakkol Karman, representative of the social ministries of Baden-Württemberg and Bavaria amongst others.

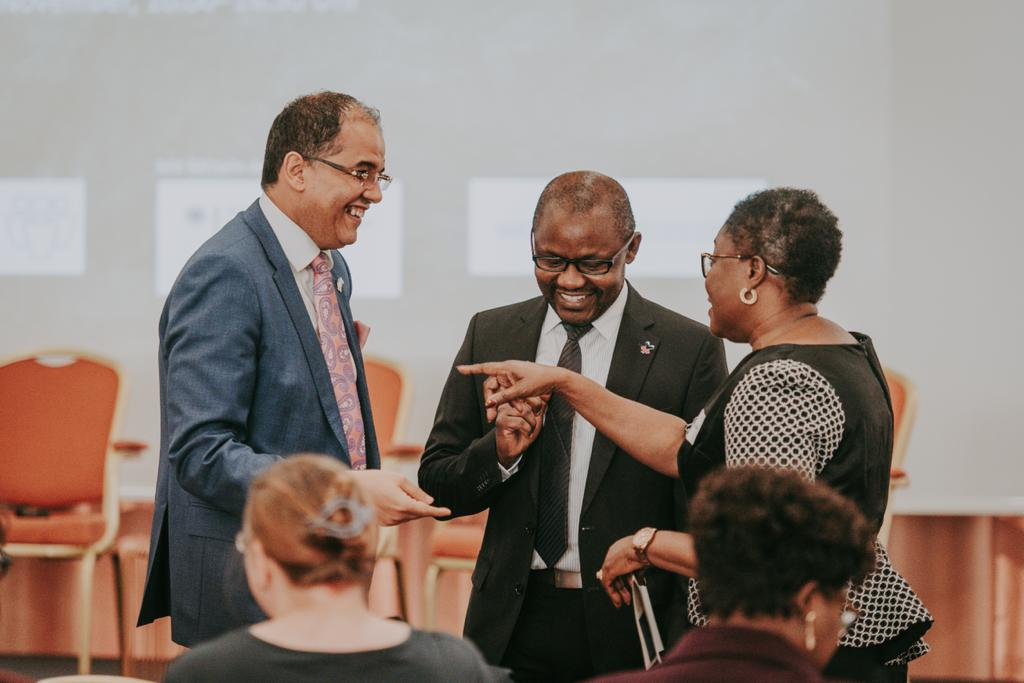
Alemazung in exchange with the ambassadors, Igor César of the republic of Rwanda to Germany and Ms Gina Ama Blay of the Republic of Ghana to Germany during the Agenda 5/17 Conference on the 4th of November 2019 in Munich.

Alemazung works as a freelance consultant on projects focusing on development politics, African politics, international relations, organisation development and intercultural training and sustainable development in local council administration.

In January 2020, prior to taking office, as Mayor of Heubach, Dr. Alemazung was seconded at the German Federal Ministry of Economic Cooperation and Development in Berlin, as a Senior Policy Officer. In this function he was responsible to state secretary, Norbert Barthle in his responsibility as personal commissioner of the German chancellor Dr. Angela Merkel at the German-Greek assembly (Deutsch-Griechische Versammlung (DGV), a network of Greek and German municipalities. In this cooperation Alemazung was responsible for the municipal cooperation between the two countries in the areas of economy, digitalisation, renewable energy, youth and culture, migration and refugees, sustainable tourism among other topics.

As a researcher and speaker on these topics, he has published many articles in journals. His first monograph came out in 2013 titled: State Constitutions and Governments without Essence in Post-Independence Africa: Governance along a Failure-Success Continuum with Illustrations from Benin, Cameroon and the DRC.

Alemazung served as managing editor of the Global Applied Sociology Journal, and as reviewer for the African Journal of Political Science and International Relations. He is a senior fellow and former chairman of the African Good Governance Network at DAAD.

As senior analyst at the Global Governance Institute (GGI) in Brussels he advises governments and state institutions on diverse governance issues. In 2012 he published a paper with the GGI titled: Government and the Process of Governance in Africa.

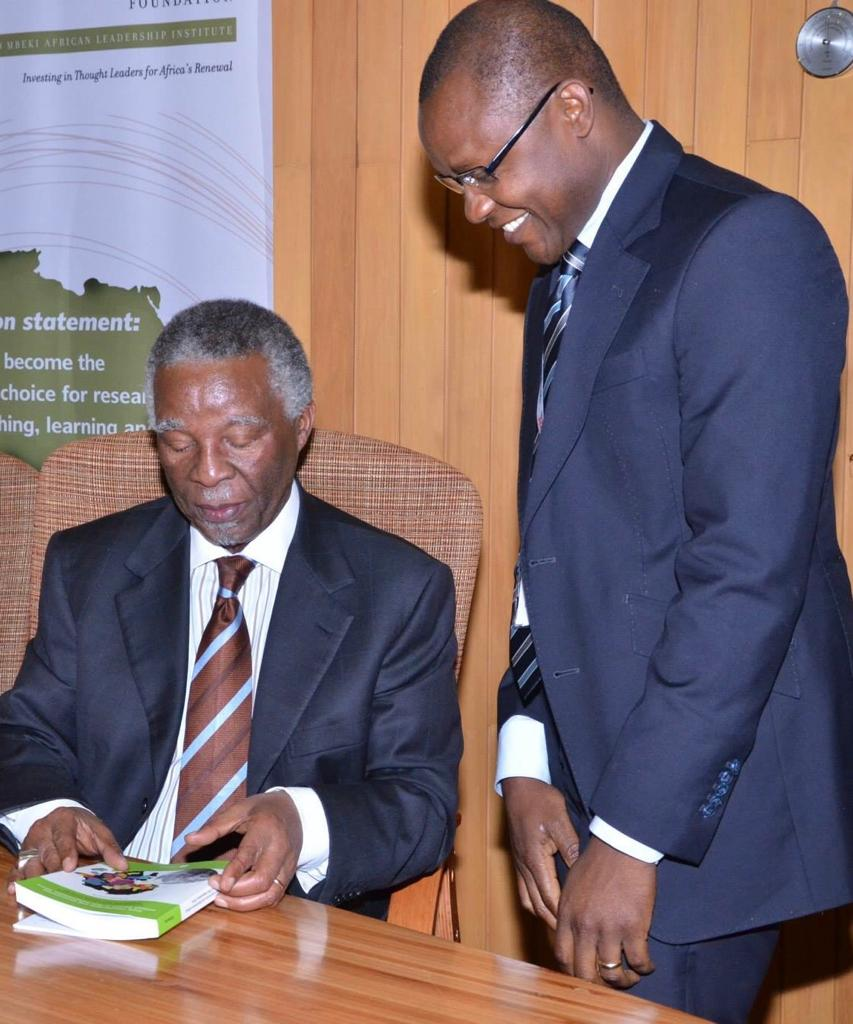
Alemazung presenting a copy of his book to president Thabo Mbeki

In August 2013, Alemazung was invited as guest speaker to attend the Thabo Mbeki African Leadership Institute Symposium, titled African Solution to Africa's Problem, where he presented a paper on Constitutional Democratic Government in Africa: Institutions Matter. During this visit, he seized the opportunity to discuss European-African economic and political relationships with President Thabo Mbeki.

== Politics ==
Alemazung officially joined the CDU party in September 2020 in Schwäbisch Gmünd. In July 2021 he was elected member of the executive committee of the CDU Ostalbkreis (Kreisverband Ostalb/Regional Association). During the CDU district convention in May 2022, he was elected CDU party delegate to the State (Landesparteitag) and Federal Party Convention (Bundesparteitag) of the CDU. On 25 August 2021, he applied for the office of the mayor of the city of Heubach. On 31 August, the local newspaper published his candidature with his first interview after his official application. His campaign slogan was: Gemeinsam Heubach Gestalten/Together we build Heubach, and his motto was: Führung ist das Privileg Menschen zu dienen und nicht das Recht über sie zu herrschen / Leadership is the privilege to serve and not the right to rule over the people. After months of intensive campaign with five other candidates, he won the elections with 66.24% of the votes in the first round.

His campaign was centered on a holistic approach to sustainable development at the local council level. He insisted that sustainable development in Heubach must include all dimensions of sustainability: social (people), ecology (nature) and economy. This campaign drew international attention, leading to an interview with international journalist, Ivana Dragicevic of N1 Television, a CNN affiliate for Adria Region Croatia.

The CDU Cabinet member of Angela Merkel's Grand Coalition government, federal minister, Julia Klöckner congratulated Alemazung on Twitter. At a time when the CDU suffered its worst election defeat since its creation, a black African CDU candidate was able to win an election against five other candidates with a landslide majority in the first round. His then minister at the federal ministry of economic cooperation and development and current Director General of the United Nations Industrial and Development Organisation, Dr Gerd Müller congratulated him in his office in Berlin.

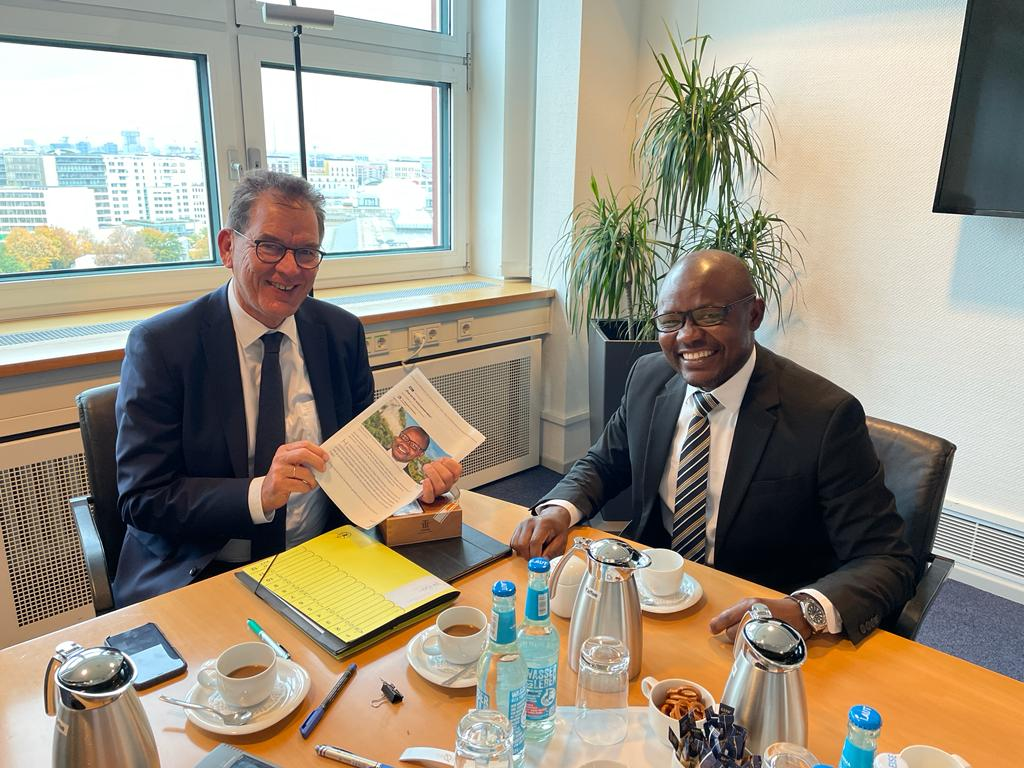
Dr. Gerd Müller, former German federal minister of economic cooperation and development congratulates Alemazung, 2021.

Local newspapers reporting on the electoral campaign had all forecasted a tight election which would only be decided in a second round. Many of the newspapers concluded that there was no way one of the six candidates could win the elections in the first round.

David Wagner from Gmünder Tagespost attributes Dr. Alemazung's success to his professional and administrative leadership skills and his capacity to articulate a clear vision for Heubach. Wagner also noted Alemazung's charisma, suggesting that many who have met him previously have found him impressive. His capacity to engage people, drive change, and elucidate council politics was seen as positive.

However, Wagner also cautioned that Dr. Alemazung's rhetoric, notably his reference to a "Campaign of Love", might not always translate into actionable policies in the long run. This commentary emphasizes the unpredictability of political environments and the continuous interest in the town's future direction.

On 15 December 2021, Alemazung was officially sworn into office and he took up his seat at the City Hall as the highest administrator of the city on 1 January 2022.

On the 27th of April Alemazung was elected Chairman of the Administrative community of Rosenstein composed of five municipalities: Bartholmä, Böbingen an der Rems, Heuchlingen, Mögglingen and Heubach.

== Voluntary services and engagements ==
From 2000 – 2005, he was founder and moderator of "Africa Panorama” at Radio Z Nuremberg. In 2002 he founded “Panafrikanischer Verein für Information und Humanitäre Dienste e.V. (from 2019: International Network for Governance and Sustainability). From 2009 – 2012 he was Parent Representative of the Freie Evangelische Bekenntnisschule reporting to the Zentraler Elternbeirat (Central Council of Parents Association) of Bremen and from 2012 – 2013 he was Chairman of African Good Governance Network, and between 2011 – 2013 he served as Executive Member of Africa ist auch in Bremen.

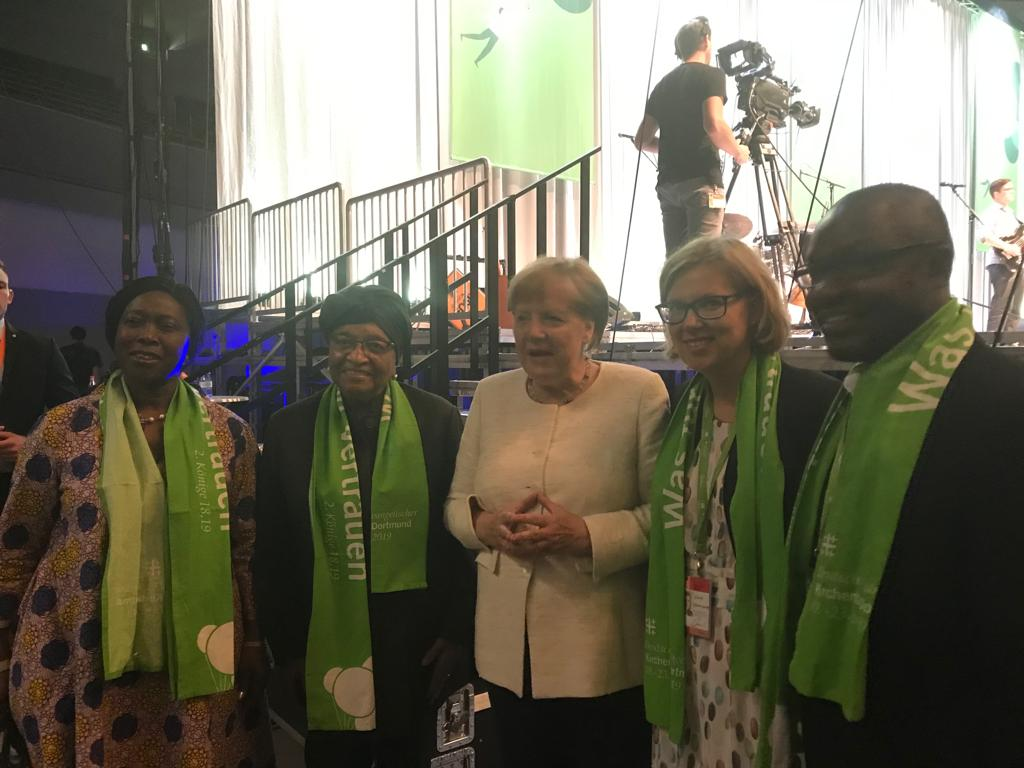
Alemazung with Chancellor Angela Merkel and President Sirleaf Johnson at the Kirchentag in Dortmund.
