= Heubach Telecommunication Tower =

Coordinates: 48°47′9″N 9°57′14″E

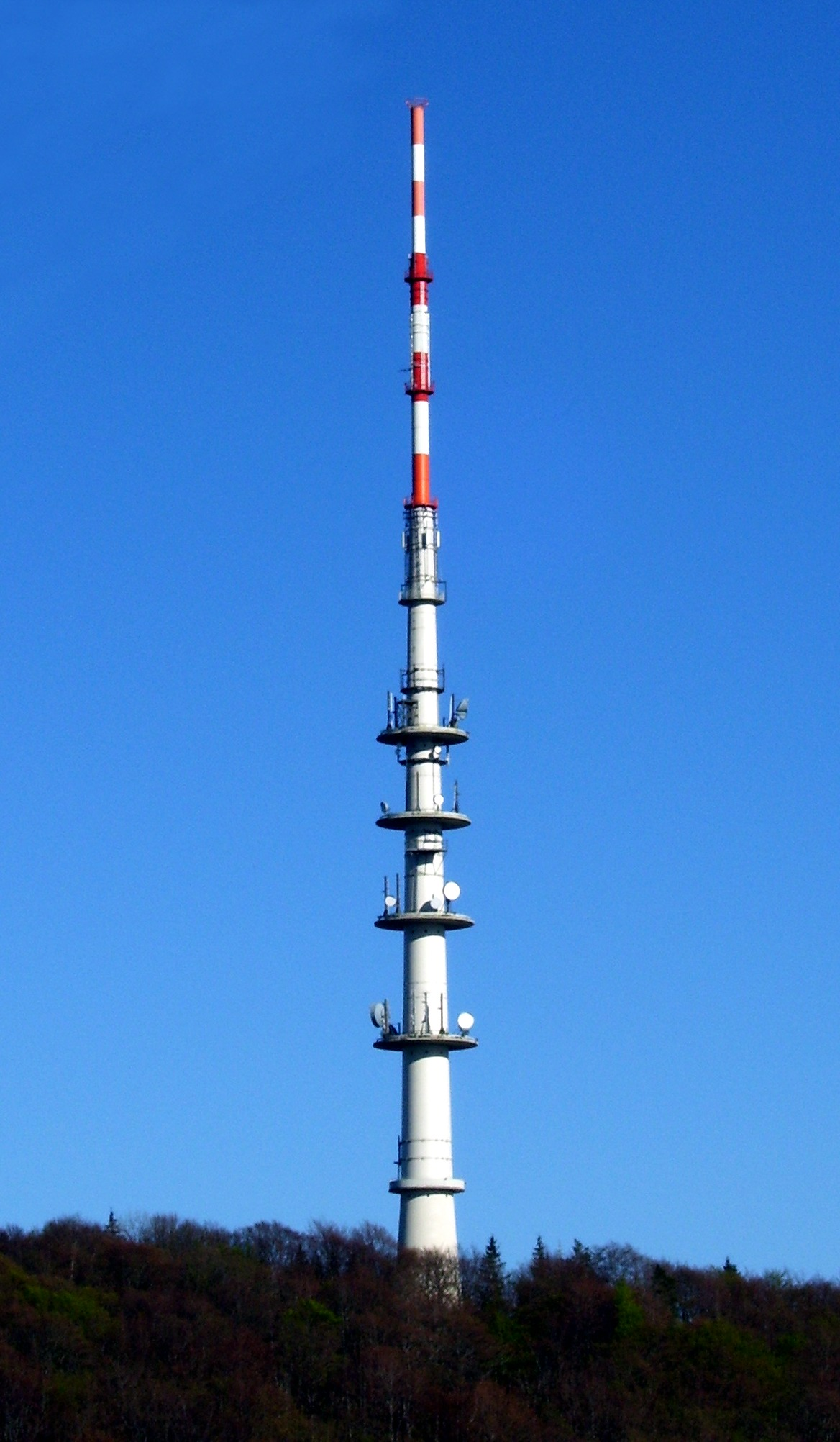
Heubach Telecommunication Tower

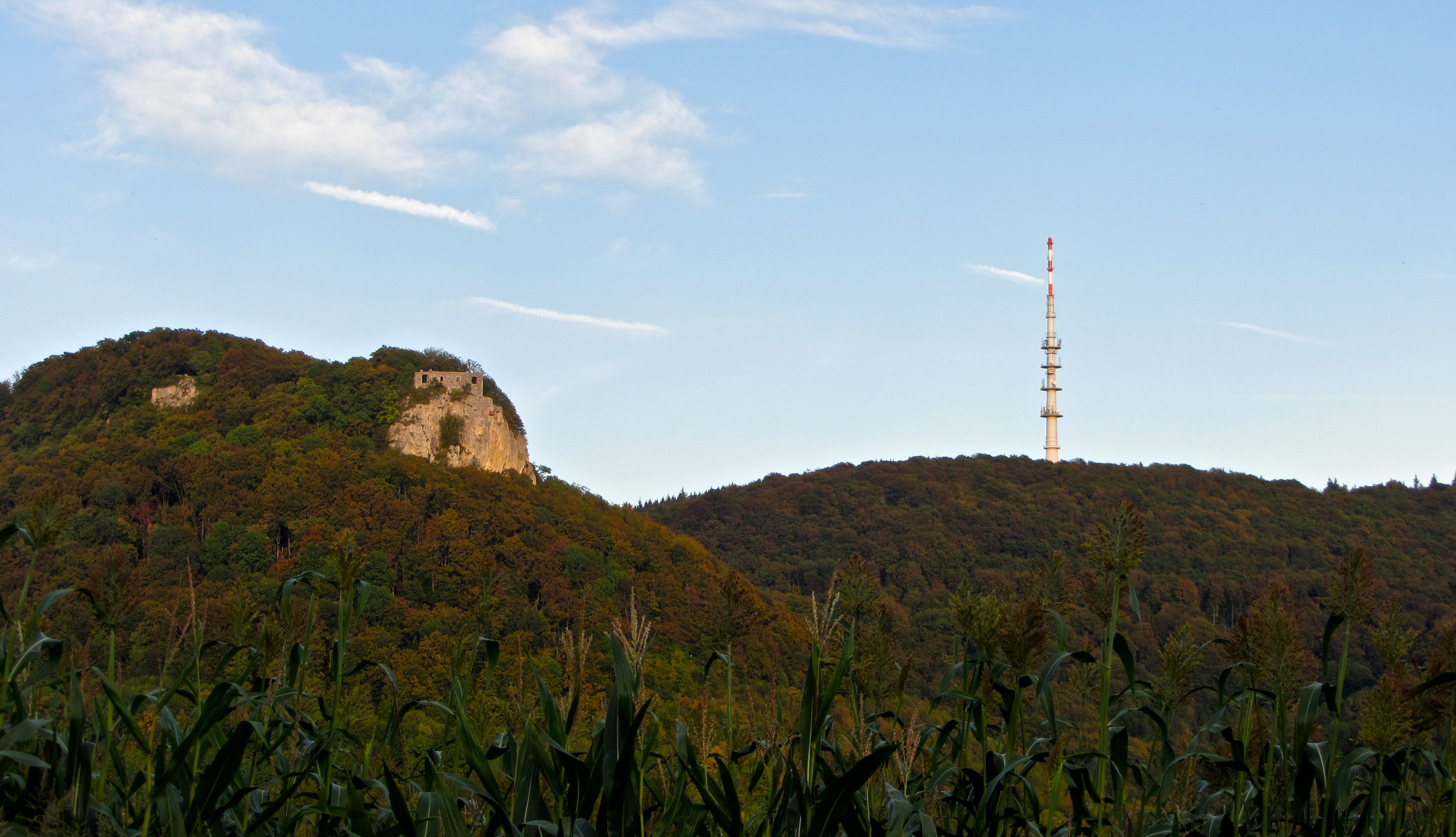
Heubach Telecommunication Tower and Rosenstein Ruins

Heubach Telecommunication Tower is a 162-metre-tall (531 ft) telecommunication tower of Deutsche Telekom AG on Glasenberg at Heubach in Baden-Württemberg. It is used for directional radio, mobile radio, police and fire brigade radio also used for FM- and TV transmission.

Heubach Telecommunication Tower is equipped with an observation deck in a height of 25 metres, which is accessible for tourists by a stairway with 139 steps. However this observation deck is only open at rare occasions.

== Radiated FM- and TV-programmes ==
TV-Program	Channel	ERP
ZDF	29	250,00 kW
SWR TV Baden-Württemberg	52	150,00 kW
FM-Program	Frequency	ERP
bigFM	105,1 MHz	0,32 kW

== See also ==
- List of towers
