= Triumph International =

Swiss underwear manufacturer founded in 1886 in Heubach, Germany

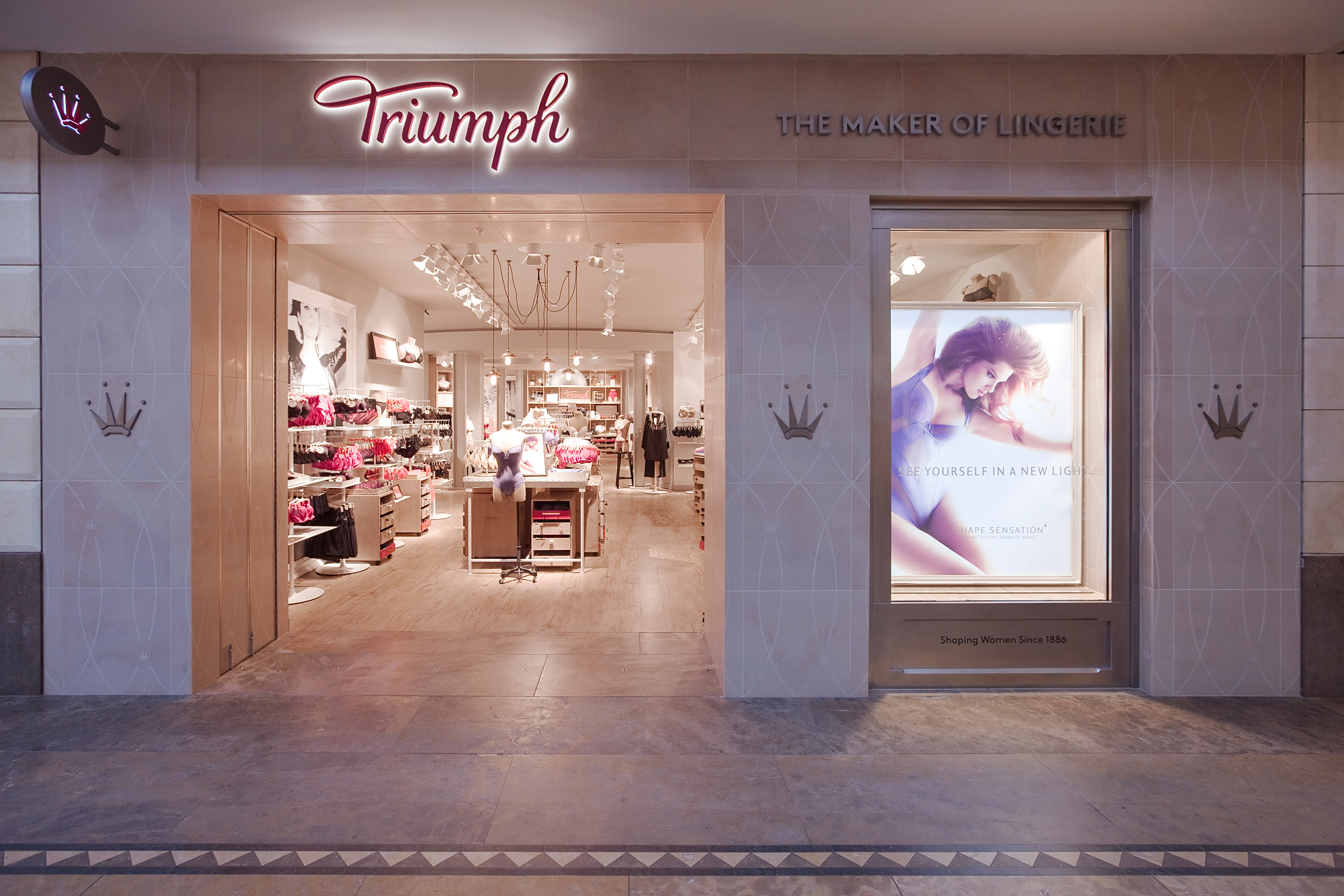
- Entrance to a Triumph store
- Type: Private
- Industry: Fashion
- Founded: 1886; 140 years ago
- Founder: Johann Gottfried Spiesshofer; Michael Braun
- Headquarters: Bad Zurzach (Aargau), Switzerland
- Number of locations: 2,000 stores
- Area served: Worldwide
- Key people: Markus Spiesshofer, Partner; Oliver Spiesshofer, Partner; Roman Braun, Partner
- Products: Lingerie, underwear
- Revenue: €1.437 billion
- Number of employees: 30,000
- Website: ch.triumph.com

Triumph International is a Swiss underwear manufacturer founded in 1886 in Heubach, Germany. The company's headquarters has been located in Bad Zurzach, Switzerland, since 1977, and it has branches in 45 countries. In addition to the Triumph brand, the company produces and distributes the products under the brands sloggi and AMO’s Style by Triumph.

Triumph International has been an industry leader, particularly in women's and sleepwear, since the 1960s. Shares of the German subsidiary have been traded on the stock exchange until 2011.

== History ==
Triumph logo used until 2013, although it has still been used in some countries

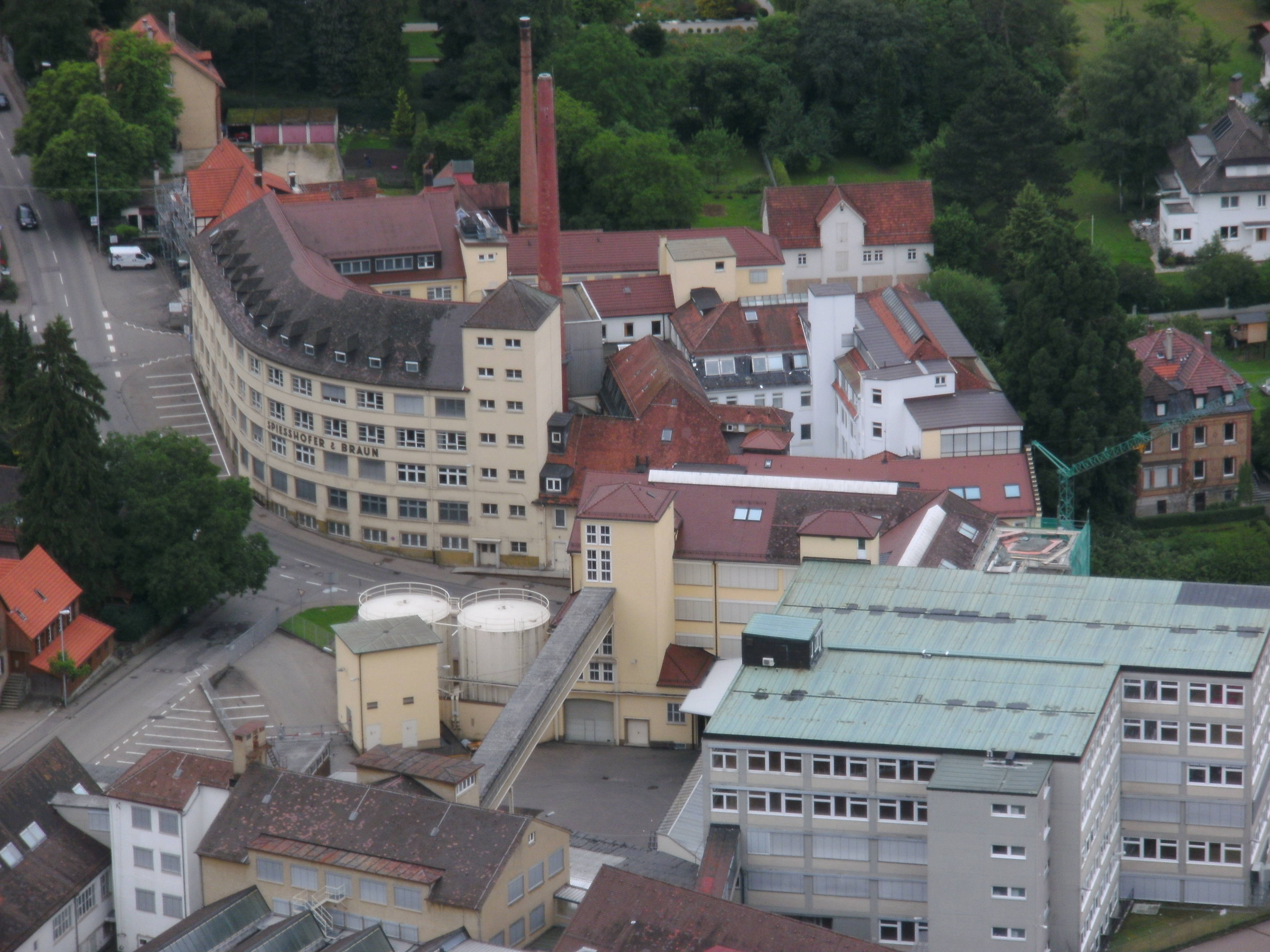
Corporate building in Heubach (2011)

In 1886, Johann Gottfried Spiesshofer and Michael Braun founded a factory for the production of corsets in Heubach (Baden-Württemberg). They first employed six people on the same number of sewing machines. That number rose to 150 people in 1890, and in 1894 their first exports were sent abroad, to England. It was only in 1902 that Spieshofer and Braun registered the Triumph brand, which was reminiscent of the Parisian Arc de Triomphe, to which International was later added. After the economic boom in the 1920s, demand for the classic corset declined, which is why the company began parallel production of brassieres. In the 1930s, Triumph International also began producing corselets.

In 1933, the first foreign branch was set up in Bad Zurzach (Switzerland). With the division of Germany in 1949, the Triumph International brand continued in the German Democratic Republic, but business activities there came to a virtual standstill. However, the internationalization of the company continued in the following period and beginning in the 1950s, offices were opened in Belgium, Great Britain, Sweden, Norway and Austria. Triumph International further expanded in 1960 by establishing its Asia-Pacific region headquarters in Hong Kong, and opening its first Japanese branch in 1963. At the time, observers already described it as a "cunning web" of companies, some of which were registered in the tax havens of Liechtenstein and Bermuda. In the late 1960s, Triumph International's market share for corsetry in Germany was about 50 percent.

At that time, the group had generated sales of 620 million Deutsche Mark and employed 22,600 employees. In the mid-1960s Triumph International introduced broad scale electronic data processing. Due to the economic crisis, the company encountered significant difficulties for the first time at the beginning of the 1970s, meaning the company even had to introduce short-term work. The crisis also affected the company’s tights sales, which they had begun in 1969 and discontinued only three years later. At the same time, Triumph International began for the first time to produce products from lighter fabrics with fibers such as nylon or lycra.

At the end of the 1970s, the new sloggi brand was introduced, under which underwear and other products with high cotton content were marketed. The company moved its headquarters from Germany to Switzerland in 1977, and its holding has since been headquartered in Bad Zurzach. By 1986, sales increased to 996 million Swiss francs and the number of employees fell slightly to 19,000 employees. At the same time, sales began in the People's Republic of China and beginning in 1988, individual Triumph products were manufactured under license in East Germany for the local market. This included swimwear in addition to underwear.

With the takeover of two French name brands, HOM and Valisère, Triumph International ventured into the men's underwear and high-quality lingerie market. At the same time, the company announced in 1995 that in the future it would focus more on its Triumph umbrella brand, under which a number of brands would be classified. To that end, an advertising campaign was launched featuring Naomi Campbell and Helena Christensen. In the 1990s, Triumph International launched another phase of international expansion, and since 1998 it has been present on the subcontinent of India. In 2001, its newest production facility opened in Dunaújváros (Hungary), which has been sold in the interim. After the turn of the millennium, Triumph was one of the biggest textile manufacturers in terms of sales in the domestic market.

From 2008 to 2012, the company hosted the Triumph Inspiration Awards, where lingerie designers were able to compete according to an annually changing theme. The entries were evaluated both by a jury and according to the votes by visitors to the competition website. In 2009, the competition attracted broader attention, particularly as that event was held in London. Initially a local competition was held in the participating countries prior to the international final competition.

Since 2012, all the collections of Triumph International have been tested for harmful substances and certified under the Oeko-tex standard for textiles, after individual products had been successfully tested as early as 1993 when the initiative was established.

In recent years, the company has expanded, opening new stores of its own and acquiring competitors. In 2010, Triumph International acquired Beldona, the leading Swiss distributor of lingerie, and later purchased other distributors in Mexico and the United States. The Triumph International AG, headquartered in Munich, under which the company's German business is associated, was once again fully acquired by the company in 2011 through the exclusion of minority shareholders; by now, it has been transformed into a GmbH (Triumph International GmbH). Since then, company stocks have no longer been traded on the Frankfurt Stock Exchange, and the company is wholly owned by the Braun and Spiesshofer families.

In 2017, Triumph made the decision to close its standalone stores in the United Kingdom, beginning to only sell online and through concessions in stores like Debenhams and House of Fraser.

== Brands ==
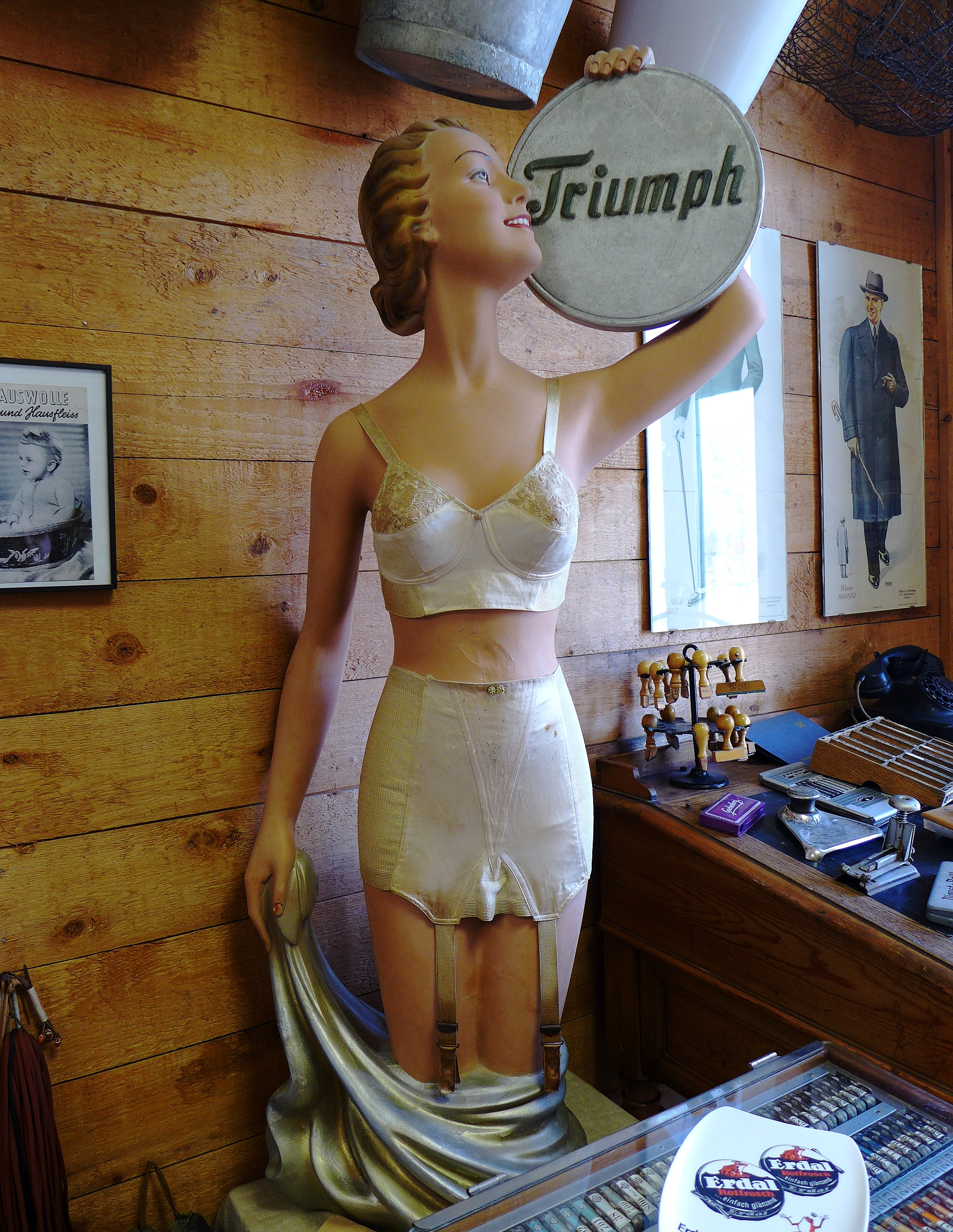
Triumph underwear from the 1950s

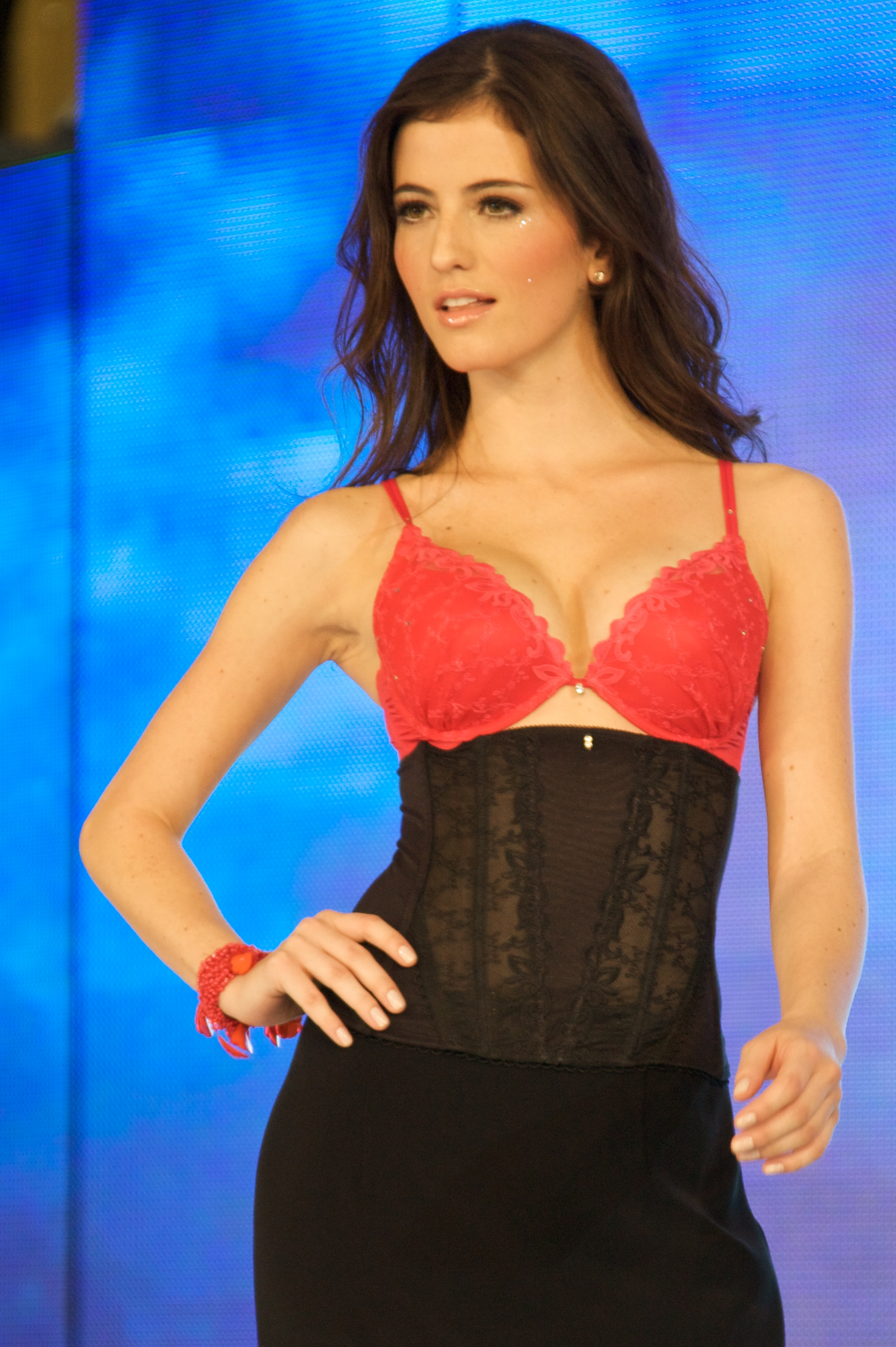
Triumph bra presented in 2009

The Triumph brand is the focus of the company. Products are divided into several categories for different target groups, with Triumph International typically presenting several collections each year. As of 2010, the importance of shapewear for the company increased, and Triumph's sale of these products attracted special attention. In 2013, Triumph was honored as one of the best brands. In 2015, the Magic Wire bra received the Red Dot Design Award; at the 2018 ISPO, the almost seamless "Seamless Motion Sports Bra" from Triaction by Triumph is awarded the ISPO Award in the Health & Fitness category. In 2019, consumers called up by the influential German trade magazine "Textilwirtschaft" vote Triumph to be the by far most popular body wear manufacturer brand.

In the late 1970s, Triumph International launched the sloggi cotton underwear brand, at first only for female customers and later also with products for men (sloggi Men) and swimwear (sloggi swim). Since the 1980s, Triumph International has also been targeting young customers aged up to 25 years old with the BeeDees brand. The products are characterized by accessories and patterned fabrics. In addition to sloggi and BeeDees, the company has also been marketing sports bras under Triaction since the late 1990s. In accordance with the company’s strategy to focus on its two global brands, Triumph and sloggi, the BeeDees brand was sold in 2017 to the Jansen Fashion Group (in Wesseling, Germany).

In the 1980s HOM, the French manufacturer of upscale underwear for men, was purchased and has since continued as a trademark within the company. The headquarters was located in Marseille. In early 2015, HOM was sold to the Austrian Huber Group, as Triumph wanted to streamline its portfolio. Valisère is the label for upper segment products, which beginning in 2007 became also available in Germany and was used primarily for luxury lingerie.

Triumph products are distributed both via trade partners and department stores, as well as in their own shops. By the end of 2017, the company had built a network of 3,600 controlled points of sale in 120 countries, which are operated by Triumph itself, by franchisees or run by other partners. In addition, Triumph serves 40,000 retail trade partners. The company is one of the largest lingerie retailers in Germany based on the number of branches. The largest branch in terms of retail space was opened in Dresden's Centrum Gallery in 2012; 2018 saw the opening of the store in Hamburg’s Jungfernstieg; other flagships stores are, for example, in Amsterdam, Berlin, and Copenhagen. In addition, Triumph International operates several online stores. These were developed using a fulfillment service provider that is part of Arvato.

== Criticism ==
In 2002, Triumph International had to close its factory in Myanmar due to public pressure. The Berne Declaration and Clean Clothes Campaign accused the company of renting land from the country's military regime and thus indirectly supporting it. In January 2002, Triumph International announced that it would close the affected factory and offer a social plan for the remaining employees because no buyer had been found. Moreover, Triumph International clarified that there had not been any forced laborers among the employees.

In October 2003, the self-regulatory body of the French advertising industry criticized Triumph International for a campaign for the sloggi brand. At the center of the protest was a picture of scantily clad women on billboards which advertised thongs under the slogan "It's String Time". It was claimed that the ads violated the dignity of women and harmed the public perception of advertising, but the company did not adjust the campaign. It was also criticized for the same reason by leading French politicians like Ségolène Royal.

In 2008, Triumph International came under fire after a female president of a local union was dismissed in Thailand. She had appeared on a Thai evening television program with a T-shirt on which a controversial political statement could be seen. The statement addressed the subject of a case of Lèse Majesté, a crime prosecuted with high prison sentences in Thailand and a highly sensitive issue in the Kingdom. The company's management had the view that the appearance had harmed their public image and therefore laid off the staff member in question. One of the company’s Thai work councils, Triumph International Labor Union, protested and collected 2,500 signatures to petition for the rehiring of the union president, supported in solidarity in Germany, inter alia, by the ver.di youth. In November 2008, the Labor Court in Bangkok found the lay-off to have been lawful.

Most recently, Triumph International has been the subject of even greater criticism after mass layoffs in Thailand and the Philippines at the end of 2009 were met with transnational protests by trade unions. The company regretted this step and made it clear that it was necessitated by the global economic crisis. Allegations that, parallel to the redundancies, another location was being set up in Thailand, were unfounded.

In 2014, the Japanese division of Triumph issued a voluntary recall on around 22,000 bras for an underwire fault. The recall applied to bras that were sold only in Japan. There have been no reports of injuries from the defect.
