= Australian Biathlon Association =

Sports governing body in Australia

Biathlon Australia
- Sport: Biathlon
- Category: National Governing Body
- Jurisdiction: Australia
- Abbreviation: BA
- Founded: 1970s
- Affiliation: International Biathlon Union, Australian Olympic Committee
- Regional affiliation: Australia
- Headquarters: Hotham Biathlon Arena, VIC Australia
- Location: Mount Hotham VIC Australia
- Chairperson: David Windsor
- Director: Murray Johnson, Sandra Willis, Brett Jones, Tristan Creed, Mark Bradford, Libby Maynard, Robin McEvoy, and Katerina Paul

Official website
- www.biathlonaustralia.com.au
- (Australia)

Biathlon Australia (formerly Australian Biathlon Association) is the national governing body that oversees the Winter Olympic sport of Biathlon in Australia, in both its winter and summer forms. It is affiliated with the International Biathlon Union and the Australian Olympic Committee. It is based at Mount Hotham, in Victoria, Australia.

== History and general information ==
The Australian Biathlon Association began in the 1970s as the North East Victoria Biathlon Association, it has remained the national governing body for the sport of biathlon in Australia, evolving to become the Victorian Biathlon Association, then the Australian/Victorian Biathlon Association in the early 1980s, and is now the Australian Biathlon Association, reflecting its membership base and unitary model of governance. More recently, Biathlon Australia has begun a unification with Biathlon East Australia allowing for a smoother run sport.

In 2016–2017, the ABA undertook the largest redevelopment of the Whiskey Flat range at Mount Hotham, to allow 15 lanes of participants at one time. The 15 lanes were ready for the 2017 Australian Winter season of biathlon, and at the Australian Biathlon Championships in August 2017, the range was officially named the Hotham Biathlon Arena, by Ms Danielle Green former MP, Parliamentary Secretary for Regional Victoria and Parliamentary Secretary for Tourism and Major Events. Biathlon upgrade to facilities was also undertaken in 2017 at SSAA Range in Wodonga and further upgrades to facilities have more recently taken place in NSW at the Perisher Laser Biathlon Range, the Anzac Rifle Range and Jindabyne Sport and Recreation Centre. These projects are part of the Victorian Government Shooting Sports Facilities Program and the NSW Government's Community Facilities upgrade projects. The upgrade to the Perisher Laser Range was funded by SportAUS.

Biathlon Australia together with a range of biathlon organisations in NSW, Victoria, ACT and QLD, are responsible for the development of biathlon at all levels in Australia, from grass roots to elite to Masters/Veterans. These activities range from laser biathlon for Under 12's to sending athletes to International Biathlon Union events during the IBU winter season, plus developing coaches through attendance at the IBU Coach Seminars each year, along with sending developing athletes and coaches to specialist IBU Development Camps each year.

== Biathlon Australia at the Olympics ==
Biathlon Australia's first athlete was Andrew Paul (Biathlete), Paul competed in the 1984 Winter Olympics in Sarajevo. 8 years later at the 1992 Winter Olympics, Sandra Paintin-Paul, and Kerryn Rim both became the first Australian female biathletes to compete at the Olympics. In 2006, Cameron Morton competed in Torino. In 2010 Alex Almoukouv went to the Vancouver Olympics, Almoukov competed alongside Lucy Glanville, in the 2014 Sochi Olympics

Australia's best performance in Biathlon was by Kerryn Rim in the 15km Individual (distance) race in 1994

== Winter Youth Olympic Games (WYOG) ==
Biathlon Australia has sent athletes to Winter Youth Olympic Games in every iteration since its beginning in 2012. The first Australian Youth Olympic Biathlete was Lachlan Porter in 2012, this was followed in the 2016 Games with Darcie Morton and Jethro Mahon. In 2020, Australia had record biathlon numbers, with three in both the boys' and girls', sending Isabella Moon, Lulu Minskin, Chelsey Johnson, David Patterson, Jonte Treasure, and Christian Mahon. The 2024 event saw another six Australian youth athletes compete, those being Phoenix Sparke, Ava Mcann, Alessandra Sydun-West, Edward Woodhouse-Bedak, Bridget Harvey, and Matthew Wilby.

== See also ==
- Biathlon
- Australia at the Winter Olympics
- Australian Sports Commission.
