= Johann Gottfried Spiesshofer =

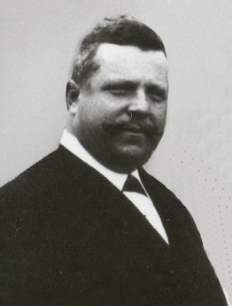
- Born: February 9, 1854; Heubach, Kingdom of Württemberg
- Died: March 31, 1917 (aged 63); Heubach, Württemberg, German Empire
- Occupations: Industrialist, Textile industry
- Known for: Founder of Triumph International
- Spouse: Anna Helene Barth
- Children: Anna Helena Braun, Maria Clara Simon, Otto Friedrich ("Fritz") Spiesshofer, Paul Alfred Spiesshofer, Thekla Else Simon
- Parent(s): Johann Gottfried Spiesshofer and Anna Veronika Spiesshofer

Johann Gottfried Spiesshofer (February 9, 1854 – March 31, 1917) was a German industrialist and pioneer of the undergarment industry. The son of a weaver, he was known for his outstanding expertise in weaving techniques. Together with merchant Michael Braun he established the corsetry manufacturer "Spiesshofer & Braun" in Heubach (Württemberg) in 1886. From 1902 onwards the company traded under the name "Triumph" as this was considered a more memorable brand name. Having started off with six sewing machines and six employees in a barn, the company had annual sales of 1.7 billion Euros in 2009, and 37,515 employees. Still family owned, by now the multinational manufacturing and marketing organization operates in 120 countries around the globe. It is one of the leading underwear companies in the world and sells its product primarily under the core brands Triumph® and sloggi®.

Johann Gottfried Spiesshofer was married to Anna Helene Barth. They had five children.
