= Michael Braun (industrialist) =

German textiles industrialist (1866–1954)

Johann Michael Braun
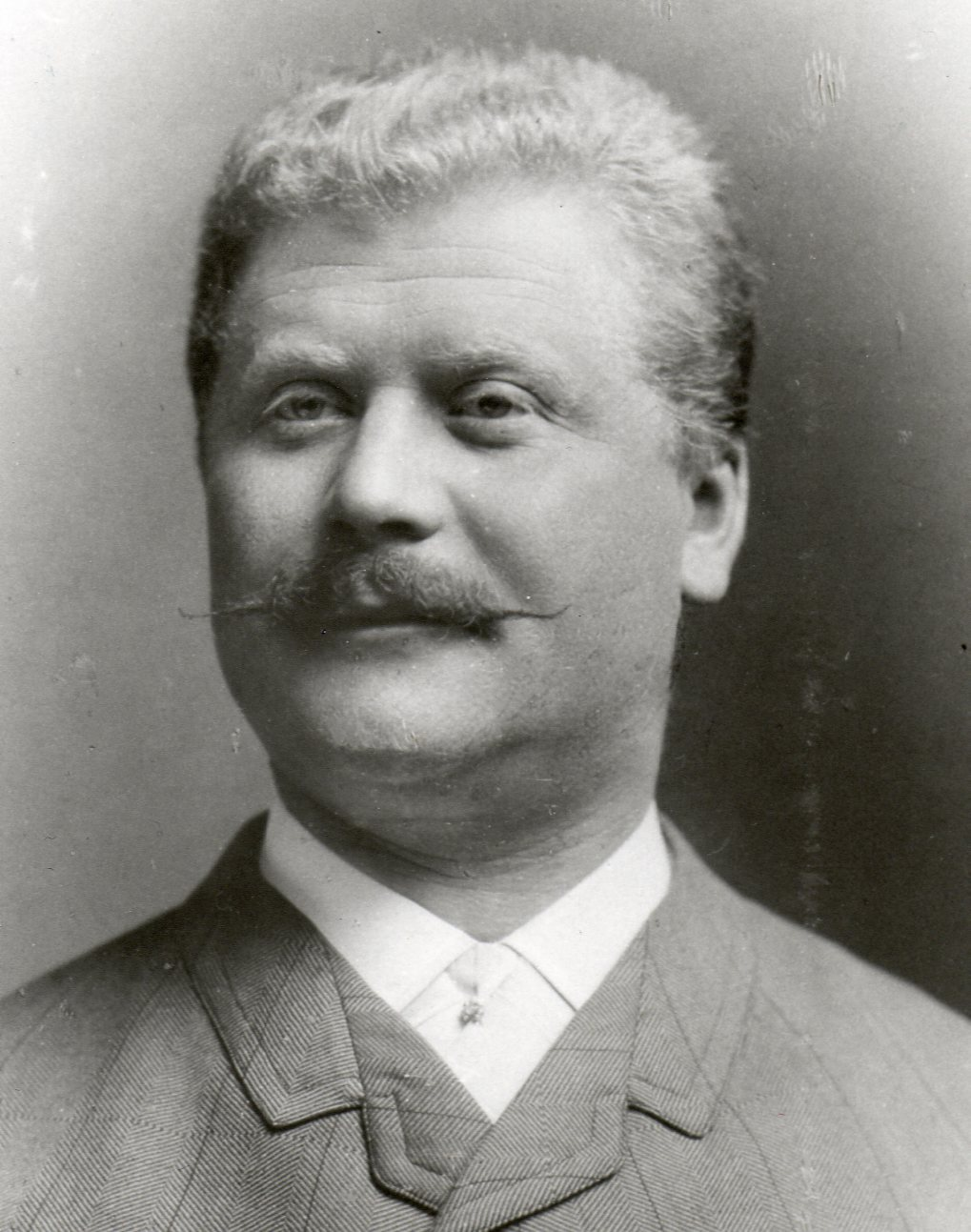
- Born: 5 August 1866; Heubach, Kingdom of Württemberg
- Died: 21 July 1954 (aged 87); Heubach, West Germany
- Occupation(s): Industrialist, Textile industry
- Known for: Founder of Triumph International
- Spouse: Anna Helena Spiesshofer
- Children: 4
- Awards: Commander's Cross

Johann Michael Braun (5 August 1866 – 21 July 1954) was a German industrialist and pioneer of the undergarment industry. Together with corsetmaker Johann Gottfried Spiesshofer he established the corsetry manufacturer “Spiesshofer & Braun” in Heubach (Württemberg) in 1886. From 1902 onwards the company traded under the name “Triumph” as this was considered a more memorable brand name. Having started off with six sewing machines and six employees in a barn, the company had annual sales of 1.7 billion Euros in 2009, and 37’515 employees. Still family owned, by now the multinational manufacturing and marketing organization operates in 120 countries around the globe. It is one of the leading underwear companies in the world and sells its product primarily under the core brands Triumph® and sloggi®.

Michael Braun was married to Anna Helena Spiesshofer, daughter of co-founder Johann Gottfried Spiesshofer. They had four children.

In memory of Michael Braun and his wife, every year on 29 October church bells of Heubach’s St.-Ulrich Church ring as Michael and Helena Braun once donated the bells.

== Honors ==
- Großes Verdienstkreuz der Bundesrepublik Deutschland (Commander's Cross of the Federal Republic of Germany)
- Honorary citizen of Heubach (Württemberg)
