= IPSC Armenia =

Sporting Organization in Armenia

- IPSC Հայաստան
- Headquarters: Yerevan
- Location: Davtashen, 2nd District
- President: Artyom Gevorgyan
- Parent organization: International Practical Shooting Confederation

IPSC Armenia (Armenian: IPSC Հայաստան), also known as the Practical Shooting Federation of Armenia (Armenian: Հայաստանի գործնական հրաձգության ֆեդերացիա) is the governing body for practical shooting in Armenia. Its headquarters are located in Yerevan.

== History ==
Artyom Gorgyan is the current president of the Federation. The Federation is a full member of the International Practical Shooting Confederation, within the "European Zone".

== Activities ==
In August 2015, the Federation organized the "You Can Defend Yourself" program in collaboration with the Japan Karate Association of Armenia, in which disabled persons were provided with shooting lessons and martial arts training.

The Federation hosts various shooting tournaments in Armenia. On 24 December 2018, the Federation held the "Pan-Armenian Sniper Shooting Tournament" in coordination with the Ministry of Defence of Armenia. The participants were mostly from law enforcement agencies of Armenia and Artsakh, as well as civilian snipers. The former Minister of Defence, David Tonoyan, was in attendance.

== See also ==
- Armenian Shooting Federation
