= German Ski Association =

Sports governing body in Germany

- Official logo
- Abbreviation: DSV
- Formation: 1905
- Headquarters: Planegg, Bavaria
- President: Franz Steinle
- Parent organization: International Ski and Snowboard Federation (FIS)
- Website: www.deutscherskiverband.de

The German Ski Association (German: Deutscher Skiverband or DSV) is the national governing body for skiing in Germany. The organisation was founded in 1905 among local ski clubs. The German Ski Association represents international interests of the German skiing and trains athletes and trainers. The DSV headquarters are located in Planegg, south of Munich. Current DSV president is Franz Steinle.

== Divisions ==
The DSV represents these sports:

- Competitive sport:
  - Alpine skiing
  - Biathlon
  - Cross-country skiing
  - Freestyle skiing
  - Nordic combined
  - Skicross
  - Ski jumping
  - Telemark skiing
- Popular sport:
  - Nordic Walking
  - Ski Inline
  - Tourenwesen

== See also ==
- Ski Jumping in Degenfeld
