= Rosenstein (Swabian Jura) =

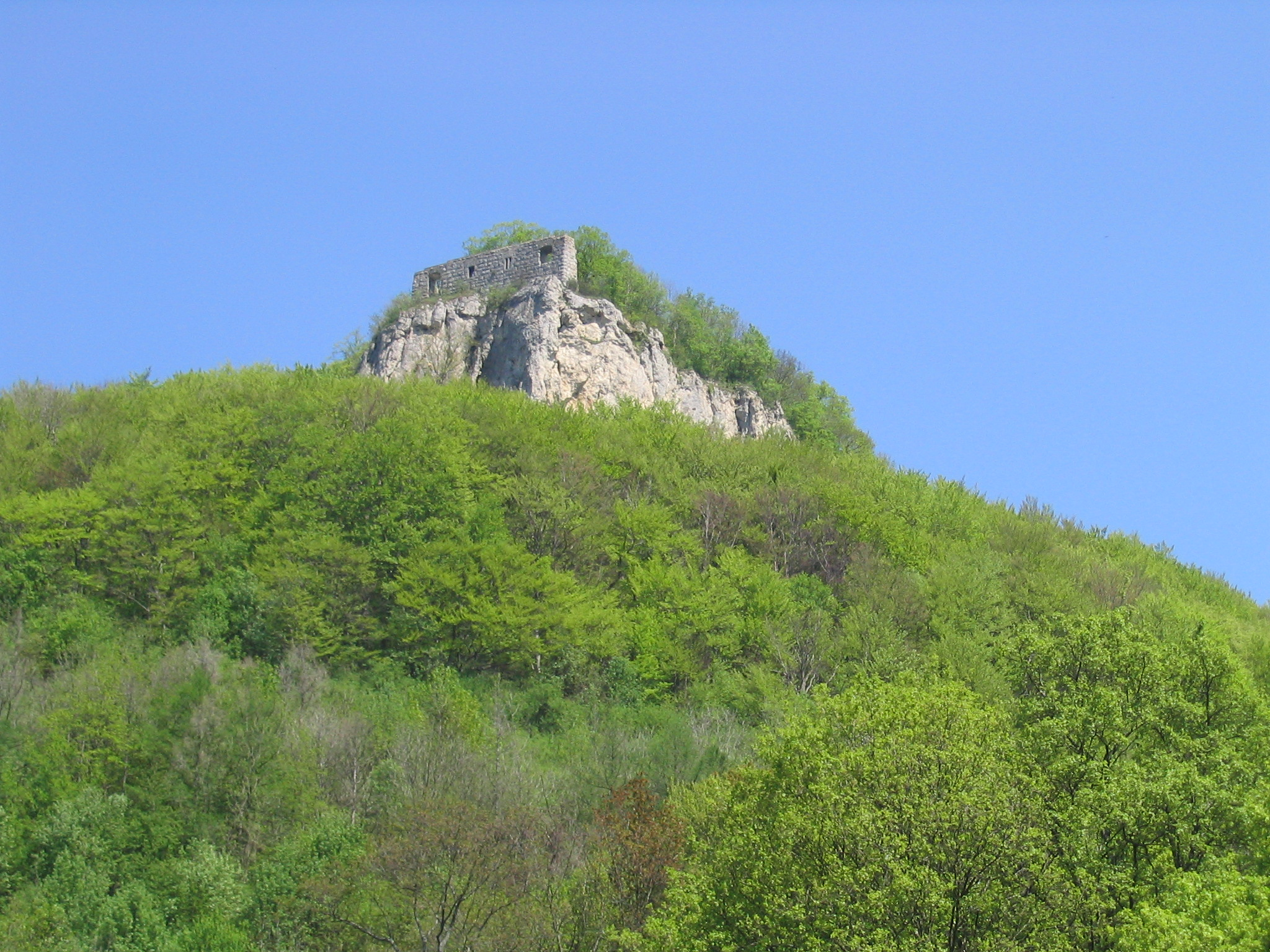
- Rosenstein Mountain

Highest point
- Elevation: 735 m (2,411 ft)
- Coordinates: 48°47′47″N 9°57′37″E

Geography
- Location within Baden-Württemberg
- Location: Baden-Wuerttemberg, Germany
- Parent range: Swabian Jura

The Rosenstein is a 735 m high mountain in the Swabian Jura (German: Schwäbische Alb) above the town of Heubach near Schwäbisch Gmünd, Germany.

With its exposed position as head of the Alb it had been of strategic importance. Excavations in the caves on Rosenstein have found tools dating back to the Paleolithic period. Among the best-known caves are scouring the "Great" and "Dark hole". About the Western rock, the remnants of a medieval castle, Rosenstein castle ruins.

The Rosenstein is now a very popular recreational area, especially for climbers and mountain bikers.

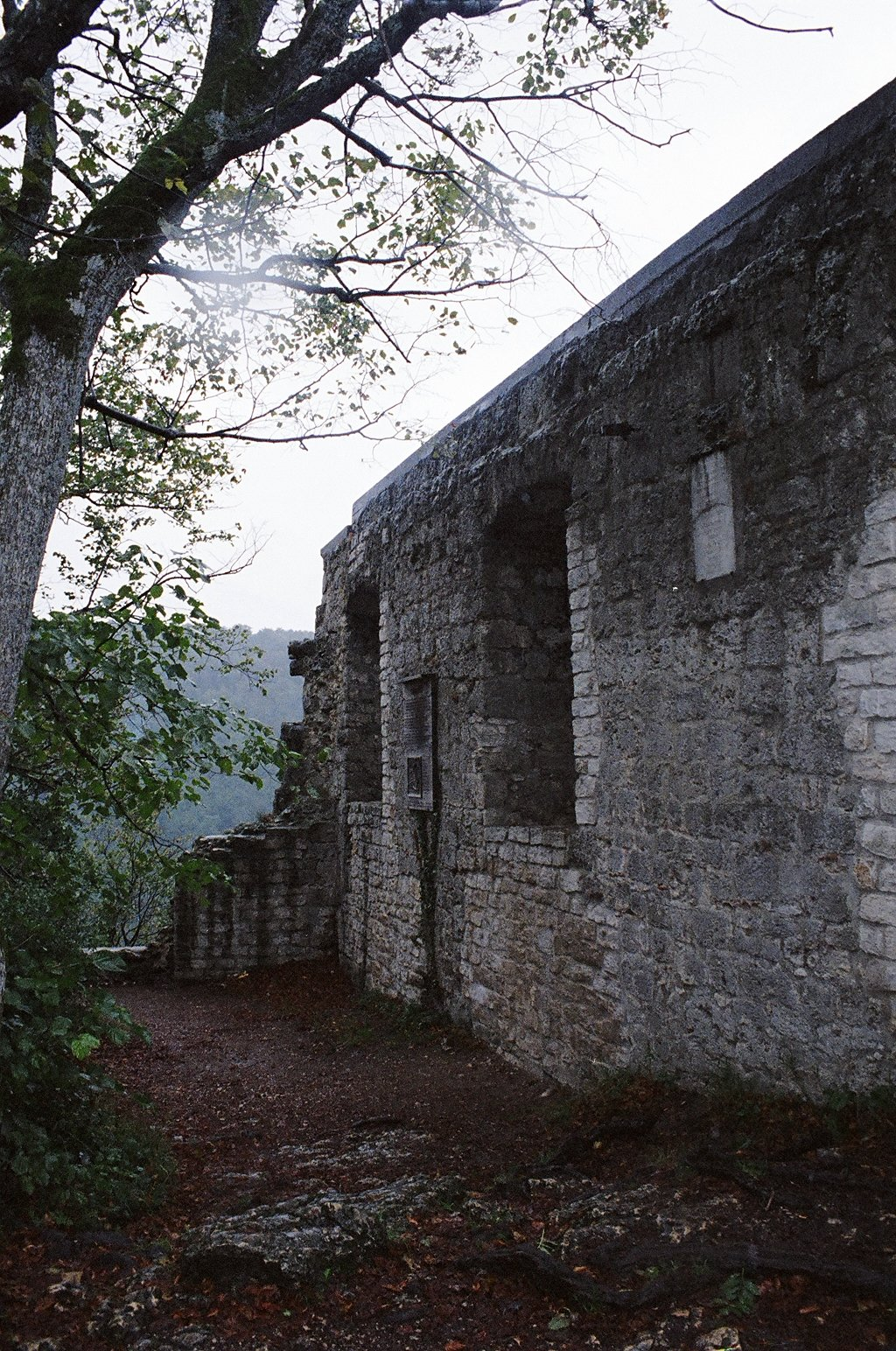
Rosenstein Ruins

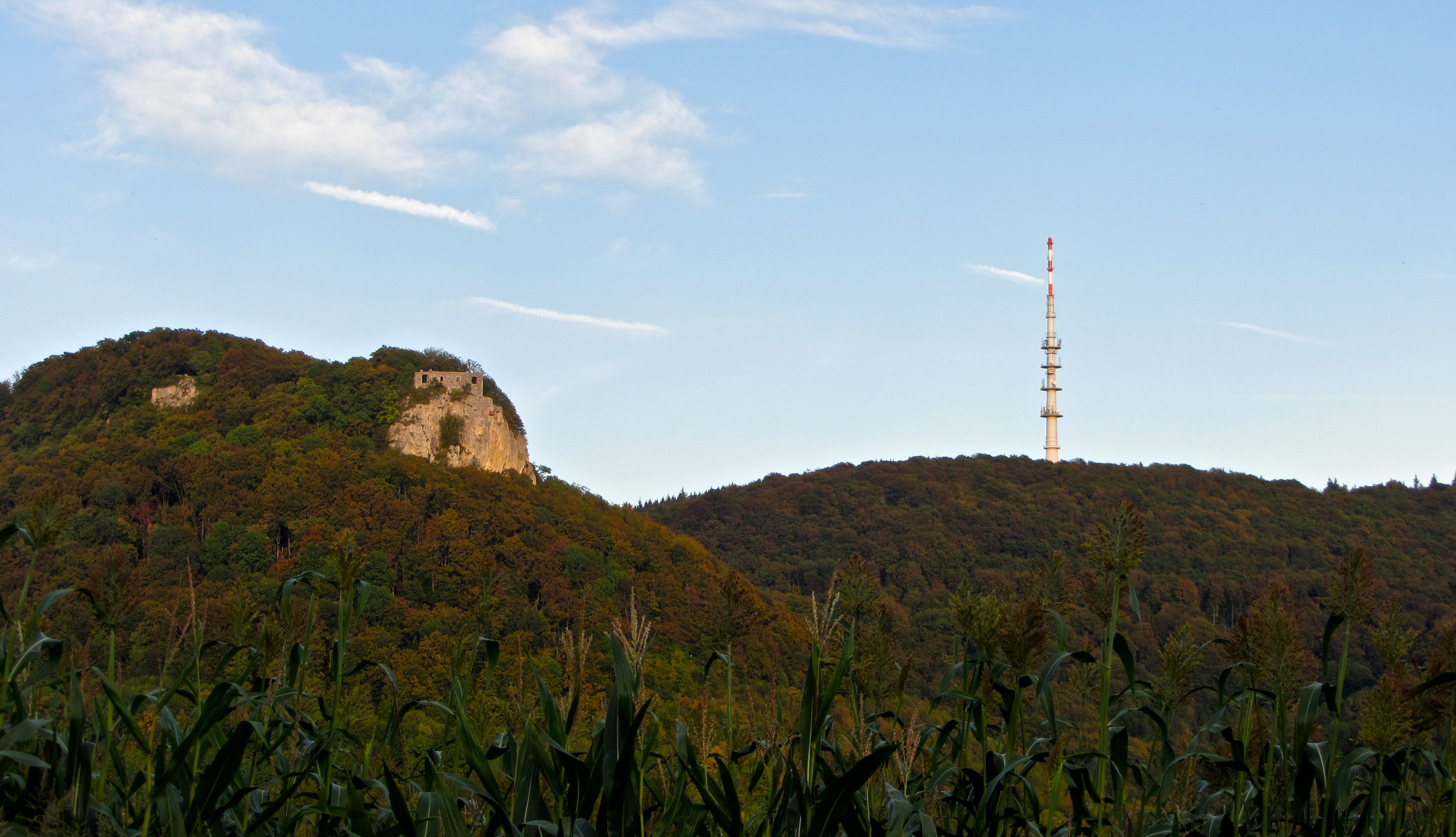
Rosenstein Ruins and Telecommunication Tower

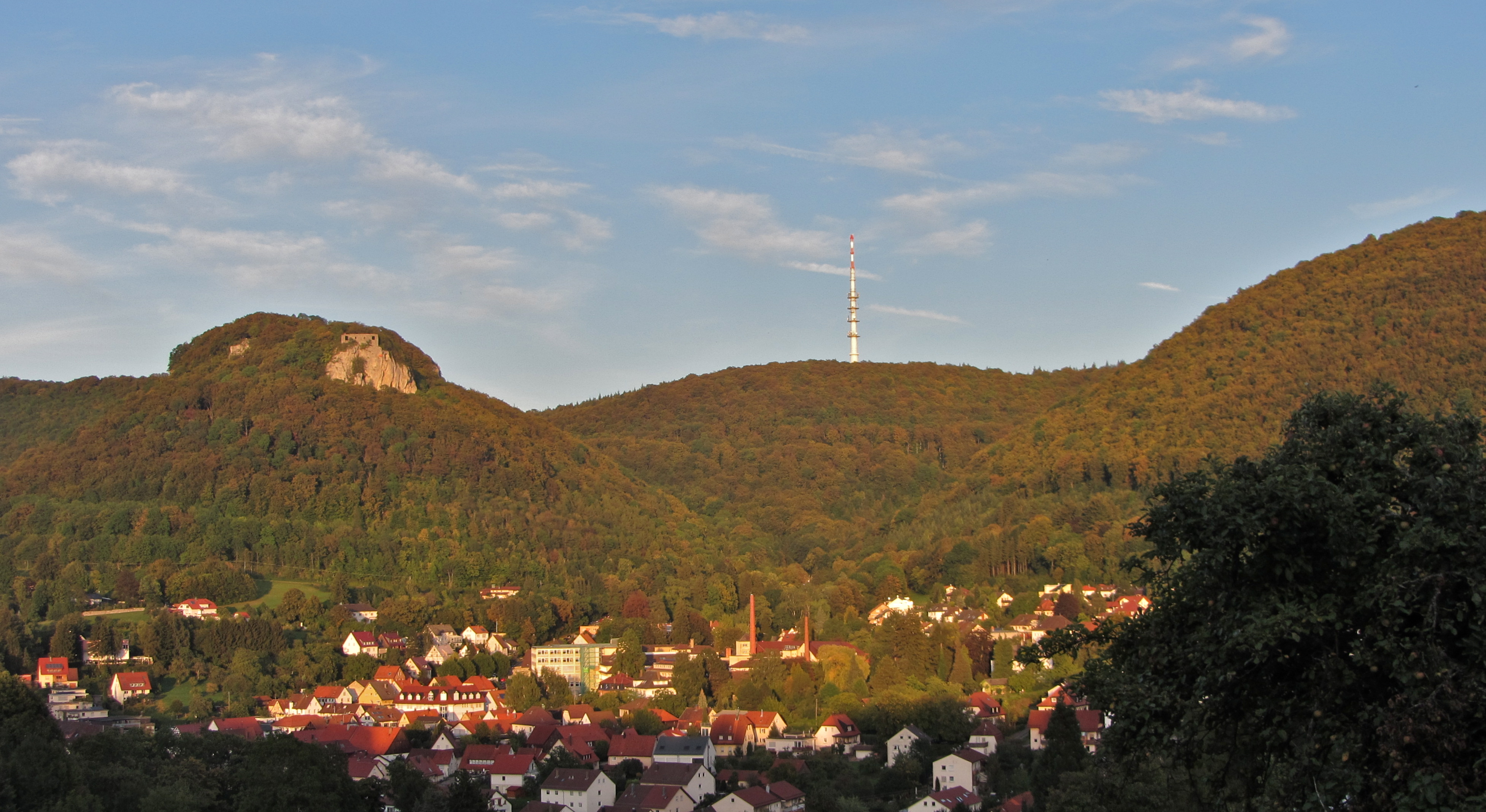
Rosenstein Ruins above Heubach

== See also ==
- Petrosomatoglyph
