= Heubach =

- Town
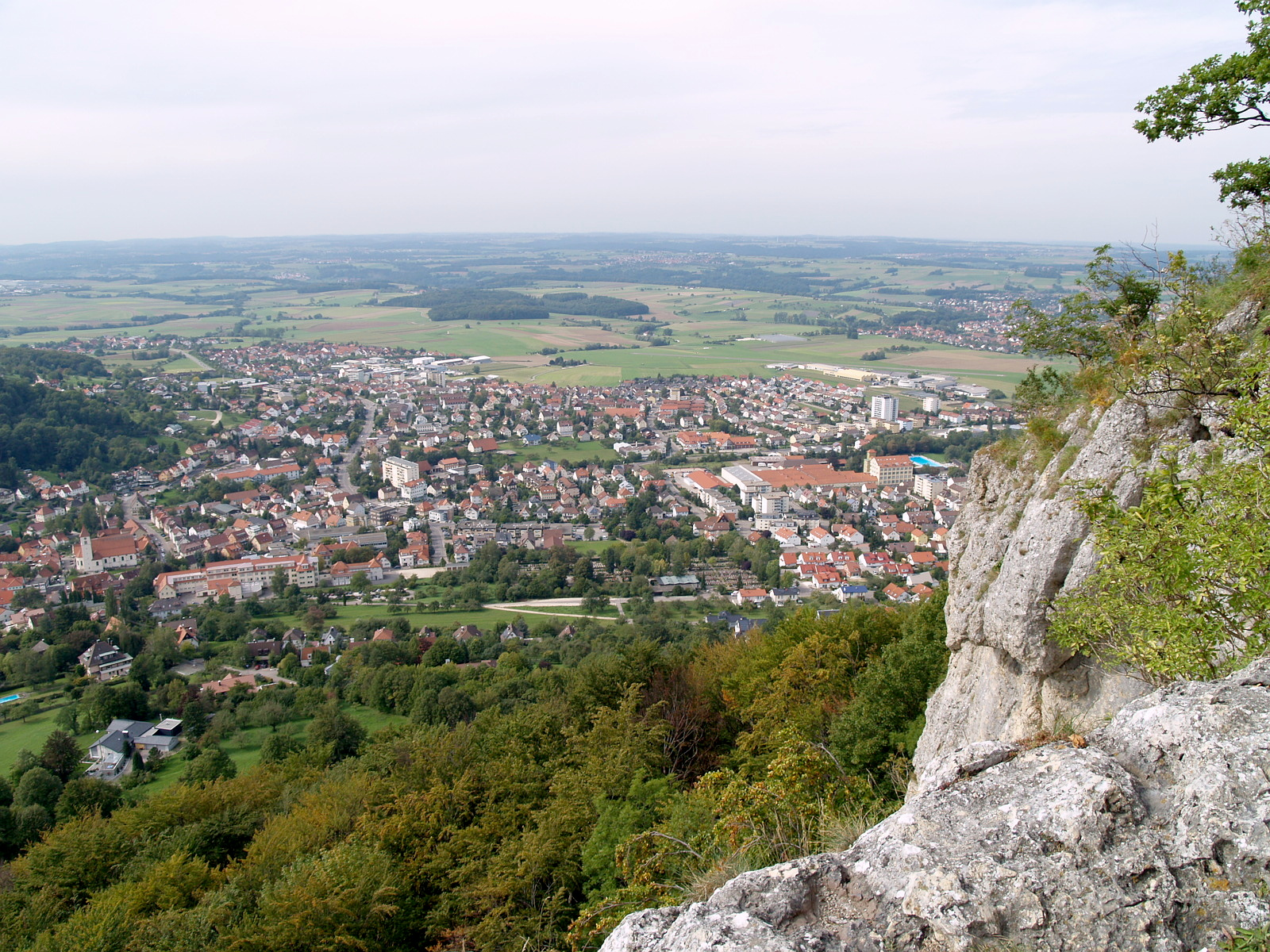
- Heubach seen from Rosenstein

- Coat of arms

- Location of Heubach within Ostalbkreis district
- Interactive map of Heubach
- Location within Germany Location within Baden-Württemberg
- Coordinates: 48°47′17″N 09°56′00″E
- Country: Germany
- State: Baden-Württemberg
- Admin. region: Stuttgart
- District: Ostalbkreis
- Subdivisions: 2 Stadtteile

Government
  - Mayor (2021–29): Joy Alemazung (CDU)

Area
  - Total: 25.78 km^{2} (9.95 sq mi)
- Elevation: 466 m (1,529 ft)

Population (2025-12-31)
  - Total: 10,241
  - Density: 397.2/km^{2} (1,029/sq mi)
- Time zone: UTC+01:00 (CET)
  - Summer (DST): UTC+02:00 (CEST)
- Postal codes: 73540
- Dialling codes: 07173
- Vehicle registration: AA
- Website: www.heubach.de

Heubach (German pronunciation: [ˈhɔʏbax]) is a town in the Ostalbkreis district, in Baden-Württemberg, Germany. It is located 10 km east of Schwäbisch Gmünd, and 13 km southwest of Aalen. The town finds itself at the edge of the Rems River Valley and at the base of the Swabian Alps. Heubach is located in the Swabian region of Germany. Residents speak the Swabian German dialect. The town is bordered to the north by Böbingen an der Rems and Mögglingen, to the east Essingen, the south by Bartholomä and the west by the city of Schwäbisch Gmünd.

== History ==
Heubach was first mentioned in 1234 in association with knight Hainricus de Hôbach. Rosenstein Castle, which is located on Rosenstein mountain, was first mentioned in 1282. At the end of the 13th century, Heubach and Rosenstein came into the possession of the Counts of Oettingen, before falling to the Counts of Württemberg in 1358. Subsequent to the victory of Emperor Charles IV over Eberhard II, Count of Würtemberg, in 1360 Heubach and Rosenstein fell to the Kingdom of Bohemia. However it was transferred back to Württemberg in 1377. In 1413 Heubach was enfeoffed to the Barons of Woellwarth fiefdom. Georg von Woellwarth left the spur castle on Rosenstein mountain in 1524 and built a castle in Heubach. In 1579 Duke Ludwig von Wuerttemberg purchased Heubach and Rosenstein and chartered Heubach by granting town privileges. The town hall was built in 1581. In the course of the Thirty Years' War between 1618 and 1648, Heubach was nearly wiped out and the population fell to around 10 people, but due to efforts of Württemberg's government it was rapidly rebuilt and resettled. On April 25, 1807 Oberamt Heubach was merged with Oberamt Gmünd. With the municipal reform of 1938 Oberamt Gmünd was transformed into Landkreis (district) Schwäbisch Gmünd. In the course of the district reform of 1973, Heubach now belongs to the Ostalbkreis district.

Above the town of Heubach, the remains of Rosenstein Castle are still visible. The castle ruin on top of the Rosenstein mountain can be considered Heubach's landmark and is a popular tourist spot due to its impressive views over the region. On Glasenberg there is a telecommunication tower of reinforced concrete with an observation deck that also gives nice views over the area.

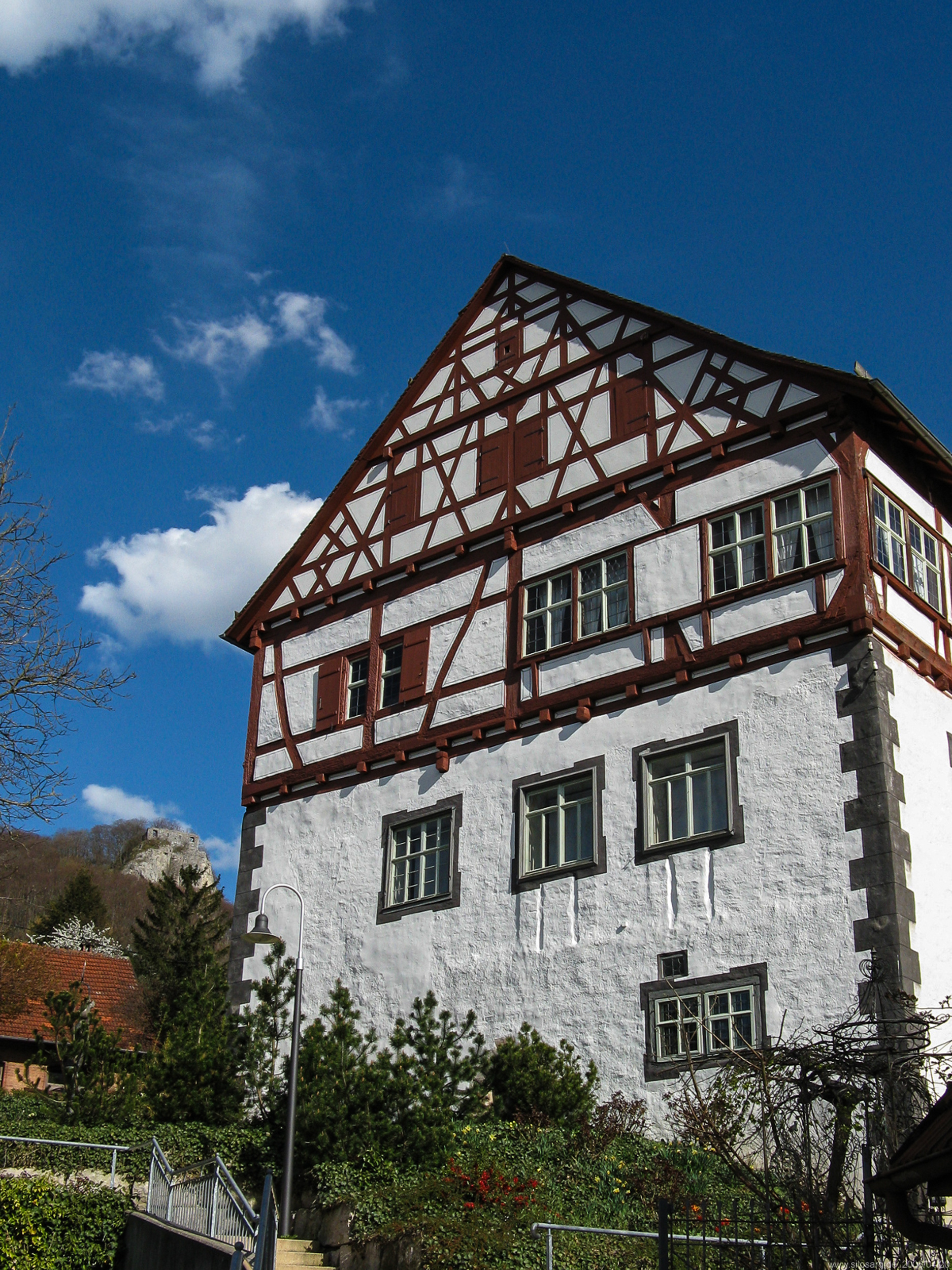
Heubach castle

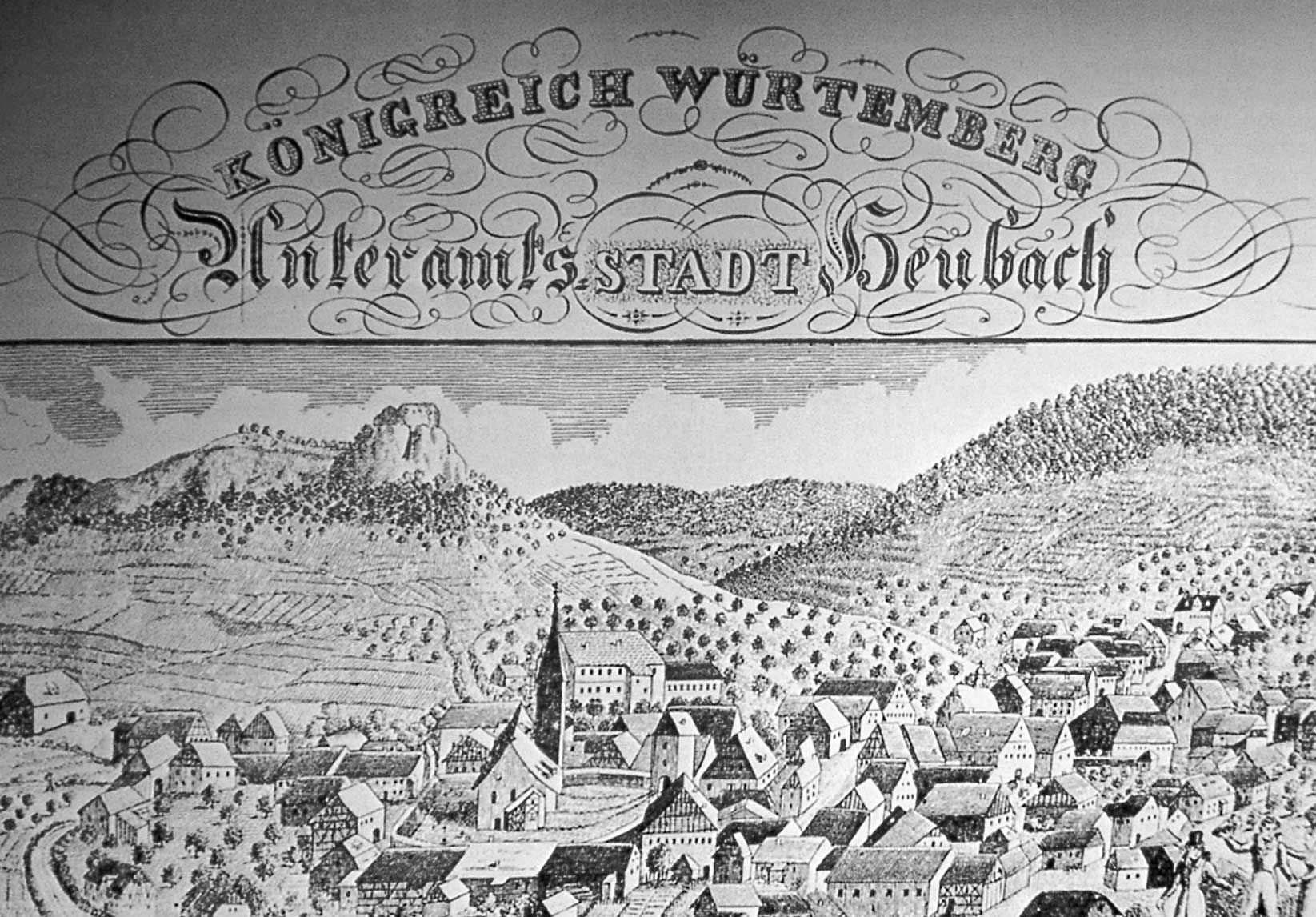
Heubach in 1830

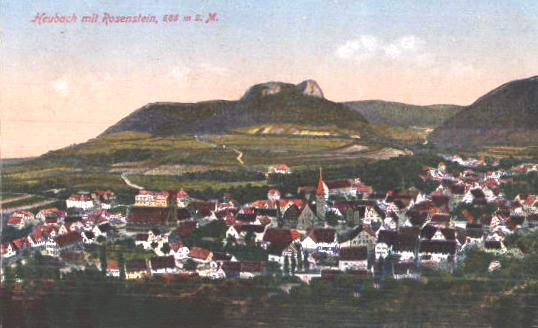
Heubach and Rosenstein abt. 1900

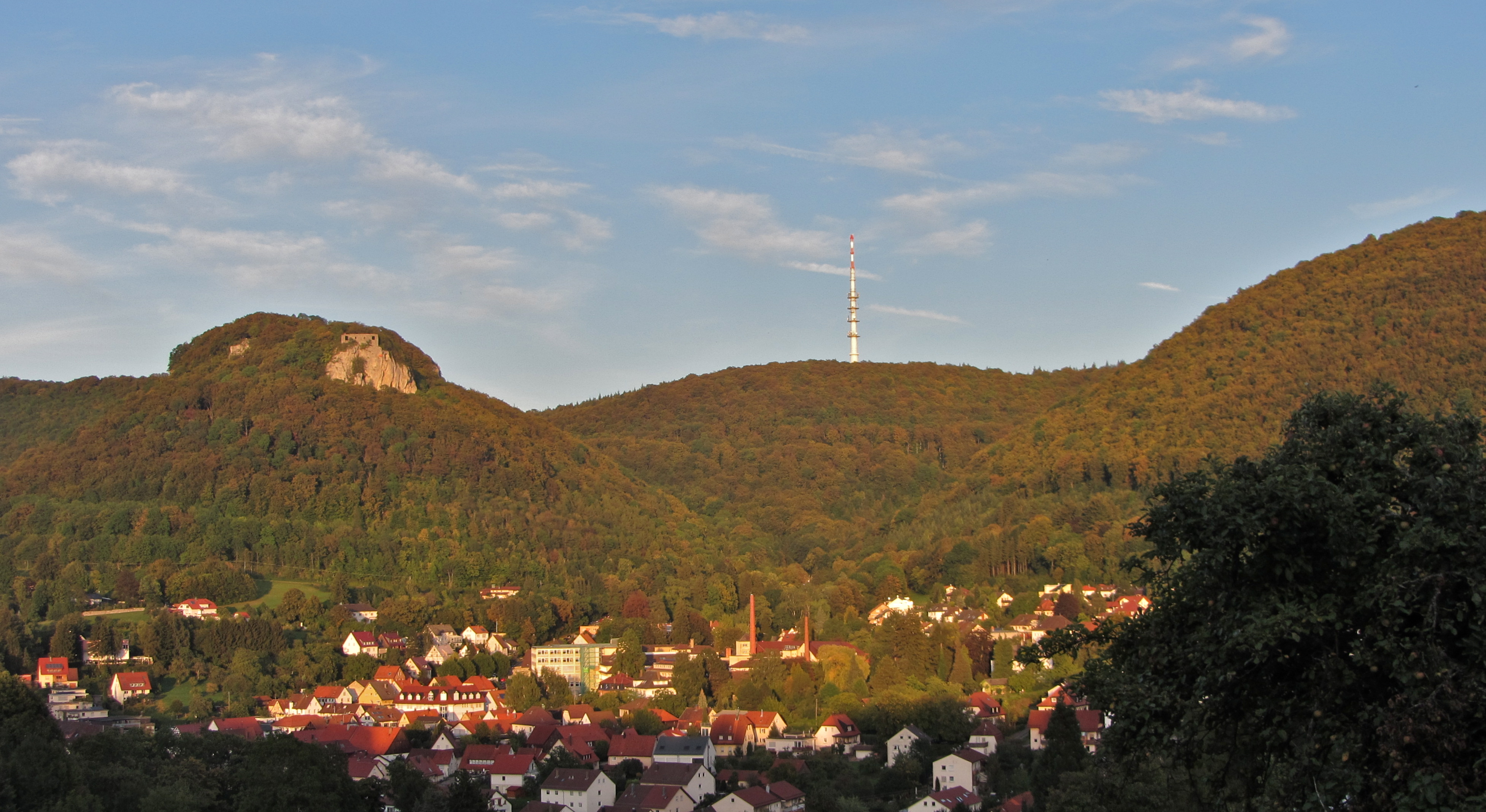
Heubach and Rosenstein

== Arts and Culture ==
Heubach is located on the north edge of the Swabian Alb scenic drive, Schwäbische-Alb-Nordrand-Weg that provides many sights of the German countryside.

== Museums ==
Since 1974 there is an undergarment museum that was set up in cooperation with the companies Triumph and Susa-Werke GmbH, which is the only museum of its kind in Germany.

At Heubach's police station there is a "Police Museum", which originated from a private collection of a police officer. There, items from the local police are displayed that date back to 1853. The museum opens by appointment only.

=== Religion ===
In addition to a Protestant and a Roman Catholic church there is also a Baptist and Jehovah's Witnesses congregation.

== Mayors ==
In 2011 the jurist Frederick Brütting was elected to be the successor of Klaus Maier (* 1956). Maier was in office from 1986 to 2011. Brütting started his office time on January 1, 2012 and was elected as mayor of Aalen in 2021. Joy A. Alemazung was elected in 2021 and is mayor since 2022.

- 1986–2011: Klaus Maier (SPD)
- 2012–2021: Frederick Brütting (SPD)
- since 2022: Joy A. Alemazung (CDU)

== Politics ==
Heubach is the seat of the Rosenstein municipal association. The municipalities of Bartholomä, Böbingen an der Rems, Heuchlingen, and Mögglingen are members.

== Twin towns – sister cities ==
Heubach is twinned with:

- Laxou, France, since 1964
- Waidhofen an der Thaya, Austria, since 1982
- Lauscha, Germany, since 1990

== Business ==
The intimate apparel business Triumph International was started by corsetier Johann Gottfried Spiesshofer and merchant Michael Braun as Spießhofer & Braun in Heubach in 1886. Still family owned, by now the multinational manufacturing and marketing organization operates in 120 countries around the world. It is one of the leading underwear manufacturers in the world and had annual sales of 1.7 billion Euros in 2009, and 37,515 employees. Still being resident in Heubach, meanwhile the company's global headquarters are in Bad Zurzach, Switzerland, where the first foreign subsidiary had been established in 1933.

Closely linked to the history of Heubach is the evolvement of Hirschbrauerei Heubach, the long-established local brewery. Still family owned the brewery's history goes back to the 17th century, first documented proofs go back to 1725.

Heubach is the home of Fritz Reu GmbH & Co. Metallwarenfabrik, maker of metal souvenirs, souvenir spoons, keychains, trinkets, coins, and also automobile medallions and hood ornaments for German car manufacturers.

== Famous People ==
- Michael Braun (1866–1954), Honorary citizen for his achievements as entrepreneur and co-founder of Spießhofer & Braun, now Triumph International
- Fritz Spießhofer (1886–1968), Honorary citizen for his achievements as entrepreneur
- Johann Gottfried Spießhofer (1854–1917), German industrialist and co-founder of Spießhofer & Braun, now Triumph International

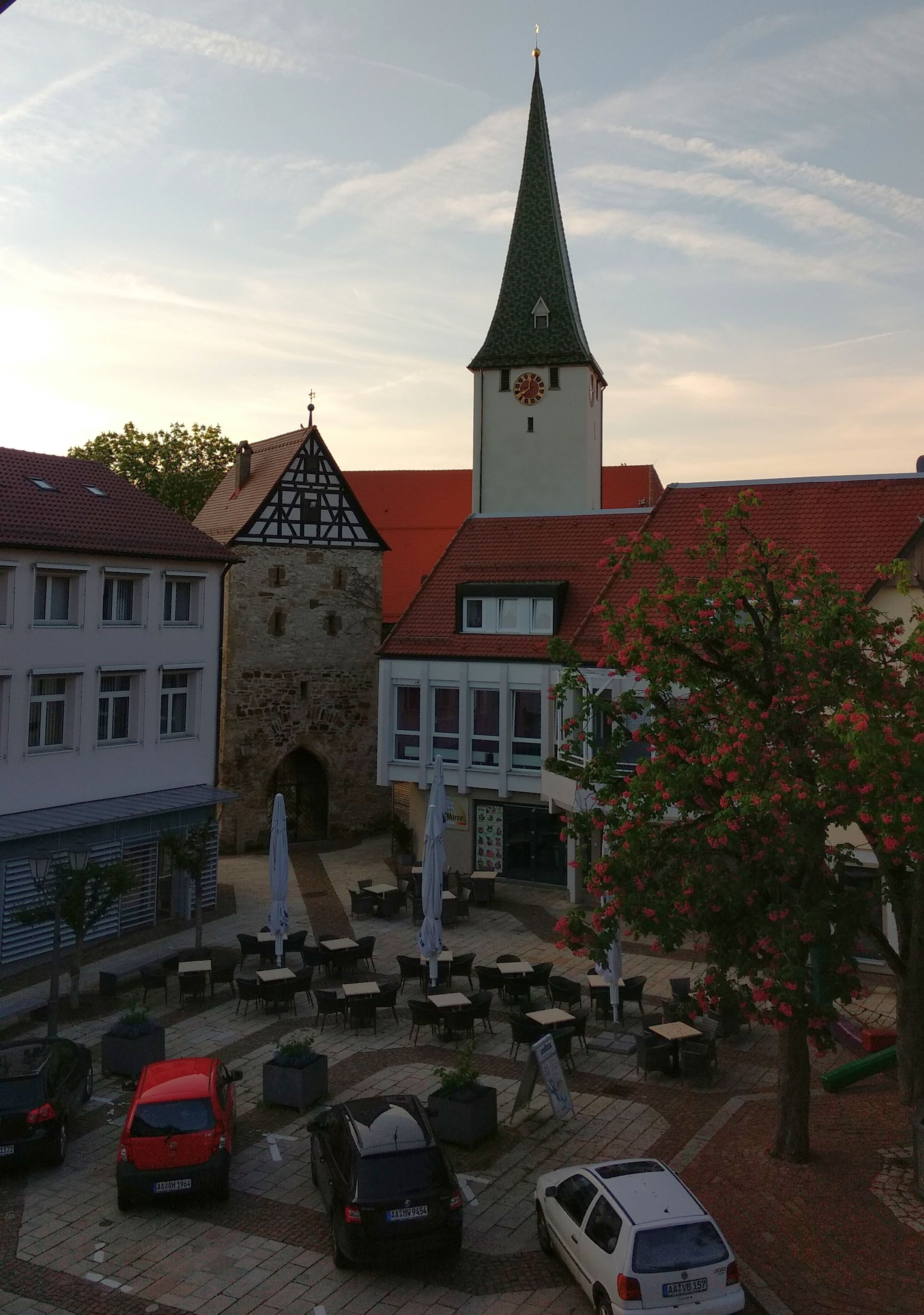
St. Ulrich and "Blockturm"

== Other ==
A nickname for the citizens of Heubach is "Mondstupfler". This goes back to an ancient legend which says that long time ago residents of Heubach used to go up to the top of Rosenstein mountain to take down the moon from the sky using long poles.

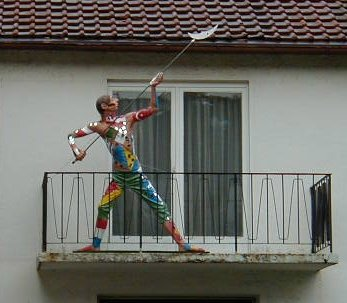
Mondstupfler
