= Karin Nordmeyer =

German human rights- and gender equality activist

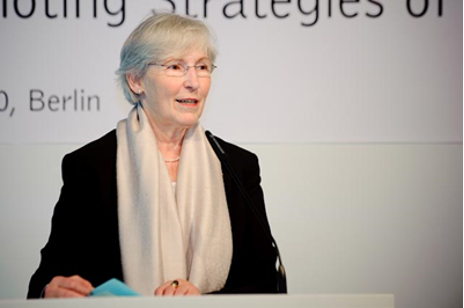
Karin Nordmeyer

Karin Nordmeyer (née Oppen; born July 30, 1941, in Willmannsdorf) is a German human rights- and gender equality activist. For many years, up to April 2021, she was the chairwoman of the registered society UN Women National Committee Germany (UN Women Germany). In 2017, Nordmeyer received the Order of Merit of the Federal Republic of Germany.

== Early life ==
In her early childhood, Nordmeyer lived at her parents’ farm Gut Willmannsdorf, in the district of Jauer in Lower Silesia. After her family fled and became displaced, she was raised in Göttingen, where she obtained her high school diploma in 1961.

Nordmeyer started her studies in violin, viola and teaching music in 1962 at the Musikakademie Detmold, Staatliche Hochschule für Musik. After her first state examination for teaching music in high schools in 1965, she continued her studies for viola in the masterclass of Ulrich Koch at the Hochschule für Musik Freiburg. At the same time she studied musicology. She wrote her first state examination in musicology in 1970 at the University of Tübingen. After her teacher training at Studienseminar Tübingen she finished her studies with the second examination in 1971. Nordmeyer was a music teacher until 2000 at high schools in Freiburg.

== Political activities ==
From 1984 up to 1987 Nordmeyer was an assessor in the committee for conscientious objection in Freiburg. From 1986 to 1995 she served in the parish council and engaged in welfare work of the St. Peter Protestant Parish of Reconciliation in Kirchzarten-Stegen.

Nordmeyer became an active member of Zonta International in 1970 and held different positions in this organization. Between 2000 and 2002 Nordmeyer held the position of Governor of Zonta District 30. From 2004 to 2006 she was member of the International Nominating Committee, and from 2006 to 2008 she served as a director member of the International Board. Nordmeyer represented Zonta International between 1992 and 2016 at the Council of Europe as an expert for gender policy, and she was the chairwoman of the internationally staffed Council of Europe Committee for more than 10 years.

She was spokeswoman of the International NGO Conference (INGO) and engaged in the detailed formulation of the Convention on Action against Trafficking in human beings and the Convention on preventing and combating violence against women and domestic violence (Istanbul Convention).

Nordmeyer was elected in 2004 to chair the German Committee of the United Nations Development Fund for Women (UNIFEM). In 2011 UNIFEM and three other UN organizations for women's rights merged into UN Women, which is part of the ECOSOC organization. Nordmeyer managed the transition of UNIFEM to UN Women for the German committees and simultaneously acquired NGO consultative status at ECOSOC for the German Committee of UN Women.

As the chairwoman of UN Women National Committee Germany, Nordmeyer represents the registered association in German and international committees on human and women's rights. By working in the Balkan region and in many Eastern European countries she served as an expert on the UN Security Council Resolution 1325 on Women, Peace and Security. She was elected to work as a member of the Federal Government of Germany Advisory Board for Civil Crisis Prevention and the NATO Advisory Board of Civil Society on Women, Peace and Security.

In 2019 Nordmeyer was elected presidium member of the United Nations Association of Germany.

The Federal President of Germany awarded Karin Nordmeyer the Order of Merit of the Federal Republic of Germany in 2017, in recognition of more than 50 years of voluntary work dedicated to promoting gender equality and women's rights.

== Private life ==
She has been living in the greater area of Freiburg im Breisgau since 1975. Nordmeyer is married and has three children and eight grandchildren.
