= Armenian Shooting Federation =

Sporting Organization

Armenian Shooting Federation logo

The Armenian Shooting Federation (Armenian: Հայաստանի հրաձգության ֆեդերացիա), also known as the Shooting Federation of Armenia, is the regulating body of shooting in Armenia, governed by the Armenian Olympic Committee. The headquarters of the federation is located in Yerevan.

== History ==
The Federation was established in 1993 and the current president is Arthur Hovhannisyan. The Federation is a full member of the International Shooting Sport Federation and the European Shooting Confederation. Armenian athletes participate in various European and international level shooting championships, including the ISSF World Shooting Championships and participate in shooting at the Summer Olympics.

== See also ==
- Practical Shooting Federation of Armenia
- Sport in Armenia
