= Fantan =

Fantan may refer to:

- Fan-Tan, a game of chance of Chinese origin;
- Fantan, Armenia, a town;
- Nanchang Q-5 Fantan jet aircraft;
