= Paragliding in Armenia =

This article discusses the sport of paragliding in Armenia.

== History ==
First flights were held by the members of “Small Aviation Club of Armenia” in 1996. Armenian Paragliding Sport Federation was founded in 2008. Paragliding has been taking up popularity in Armenia since then.

Currently AERO CLUB Armenia and Sky club are most active.

In 2015 and 2016 Russian Open Cup was carried out in Armenia and qualified as pre-world cup competition.

Armenian pilots often keep in touch via their Facebook group.

== Weather ==
The country has optimal landforms and weather conditions for both cross-country and tandem flights. With approximately 300 sunny days per year and diverse micro-climate regions, there are often weather conditions suitable for flying.

Flying season in Armenia is quite long with most flights being taken between May and November.

== Launch spots ==
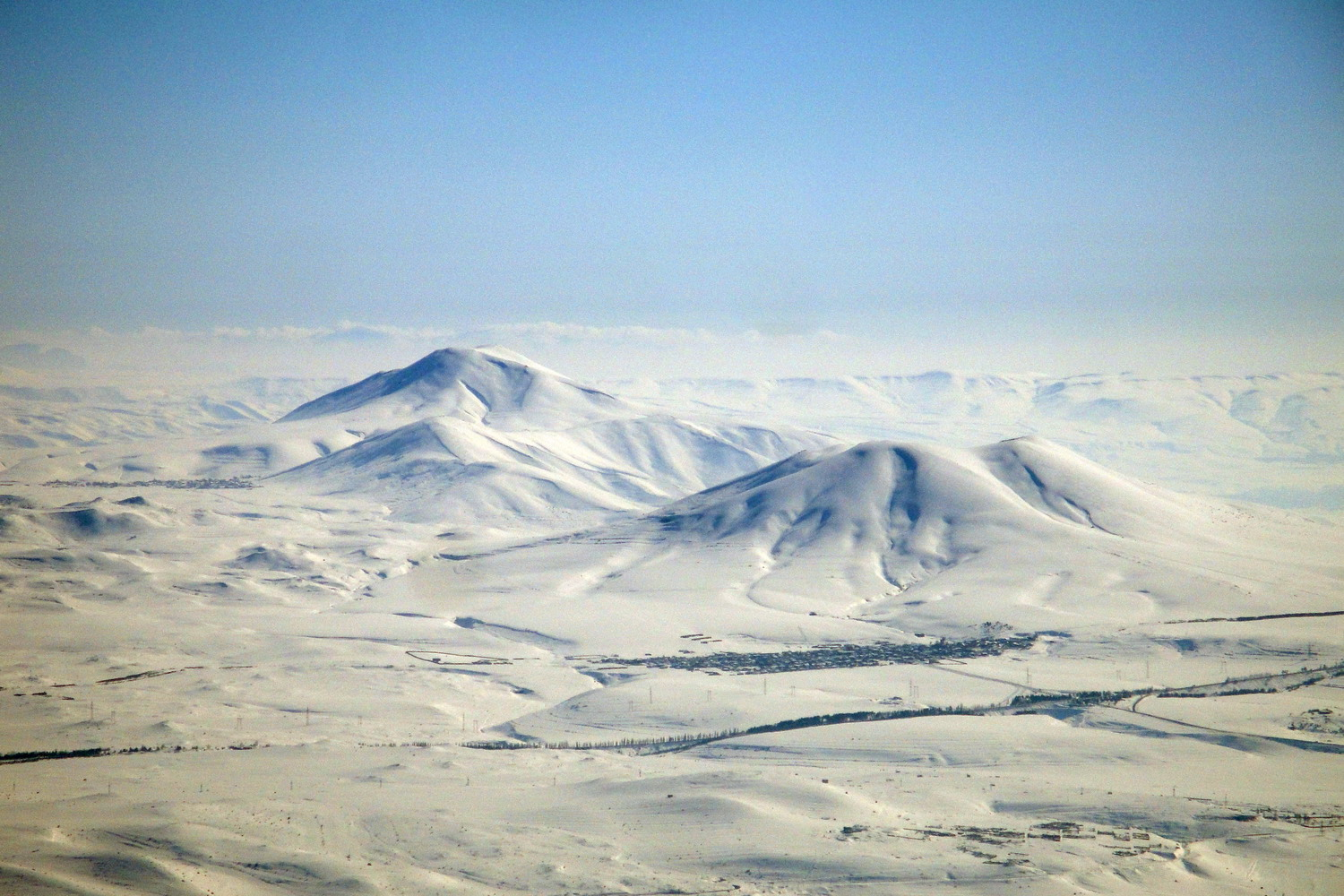
Mt Hatis (higher one) and Mt Guthanasar near Yerevan.

Main launch spots are:

- Hatis mountain near city of Abovyan
- Teghenis mountain
- hills in the area of Aparan town
- hills near town of Vedi
- hills close to Tsovagyugh village, near Lake Sevan.

All of above mentioned are accessible by car and except for Tsovagyugh site are good for cross-country flights.

Armenian pilots often hike and fly also from other mountains (e.g. Armaghan, Arteni and Artanish) too.

Further launch spots are hills above village of Yenokavan and Mount Gutan (Guthanasar).

== Tandem flights ==
Experienced trainers offer paragliding courses and tandem flights. Since 2017 paramotor courses and tandem flights are offered too.

Tandem flights are mostly offered at launch spots near Tsovaghugh at lake Sevan and Mount Hatis close to Yerevan. Depending on the weather conditions the duration of tandem flights can up to 20 minutes.

There is a hostel "Glide" in Yerevan, where foreign pilots come together and where the owner is a paragliding pilot.

== Practical use ==
In Armenia paramotor flights are helping out in archeological surveys.

== See also ==
- Tourism in Armenia
- Geography of Armenia
- Mountains of Armenia
