= Gutanasar =

Mountain in Armenia

Coordinates: 40.3679°N 44.6839°E

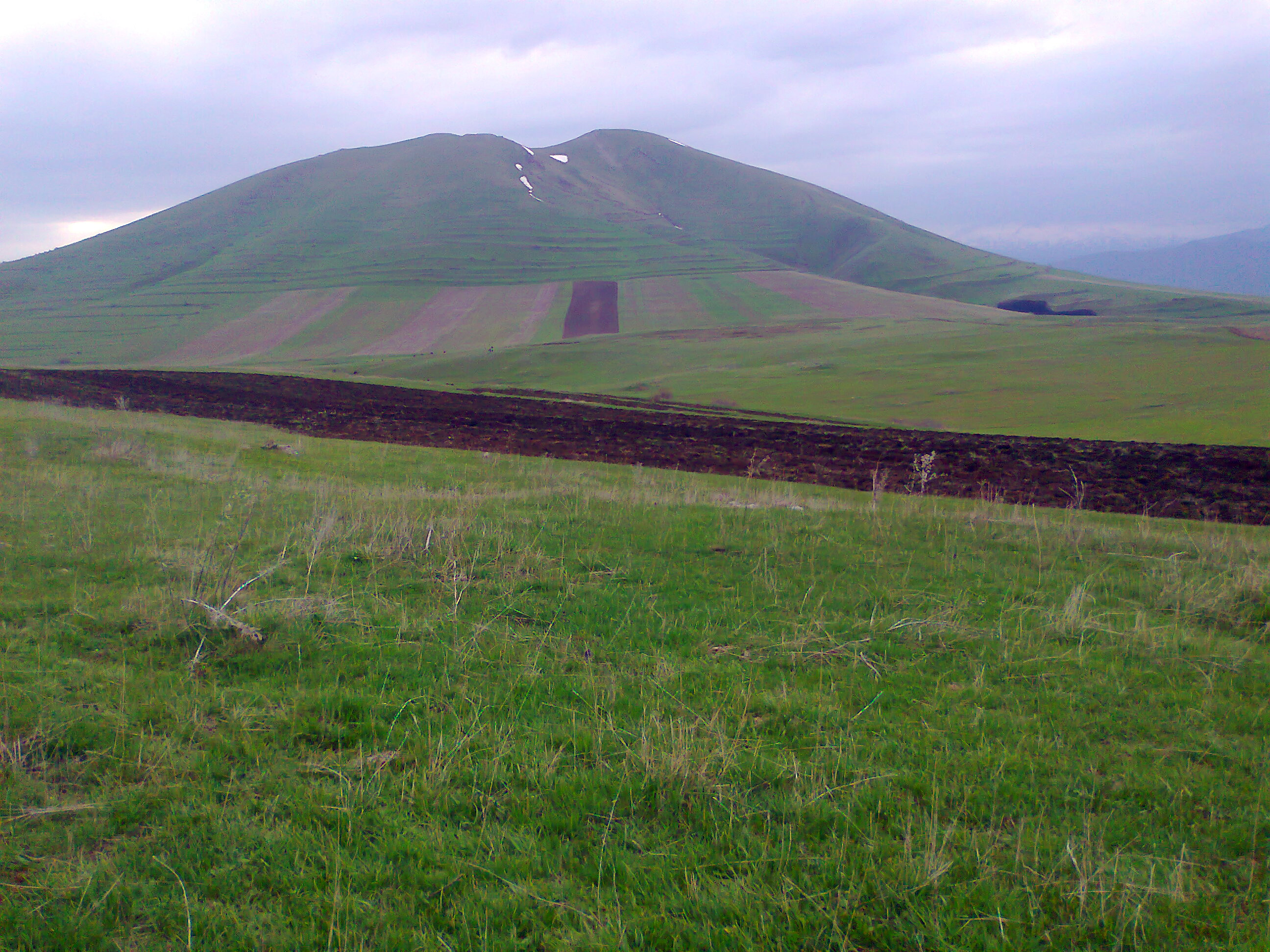
Gutanasar

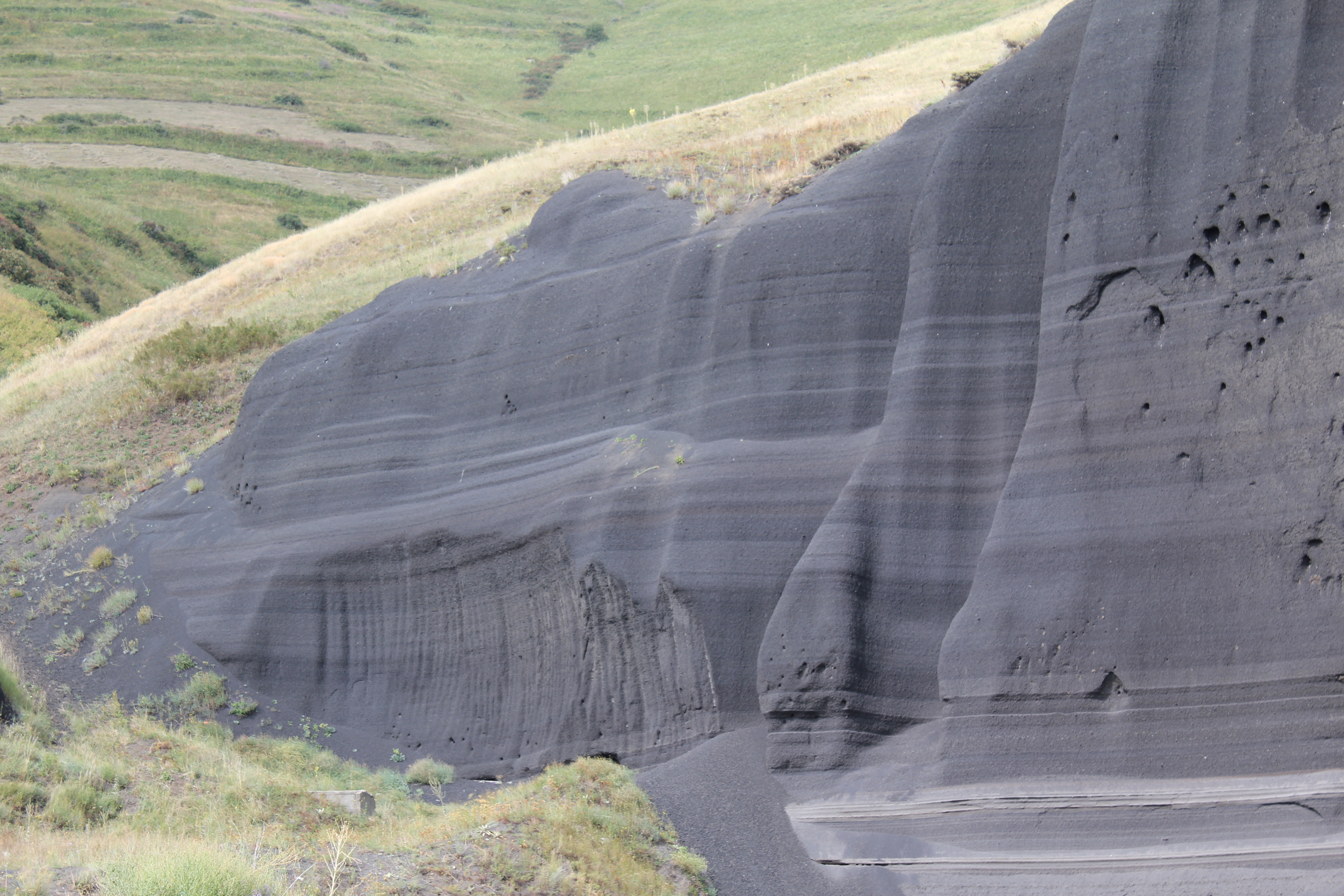
Lava on Gutanasar

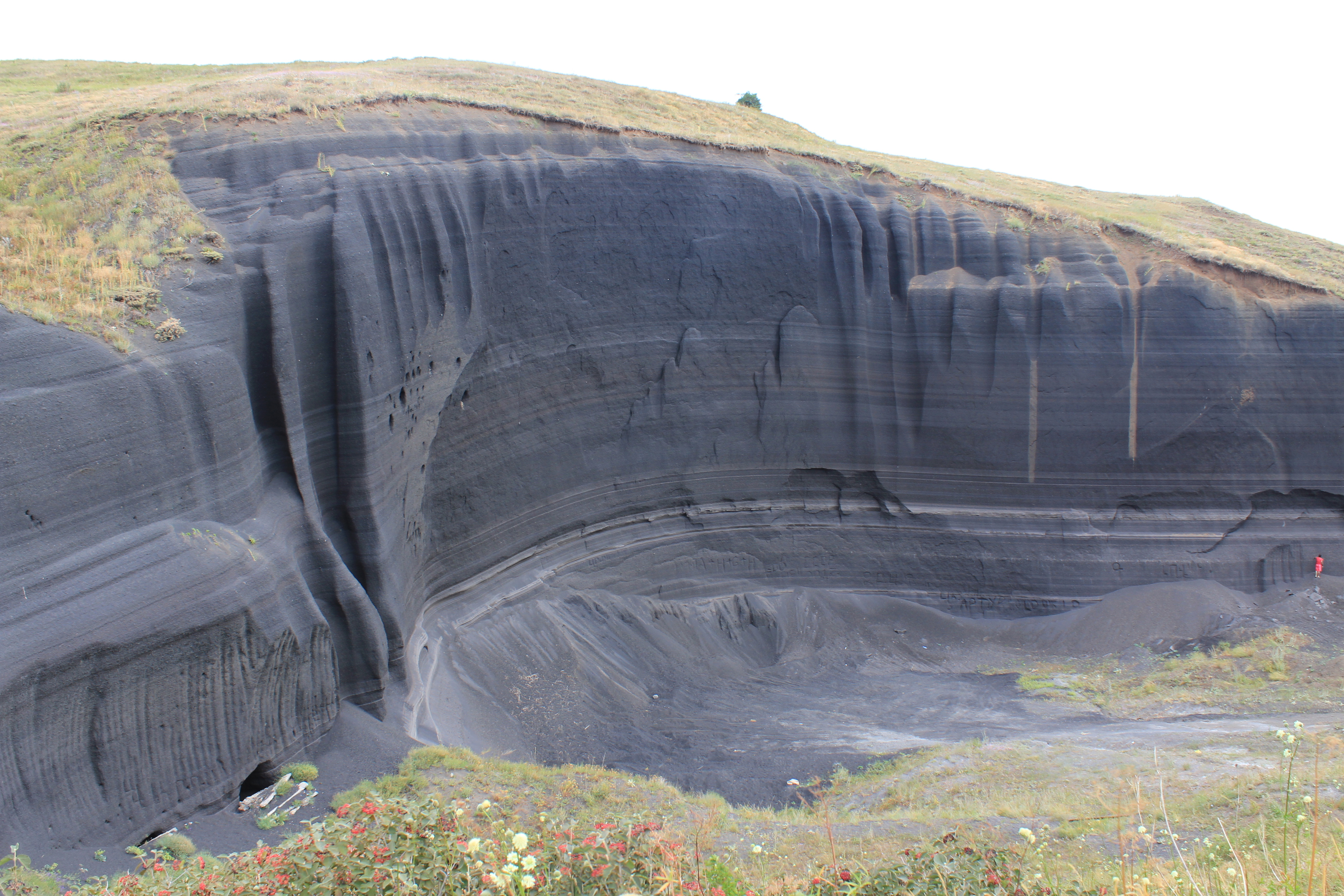
Lava on Gutanasar

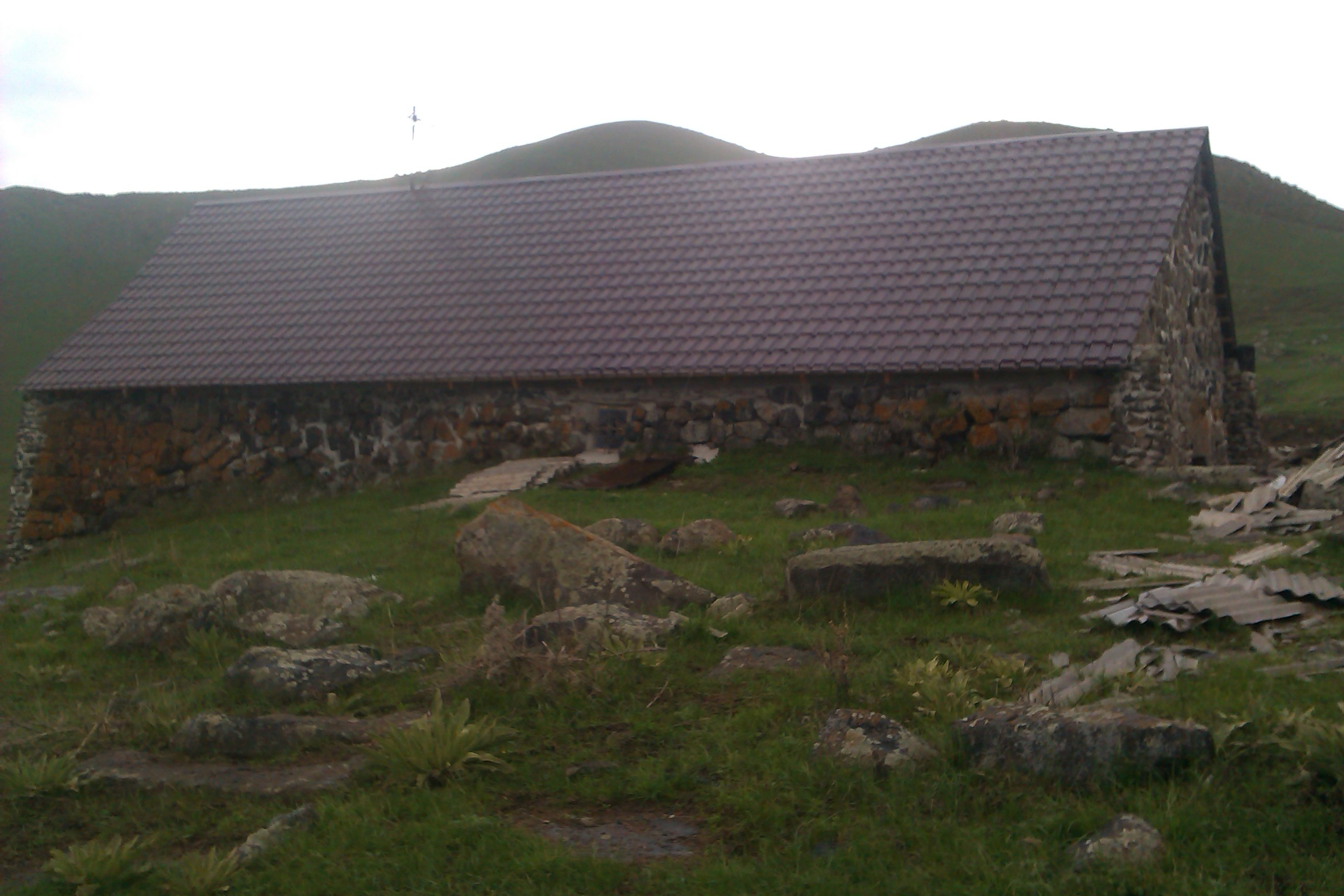
Church below mountain

Gutanasar or Gut'anasar (Armenian: Գութանասար) is a mountain in the Kotayk Province near Fantan in Armenia. It is a 7,543 ft (2,299 m) high. A small Surb Astvatsatsin Church is located below it. It is a volcano which last erupted 200,000 BP, judging from Ar39/Ar40 dating of lava flows, and one of the common sources of obsidian in archeological sites of Armenia. Neighbouring communities include Fontan and Alapars. The volcano is part of the Geghama mountains volcanic area. and appear to share a common feeding conduit.
