= List of Intangible Cultural Heritage elements in Armenia =

The United Nations Educational, Scientific and Cultural Organisation (UNESCO) intangible cultural heritage elements are the non-physical traditions and practices performed by a people. As part of a country's cultural heritage, they include celebrations, festivals, performances, oral traditions, music, and the making of handicrafts. The "intangible cultural heritage" is defined by the Convention for the Safeguarding of Intangible Cultural Heritage, drafted in 2003 and took effect in 2006. Inscription of new heritage elements on the UNESCO Intangible Cultural Heritage Lists is determined by the Intergovernmental Committee for the Safeguarding of Intangible Cultural Heritage, an organisation established by the convention. Armenia ratified the convention on 18 May 2006.

== Intangible Cultural Heritage of Humanity ==
+ Transnational element

=== Representative List ===
Name	Image	Year inscribed	No.	Description
Duduk and its music		2008	00092	The duduk is a double reed woodwind instrument made of apricot wood. It is commonly played in pairs: while the first player plays the melody, the second plays a steady drone called dum, and the sound of the two instruments together creates a richer, more haunting sound.
Armenian cross-stones art. Symbolism and craftsmanship of Khachkars		2010	00434	A khachkar is a carved, memorial stele bearing a cross, and often with additional motifs such as rosettes, interlaces, and botanical motifs.
Performance of the Armenian epic of 'Daredevils of Sassoun' or 'David of Sassoun'		2012	00743	Daredevils of Sassoun is a heroic epic poem in four cycles (parts), with its main hero and story better known as David of Sassoun, which is the story of one of the four parts.
Lavash, the preparation, meaning and appearance of traditional bread as an expression of culture in Armenia		2014	00985	Lavash is a thin flatbread usually leavened, traditionally baked in a tandoor (tonir or tanoor) or on a sajj.
Kochari, traditional group dance		2017	01295	Kochari is a folk dance originating in the Armenian Highlands.
Armenian letter art and its cultural expressions		2019	01513	
Pilgrimage to the St. Thaddeus Apostle Monastery + (Note: Shared with Iran.)		2020	01571	
Tradition of blacksmithing in Gyumri		2023	01967	Blacksmithing, or the creation and repair of iron objects, has played a central role in the local identity of the city of Gyumri.

== See also ==
- List of World Heritage Sites in Armenia
