= List of World Heritage Sites in Armenia =

Location of UNESCO World Heritage Sites within Armenia

The United Nations Educational, Scientific and Cultural Organization (UNESCO) designates World Heritage Sites of outstanding universal value to cultural or natural heritage which have been nominated by countries which are signatories to the UNESCO World Heritage Convention, established in 1972. Cultural heritage consists of monuments (such as architectural works, monumental sculptures, or inscriptions), groups of buildings, and sites (including archaeological sites). Natural heritage consists of natural features (physical and biological formations), geological and physiographical formations (including habitats of threatened species of animals and plants), and natural sites which are important from the point of view of science, conservation, or natural beauty. Armenia ratified the convention on 5 September 1993.

Armenia has three sites on the list, all of which are monasteries, churches, or related religious sites. The first property listed in Armenia was the Haghpat Monastery, in 1996. In 2000, the site was extended to include the Sanahin Monastery. In 2000, two further properties were added, the Cathedral and Churches of Echmiatsin together with the archaeological site of Zvartnots, and the Monastery of Geghard and the Upper Azat Valley. All three sites are of the cultural type. There are additional seven sites on the tentative list.

== World Heritage Sites ==
UNESCO lists sites under ten criteria; each entry must meet at least one of the criteria. Criteria i through vi are cultural, and vii through x are natural.

World Heritage Sites
Site	Image	Location	Year listed	UNESCO data	Description
Monasteries of Haghpat and Sanahin	Haghbat Monastery, church buildings in stone	Lori Province	1996	777bis; ii, iv (cultural)	The monasteries of Haghpat and Sanahin were constructed in the second half of the 10th century under the patronage of Queen Khosrovanush, wife of King Ashot III. Additional buildings in both complexes were being added until the 13th century. Architecturally, the monasteries combine the features of Byzantine ecclesiastical architecture with the vernacular regional styles from the Caucasus. The Haghpat Monastery (pictured) was listed as a World Heritage Site in 1996, the Sanahin Monastery (along with the Sanahin Bridge) was added in 2000.
Monastery of Geghard and the Upper Azat Valley	A church in Armenian style	Kotayk Province	2000	960; ii (cultural)	The Monastery of Geghard is located in the Azat River gorge. Saint Gregory the Illuminator founded the monastery in the 4th century, according to tradition. This coincided with the introduction of Christianity as the state religion in Armenia. The main complex dates to the 13th century. It includes rock-cut churches, tombs, residential cells, and several khachkars (Armenian memorial stele with decorated crosses). The monastery was an important ecclesial and cultural centre of medieval Armenia.
Cathedral and Churches of Echmiatsin and the Archaeological Site of Zvartnots	Etchmiadzin Cathedral, a large building complex in stone	Armavir Province	2000	1011; ii, iii (cultural)	This site covers churches that illustrate the evolution and development of Armenian ecclesial architecture. Churches in Etchmiadzin (today called Vagharshapat) include the Etchmiadzin Cathedral (founded in 301, pictured), Saint Gayane Church (630), Saint Hripsime Church (618), and Shoghakat Church (built in 1694 upon a 4th-century chapel). The Zvartnots Church was built in the 7th century but destroyed in the 10th century, possibly due to an earthquake.

== Tentative list ==
In addition to the sites inscribed on the World Heritage list, member states can maintain a list of tentative sites that they may consider for nomination. Nominations for the World Heritage list are only accepted if the site has previously been listed on the tentative list. Armenia has seven such sites.

Tentative sites
Site	Image	Location	Year listed	UNESCO criteria	Description
The archaeological site of the city of Dvin	Ancient stone capital with fern-like relief at the archaeological site of Dvin	Ararat Province	1995	ii, iii, vi (cultural)	King Khosrov III built a palace in Dvin in the 4th century, to serve as the capital of Armenia and the seat of Catholicos. During the Sasanian period and under the Caliphate, Dvin served as a regional capital. In the 13th century, it was destroyed by the Mongols.
The basilica and archaeological site of Yererouk	The ruins of Yererouk Basilica	Shirak Province	1995	iii, iv, vi (cultural)	The basilica was built in the 4th century CE and is one of the earliest Christian monuments in Armenia. It was damaged by an earthquake in the 17th century and is now a ruin.
The monastery of Noravank and the upper Amaghou Valley	Stone church building, mountains in the background	Vayots Dzor Province	1995	i, iii, vi, vii, ix (mixed)	The monastery dates to the 13th century and is located in a river gorge. Some buildings in the complex were designed by the architect Momik.
The monasteries of Tatev and Tatevi Anapat and the adjacent areas of the Vorotan Valley	Stone church building on a cliff, look from above	Syunik Province	1995	i, ii, iv, vi, vii, ix (mixed)	The monastery of Tatev, dating from the 9th to 13th centuries, lies above the Vorotan gorge, while the Tatevi Anapat monastery from the 17th century lies on the bottom of the valley. The gorge, with the depth of 850 metres (2,790 ft), is the deepest in Armenia.
Vishaps and the Cultural Landscape of Tirinkatar	Several stone stele and trees in the background	Aragatsotn Province	2024	ii, iii, vi (cultural)	Vishap stones are prehistoric stelae found in the Armenian highlands. The main site with these stones is Tirinkatar, which was seasonally inhabited already in the 6th millennium BCE, making it one of the earliest archaeological sites in high mountains. Due to several monumental stelae, the site was likely a cult centre. There are three typologies of vishap stones, bull-type, fish-type, and hybrid.
The Archaeological Complex of Garni and the ‘Basalt Organ’ Columnar Joint	A reconstructed Hellenistic temple in a snow-covered landscape	Kotayk Province	2025	iii, iv, vii, viii (mixed)	Garni developed from a Bronze Age settlement to an important Urartu centre and later had connections with the Greco-Roman world, as illustrated by the Garni Temple (pictured), a 1st-century CE Hellenistic temple dedicated to Mithra. The temple collapsed in the 1679 earthquake but was reconstructed in the 20th century. From the natural point of view, the Garni Gorge is significant for the basalt columnar formation and for its rich plant life, owing to the location between the Caucasus and the dries Armeno-Iranian region.
The Urartian Heritage of Yerevan	Remains of ancient fortress walls	Yerevan	2025	ii, iii, iv (cultural)	Urartu, under king Argishti I, was a major power of the region in the 8th century BCE. The nomination comprises several Urartian sites in Yerevan, dating from the 8th to the 6th centuries BCE. They include the Erebuni Fortress (pictured), Karmir Blur, and the Biainian Tomb.
Areni-1 (Birds’) Cave: Prehistoric Life and Winemaking in the Arpa River Gorge	Panorama along the river with a cave entrance	Vayots Dzor Province	2026	iii, iv, v (cultural)	Initially occupied in the late 7th millennium BCE, significant activity occurred during the Late Chalcolithic and Early Bronze Age. It is crucial for viniculture, housing the earliest known winery with fermentation vats dating to around 4000 BCE. Notable artifacts include the oldest leather shoe and evidence of ritual practices. Excavations since 2007 reveal insights into subsistence, agricultural innovation, and early human technologies, enhancing our understanding of prehistoric Armenian culture and diet.

== See also ==
- List of Intangible Cultural Heritage in Armenia
- Tourism in Armenia
