= Tourism in Armenia =

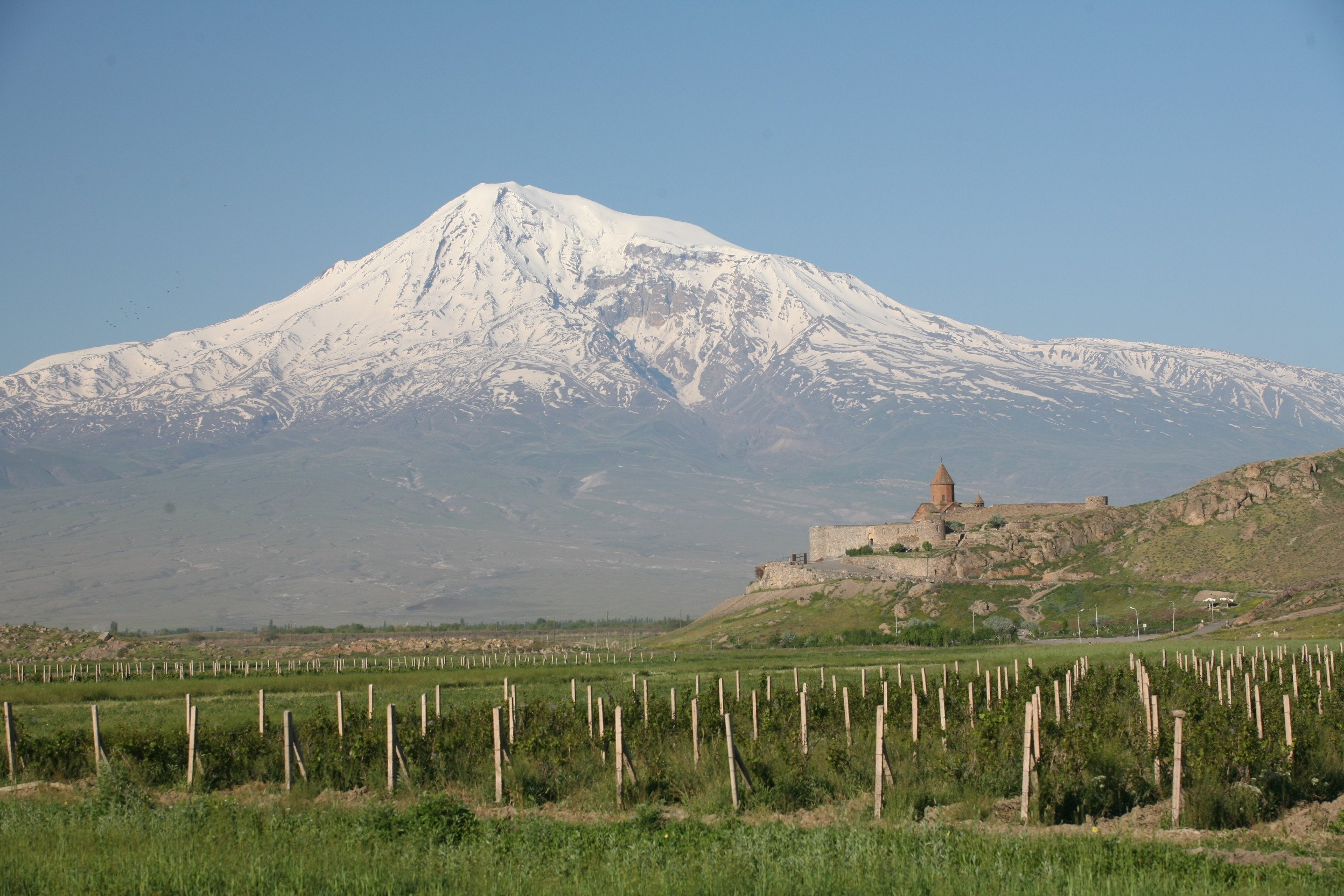
Khor Virap and Ararat mountain

Tourism in Armenia has been a key sector to the Armenian economy since the 1990s when tourist numbers exceeded half a million people visiting the country every year (mostly ethnic Armenians from the Diaspora). The Armenian Ministry of Economy reports that most international tourists come from Russia, EU states, the United States and Iran. Though relatively small in size, Armenia has four UNESCO world heritage sites.

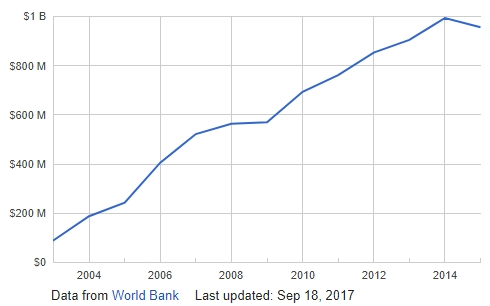
Receipts from international incoming tourism in Armenia in 2003-2015 in current USD. Data from World Bank.

Despite internal and external problems, the number of incoming tourists has been continually increasing since 2007. Armenia received 2.2 million international visitors in 2024, 4.6% below the record 2.3 million visitors recorded in 2023. Most tourists focus their trip in Yerevan, the capital, where the majority of travel agencies, attractions and hotels are located.

Outdoor activities, sightseeing and nature tourism seem to be the primary attractions. Tsaghkadzor, Jermuk, Dilijan are known as mountainous resorts, which are outside of the capital. Tourists stay at the hotels of those towns in order to engage in extended trips over all Armenia without returning to Yerevan every day. The classical sightseeing trips to Armenia are popular not only among tourists, but also with the local population. Mountaineering, camping, hiking and other kinds of outdoor activities are also common.

== History ==
=== Since 2015 ===
In February 2020, the UN's World Tourism Organization reported that Armenia is one of the world’s fastest growing tourist destinations according to the latest statistics. Armenia ranked 12th with 14.4% growth in the list of 20 fastest growing countries for tourism, according to data gathered.

French magazine Le Quotidien du tourisme mentioned Armenia as the most trending destination of 2020.

Yerevan was included in Booking.com's top 10 trending destinations for 2020.

In October 2019, chief executive of Ryanair stated that Armenia has become one of Europe's fastest growing tourist destinations, during an announcement of launching new Ryanair flight routes between several European cities and Armenia.

As per the 2019 Travel and Tourism competitiveness report, Armenia scored 7th-best in the world on the Hotel Price Index. It also scored 3rd-best in Europe on tourist-friendly visa requirements. Overall, Armenia scored 79th of 140 countries. Calculation of overall scores includes some controversial subcategories related to country size (e.g. number of large sports stadiums), estimates based on old data (like 2014 data for aircraft departures) and non-applicable data (in case of landlocked Armenia - quality of ports infrastructure). Out of 140 countries Armenia ranked: 50 on Enabling Environment Subindex, 74 on Travel & Tourism Policy and Enabling Conditions Subindex, 81 on Infrastructure Subindex, 103 on Natural and Cultural Resources and Business Travel Subindex.

Forbes Magazine listed Armenia among top budget travel destinations for 2019. Meanwhile, CNN has ranked Armenia's capital Yerevan as one of the top 20 most beautiful European cities.

In July 2019, the chairman of the Central Bank of Armenia, Artur Javadyan, stated that the average spending of tourists had increased by more than 17 per cent from 2013 to 2018 and roughly 300 new hotels opened over the last six years.

In 2018, receipts from international tourism amounted to $1.2 billion or $413 per capita. In per capita terms Armenia was ahead of Turkey and Azerbaijan, but behind Georgia.

In 2016, The Daily Telegraph rated Armenia as "Europe's best kept secret".

Currently, the majority of tourists arriving in Armenia are from the member states of the European Union, CIS countries including Russia and Kazakhstan, and also from Georgia, Iran, the United States and increasingly from Asia, in particular China, Japan, South Korea, the Philippines and India. In addition, due to ongoing cultural and education system reforms, thousands of students from India, Iran and Arabic countries started to visit Armenia in order to study in the main universities of Yerevan, especially at the Yerevan State Medical University, promoting further tourism.

Armenia also has the capability to hold both regional political and large-scale international conferences and events. For example, Armenia hosted the Plenary meeting of the Euronest Parliamentary Assembly in 2015 as well as ongoing Eastern Partnership and CIS conferences. In October 2018, Armenia hosted the Organisation internationale de la Francophonie Summit for the first time, where representatives of 54 countries participated. In November 2018, the Parliamentary Assembly of the Organization of the Black Sea Economic Cooperation was held in Yerevan. In September 2019, Armenia hosted the European Heritage Days, Armenia also hosted the 2019 UEFA European Under-19 Championship in July and the World Information Technology and Services Alliance Congress for the first time, in which 2000 delegates from around 83 countries participated. Also in 2019, Armenia hosted the Eurasian Economic Union Summit in Yerevan, the CSTO Parliamentary Assembly, as well as the Summit of Minds international conference, making Armenia the first country to host the event outside of France.

In August 2020, the President of Armenia, Armen Sarksyan, announced that Armenia will host the sixth Starmus Festival from September 6 to 11, 2021. The event was sponsored by the President himself, as well as, the Ministry of Education and Science. The event brought together world-class scientists, artists, astronauts, and the general public to celebrate science communication and to share latest discoveries in a number of scientific fields.

In 2022, Armenia hosted the Junior Eurovision Song Contest.

=== 2000-2015 ===
Since the 2000s, a new page for Armenian tourism was opened. Diaspora Armenians from Russia, United States, Lebanon, France and other countries increasingly visited Armenia to see their independent homeland and free Artsakh. Also many foreigners from Europe and the United States started viewing Armenia as a tourist destination.

In addition, the increasing of visitors of Persians, Kurds and Iranian Azerbaijanis was a new concept for tourism in Armenia. Middle Eastern tourists started visiting Armenia since the 1990s, but in the 2000s visiting Armenia became more popular, especially for Iranians. Many Iranians enjoy celebrating Nowruz (Iranian New Year) in Armenia, which is held on the 21 March, and spend their summer and winter vacations in a country free of religious restrictions and greater freedoms. The number of tourists visiting Artsakh has seen increases as well.

Since 2012, new hotels were built in Armenia, and the old ones were reconstructed. ″Tufenkian″ hotels (in Yerevan, Tsapatagh, Dzoraget and Dilijan), ″National″, ″Paris″ hotels were built in Yerevan, ″Nairi″ and ″Silachi″ hotels were reopened, Marriott opened the second hotel in Tsaghkadzor, and in 2013, Hyatt opened two hotels - in Jermuk and Yerevan, Golden Palace was opened in Tsaghkadzor, later two more hotels - Opera Suite Hotel and Radisson Blu were opened in Yerevan. These were the best hotels, with 4 or 5 stars.

The number of visitors to Armenia increases also due to festivals and international competitions. Examples include, the annual Golden Apricot international film festival, the annual Aurora Prize for Awakening Humanity award shows, the 2011 Junior Eurovision Song Contest hosted in Armenia, the Birthright Armenia Program in which thousands of schoolchildren and students worldwide visit Armenia, and every four years, the Pan-Armenian Games are hosted in Armenia, in which thousands of competitors from across the Armenian Diaspora compete in various sporting events.

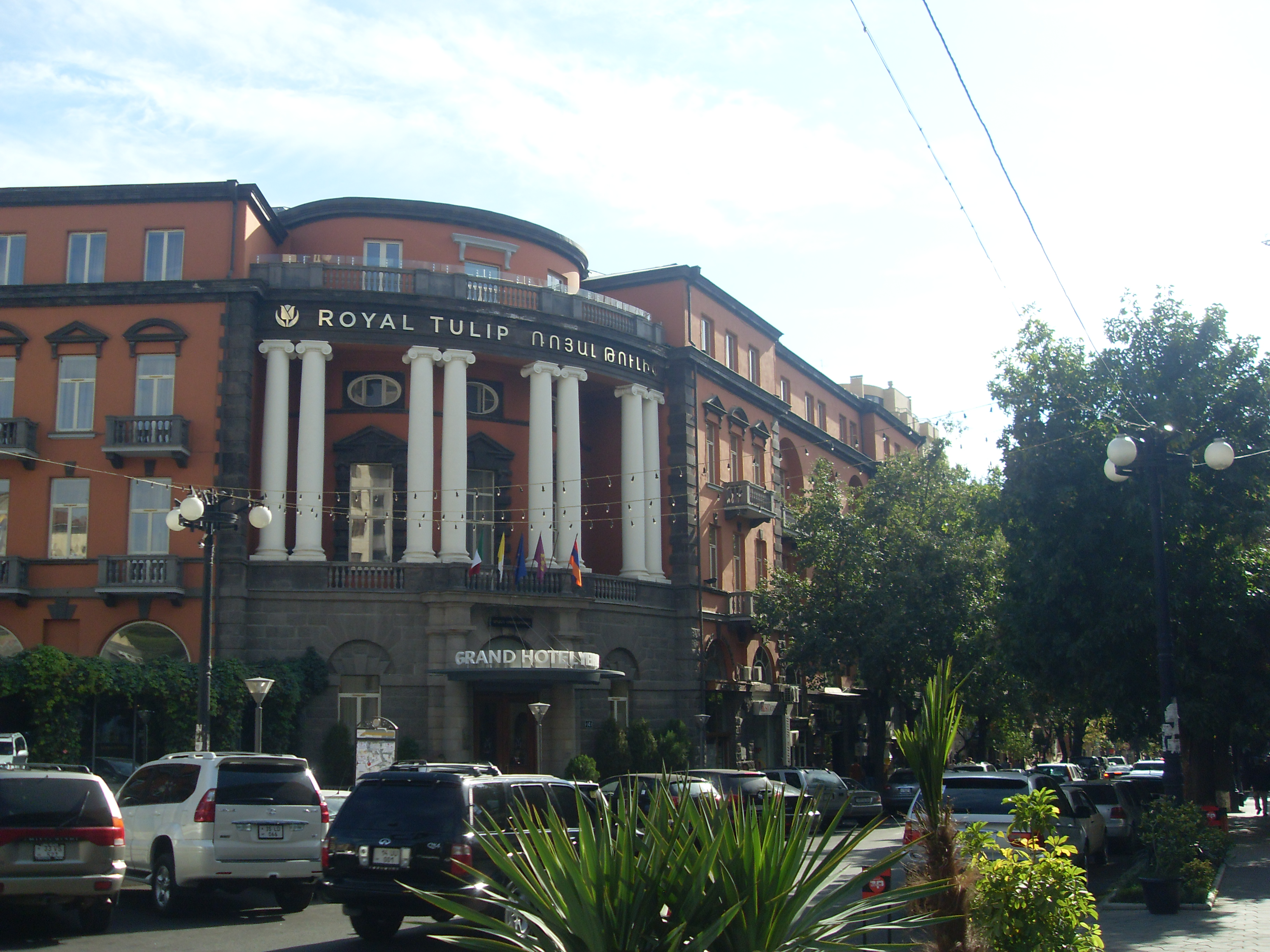
Hotel Yerevan, established in 1926 and formerly named "Intourist".

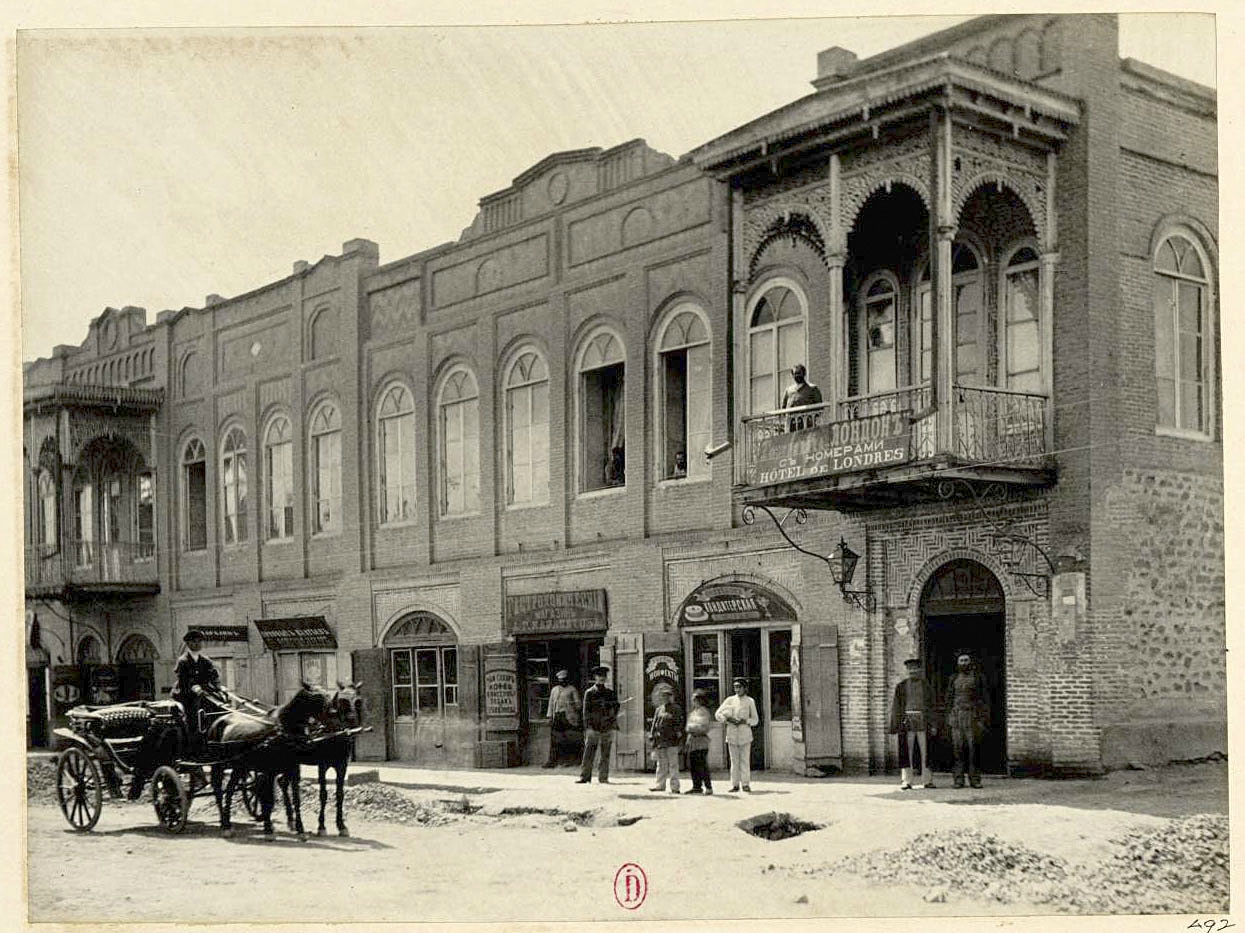
Hotel de Londres, Yerevan, 1891

== Government regulation ==
The tourism sector is regulated by the Tourism Committee, a department of the Ministry of Economy.

Armenia has made tourism a state level priority. Tourism is one of the principles of state policy as defined in the Tourism and Tourist Activities Law. The general purpose of state tourism policy is to expand tourism's contribution to the national economy's sustainable development and equal territorial economic growth, while also reducing poverty through maintaining high rates of growth in the number of inbound and domestic tourists, enhancing tourism-generated revenue by providing higher-value products and services and generating new job opportunities in the industry.

Effective tourism state policy development and execution, well-established public-private partnerships, and mutually beneficial international and regional cooperation have resulted in tremendous growth in the tourist sector over the previous decade. This expansion is seen in both the quantity and geographic spread of international tourist visits, as well as investment in hospitality and related infrastructure. Armenia's tourism business has grown significantly in the last five years, with an average growth of nearly 9% per year in international tourist arrivals.

== Statistics ==
Tourists in Armenia
Year	Number	%±
2007	510,000	-
2008	588,000	+ 15%
2009	575,000	2%
2010	678,000	+ 18%
2011	758,000	+ 12%
2012	844,000	+ 11%
2013	1,082,000	+ 28%
2014	1,204,000	+ 11%
2015	1,192,000	1%
2016	1,259,657	+ 6%
2017	1,494,779	+ 18.7%
2018	1,651,782	+ 10.5%
2019	1,932,230	+ 15%

Yearly tourist arrivals in thousands

In 2019 the number of incoming tourists increased by 15% to 1.93 million visitors.

Country rank in 2017	Country	Share of arriving visitors in 2016	Share of arriving visitors in 2017
	European Union countries together	25.8%	21.3%
1	Russia	21.7%	20.3%
2	Iran	17.0%	14.2%
3	United States	9.6%	13.6%

Arrival purpose	Share of arriving visitors in 2016	Share of arriving visitors in 2017
Business travel	31.9%	23.9%
Recreation	49.8%	52.8%
Other	18.3%	23.3%

== Safety ==
Safety Index 2020 published by Numbeo ranks Armenia as 9th safest country in the world, at par with Switzerland.

Armenia ranked 94th on the Global Terrorism Index of 2019, better than nearly all Western European and Scandinavian countries (except for Portugal, Switzerland, Norway and Denmark). Armenia and Kazakhstan had the largest improvements in the Eurasia region.

Armenia is among the world's safest countries according to Gallup International's 2019 Law and Order report. Based on the outcomes of the survey aiming to identify the Countries/Areas Most Likely to Feel Safe, Armenia is ranked the 7th on the list of the 18 states appearing in the top positions. An estimated 89% of the respondents said they feel absolutely safe in Armenia. The country has thus shared the 6th-7th positions with Switzerland. In the main ranking, Armenia shares the 11th position along with countries like France, Ireland, Sweden and Japan.

== Air travel ==
=== Regulation and statistics ===
Air traffic is regulated by the Civil Aviation Committee.

An agreement on "Comprehensive Air Transportation" was initiated with the EU, the ratification of which will liberalize Armenian market for all EU member states and introduce EU criteria ensuring predictable business for airlines.

The number of tourists arriving in the country by air transportation has been increasing yearly. In 2018, passenger flow at the two main airports of Armenia reached a record high of 2,856,673 million people. At the end of 2019, this figure further increased, surpassing 3,000,000 passengers for the first time.

=== Airports ===
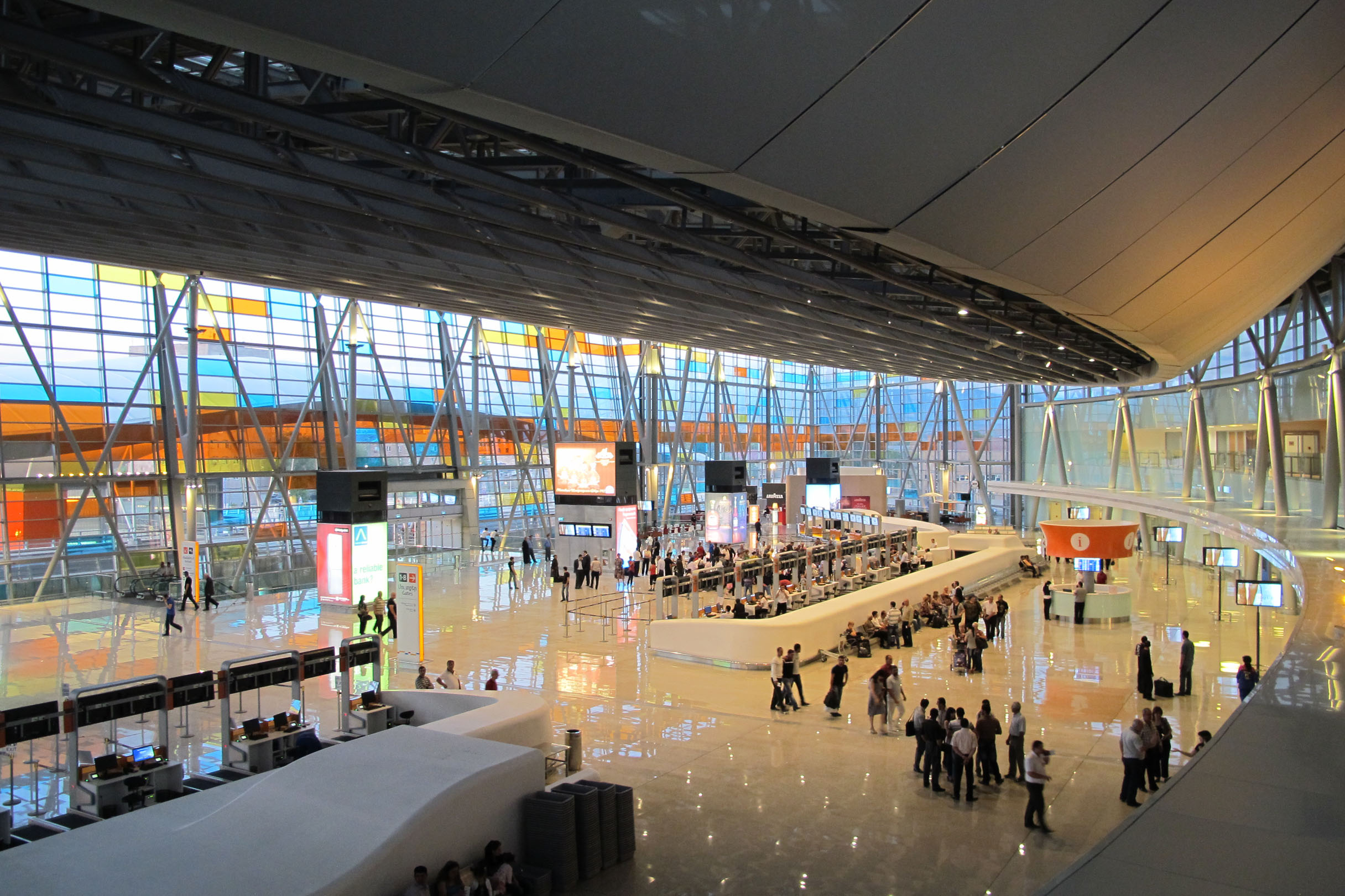
Yerevan Zvartnots International Airport.

The main airports used for commercial aviation are Yerevan's Zvartnots Airport and Gyumri's Shirak Airport.

Reconstruction of the previously defunct Syunik Airport near the town of Kapan was completed in December 2020, with flights expected to begin in January 2022. One way flights between Yerevan and Kapan should take 40 minutes and cost 20,000 dram, compared to 5 hours by taxi costing 6,000 dram, allowing easy access of tourists to southern Armenia and Artsakh.

=== Airlines ===
In October 2019, Ryanair begun selling tickets to Yerevan and Gyumri. WizzAir announced flights from Vienna and Vilnius commencing in April 2020. AirBaltic scheduled to resume flights to Yerevan in May 2020.

During June 2016 - August 2021, thirteen airlines began operating flights to Armenia and two have resumed flights: Armenia Aircompany, Brussels Airlines, Qatar Airways, Cham Wings, Air Cairo, Red Wings, Nordwind Airlines, Pobeda, Belavia (resumed flights), Czech Airlines (resumed flights), WizzAir, Ryanair, Eurowings, Condor (airline), and Lufthansa.

== Sports and extreme activities ==
In 2011, the journal ″National Geographic Traveler″ qualified Armenia not only a historical and cultural, but also extreme touristic county.

Armenia has 85.9% mountain area, more than Switzerland or Nepal, opening large possibilities for active travelers.

Armenia has various offers for tourists interested in sports and extreme activities - such as skiing, mountaineering, camping, hiking, speleology tours, paragliding, zipline, balloon flights, helicopter tours and the current longest reversible aerial tramway in the world.

Armenia has favorable conditions for paragliding in independent and tandem flights. Owing to the height and rugged landscape, the country has various micro climates, creating perfect circumstances for paragliding. The first paragliding flights were held by the members of "Small Aviation Club of Armenia" in 1996. Later, in 2008, Armenian Paragliding Sport Federation was founded. Currently AVIS club and Sky club are most active. They organize competitions, paragliding learning courses nowadays and tandem flights with flying season lasting from May to November. Tandem and free flights are mostly launched at mountains near Hatis, Aparan and Lake Sevan. Depending on the weather conditions tandem flights last up to 20 minutes.

== Ecotourism ==
Armenia is also a burgeoning ecotourism destination, with activities such as agrotourism, rural life experiences, rafting and biking. Popular ecotourism destinations include the villages of Kalavan, Urtsadzor; eco-lodging spots like Yenokavan, Lastiver and others.

== UNESCO World Heritage Sites ==
There are some objects in Armenia which are in the official list of UNESCO World Heritage Sites:

Site Name	Year It Became A WHS	City
Monasteries of Haghpat and Sanahin	1996	Haghpat
The Cathedral and Churches of Echmiadzin and the Archaeological Site of Zvartnots	2000	Vagharshapat
Monastery of Geghard and the Upper Azat Valley	2000	Goght

There are also four tentative World Heritage Sites in Armenia:

The archaeological site of the city of Dvin, the basilica and archaeological site of Yererouk, the monasteries of Tatev and Tatevi, and the monastery of Noravank and the upper Amaghou Valley.

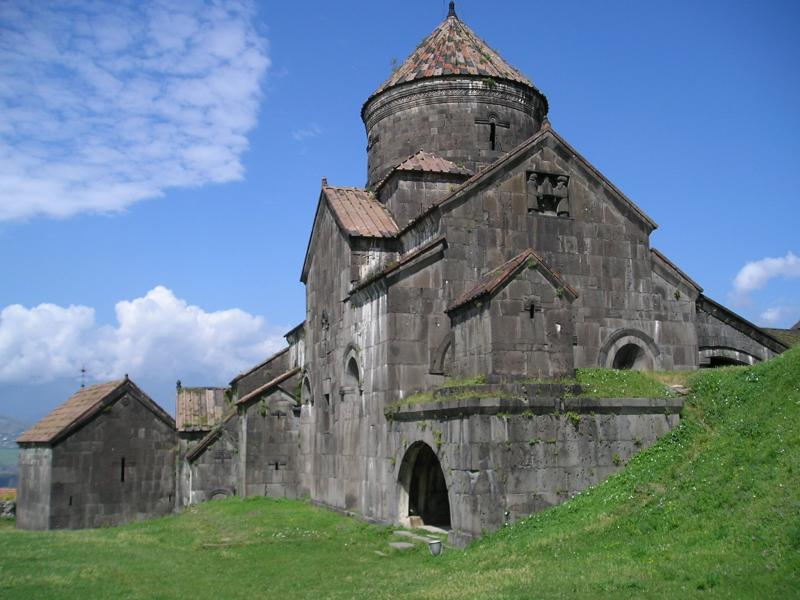
Monastery of Haghpat

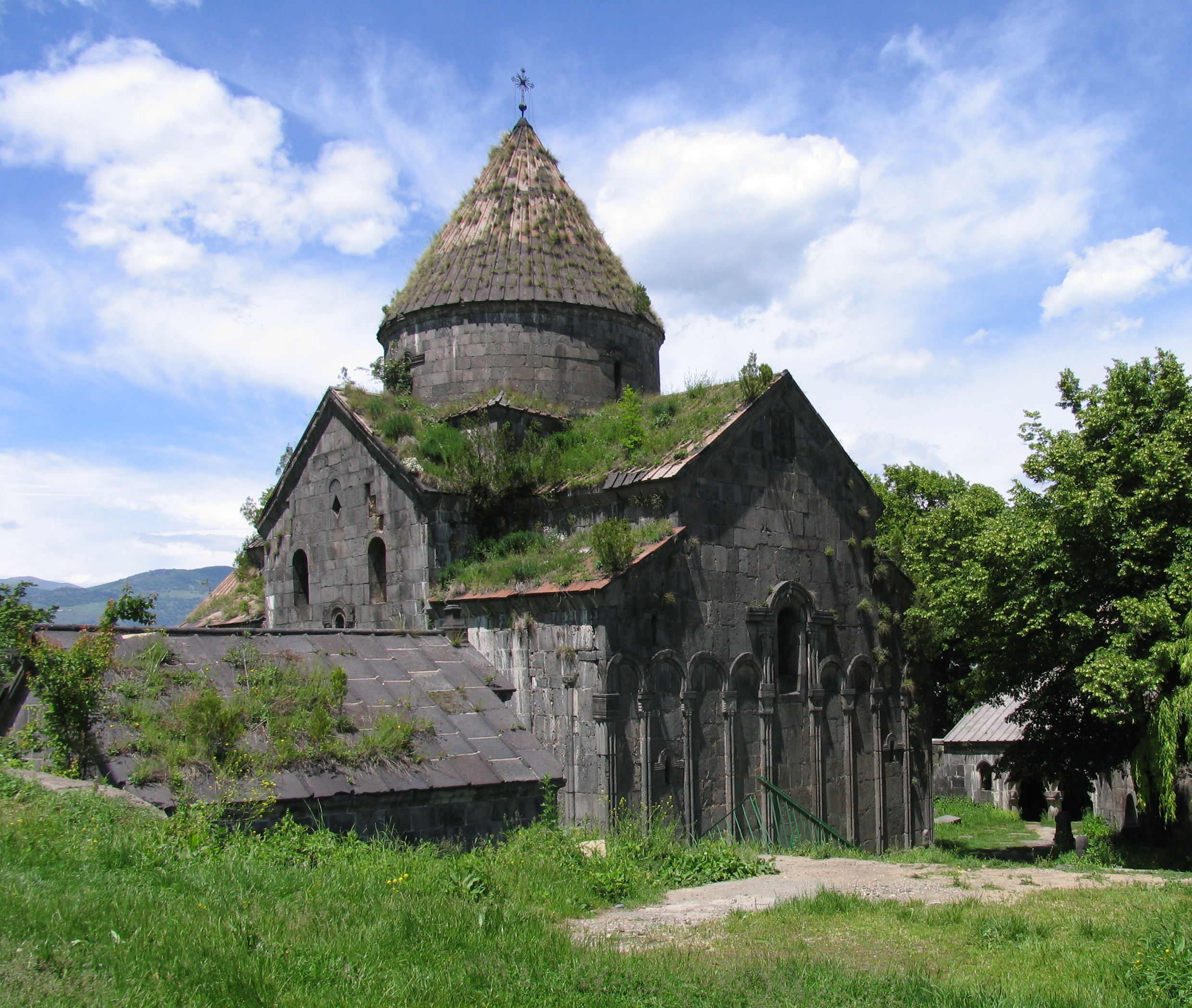
Monastery of Sanahin

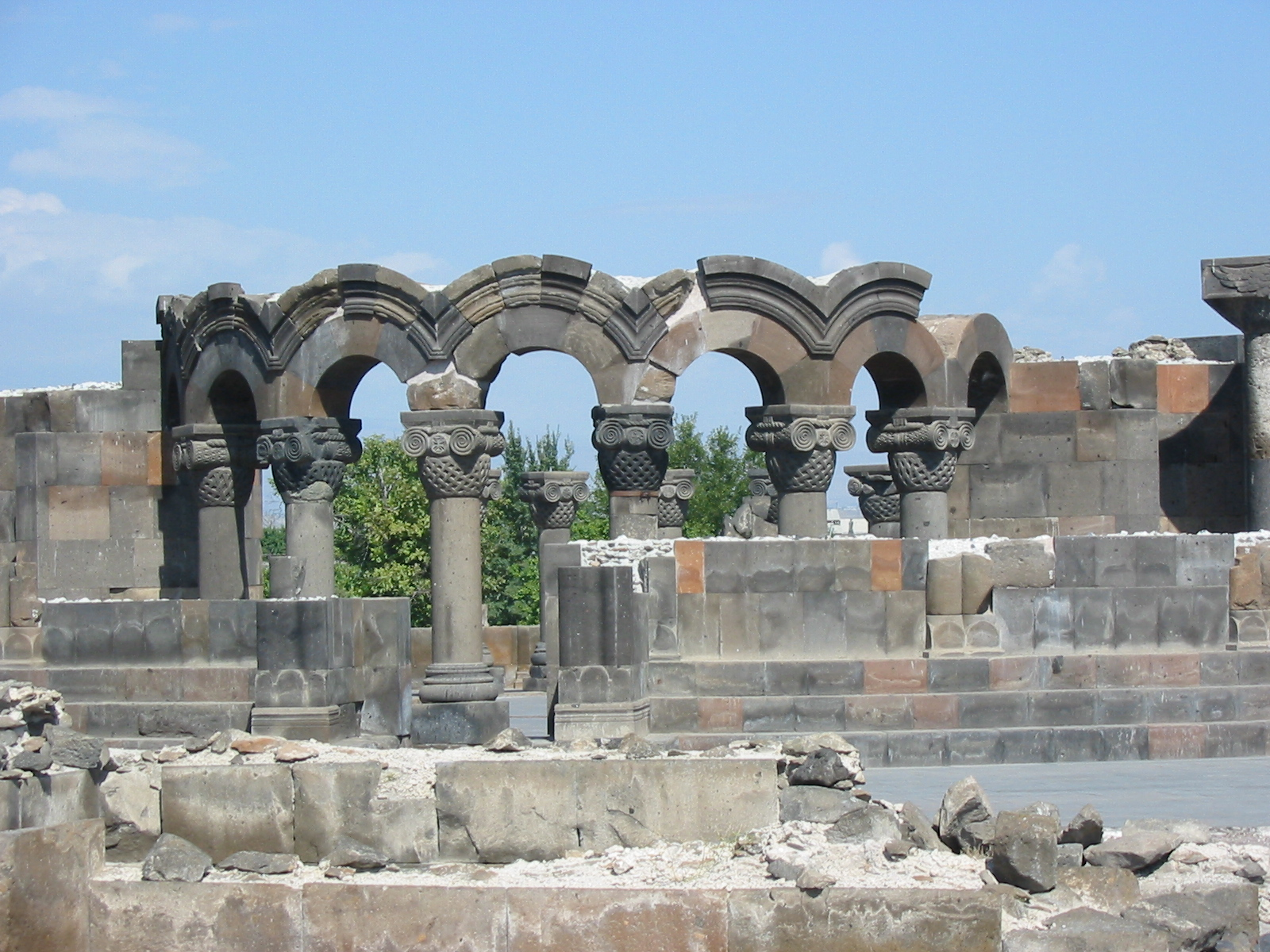
The Archaeological Site of Zvartnots

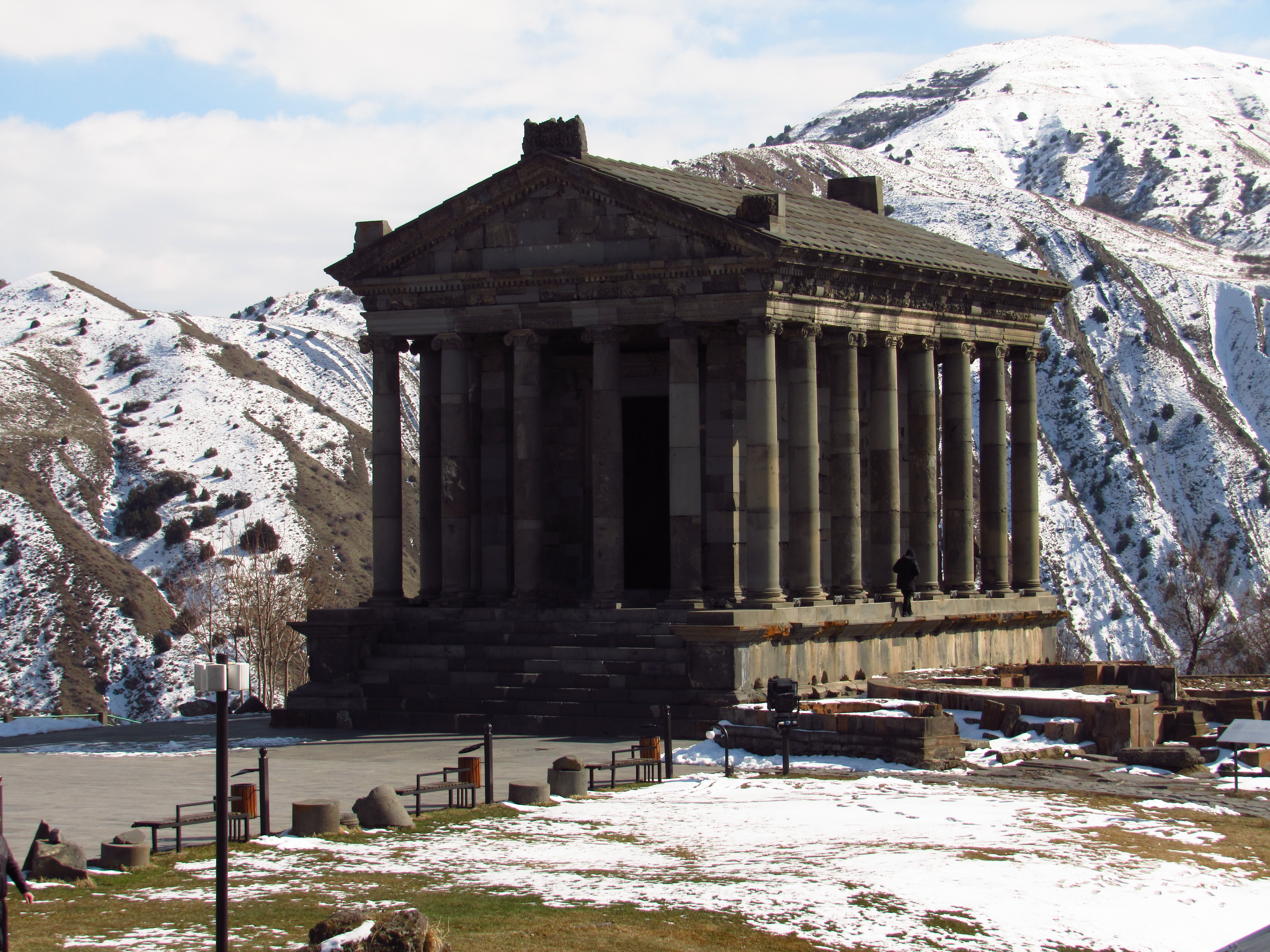
Temple of Garni

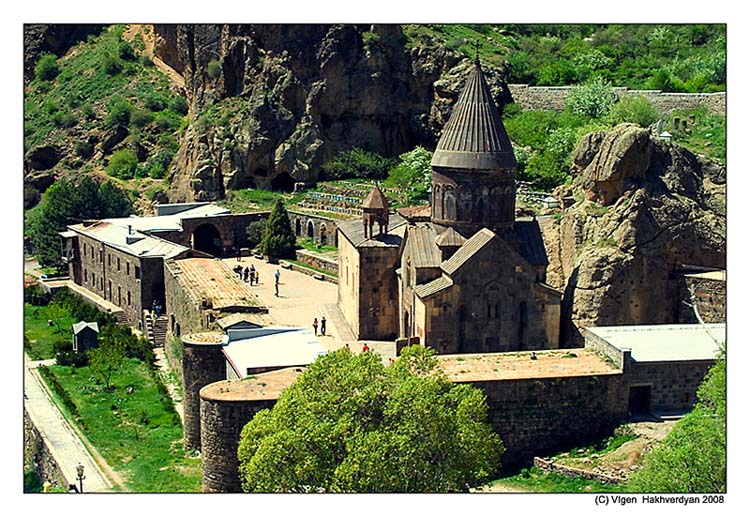
Monastery of Geghard

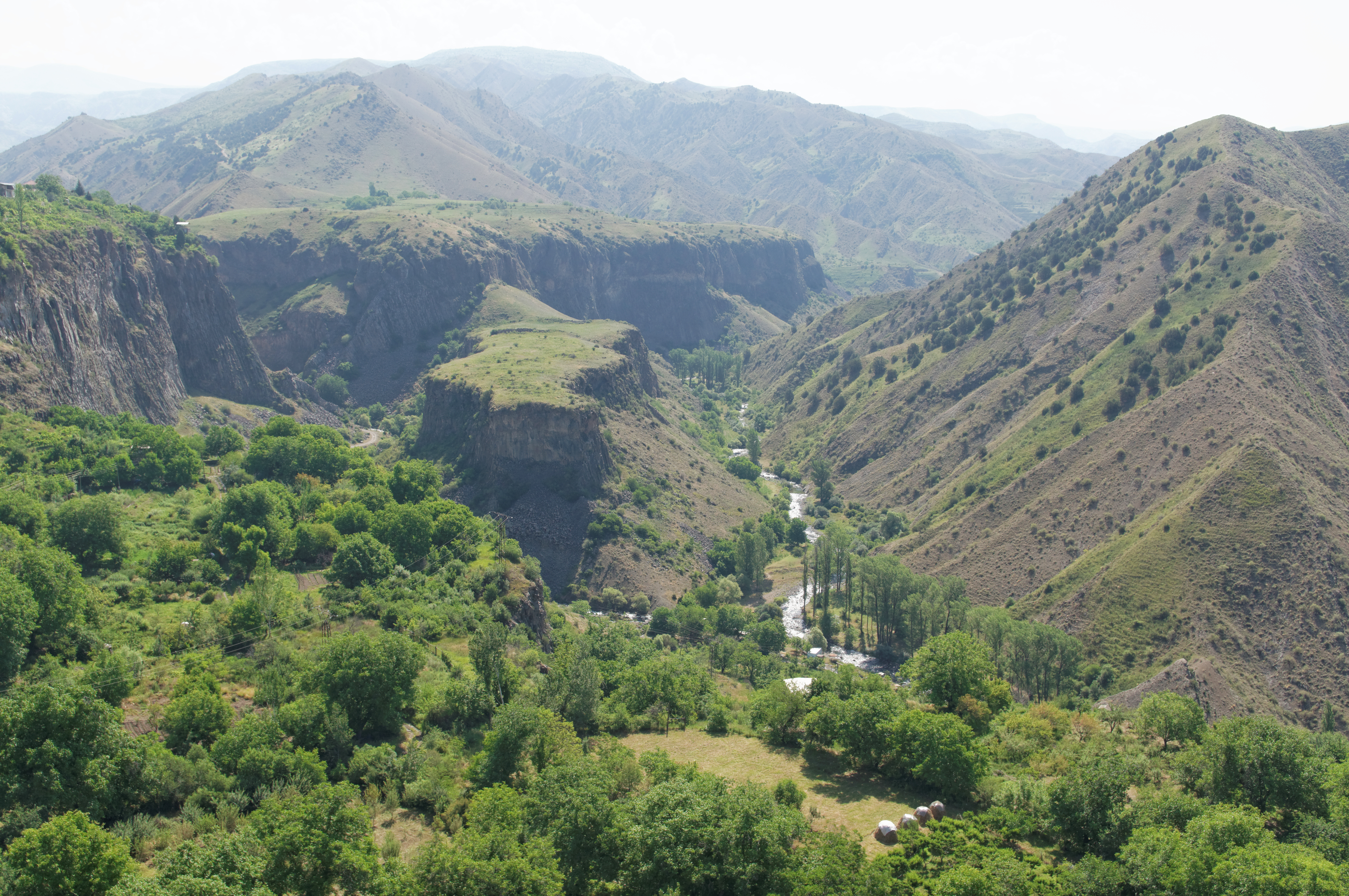
The Upper Azat Valley

== See also ==
- Geography of Armenia
- List of volcanoes in Armenia
- Mountains of Armenia
- Tourism in the Republic of Artsakh
- Transport in Armenia
- Visa policy of Armenia
