= Alapars =

Alapars Ալափարս
- Village
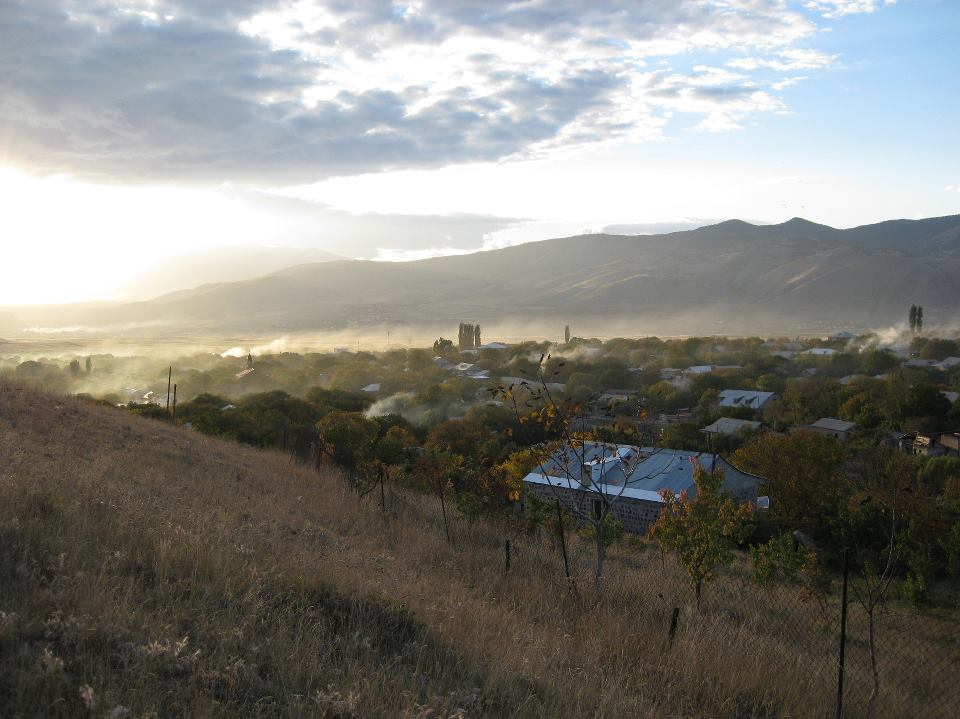
- A view of Alapars

- Location within Armenia
- Coordinates: 40°25′17″N 44°38′05″E
- Country: Armenia
- Province: Kotayk
- Founded: 470, resettled in 1828-30

Area
  - Total: 32.94 km^{2} (12.72 sq mi)
- Elevation: 1,500–1,601 m (4,921–5,253 ft)

Population (2011)
  - Total: 2,076
  - Density: 63.02/km^{2} (163.2/sq mi)
- Time zone: UTC+4 (AMT)
- Area code: +374 (226)

Alapars (Armenian: Ալափարս) is a village in the Kotayk Province of Armenia. The village has 860 dwellings, a school, house of culture, and library. The population is entirely Armenian.

== Toponymy ==
The village was previously known as Aylaberk and Aylaber.

== History ==
Alapars was founded in 470, but was resettled in 1828-30 by immigrants from Khoy and Maku. Its center is dominated by the churches of Saint Vartan (Vartanavank) built in 901 (rebuilt 19th century) by a Prince Grigor, and the Holy Mother of God (Surb Astvatsatsin) of 1897. Also in the vicinity is the monastery of S. Tsiranavor. According to local folklore, Vartanavank contains a drop of blood from the Armenian national hero Vartan Mamikonian.

== Gallery ==
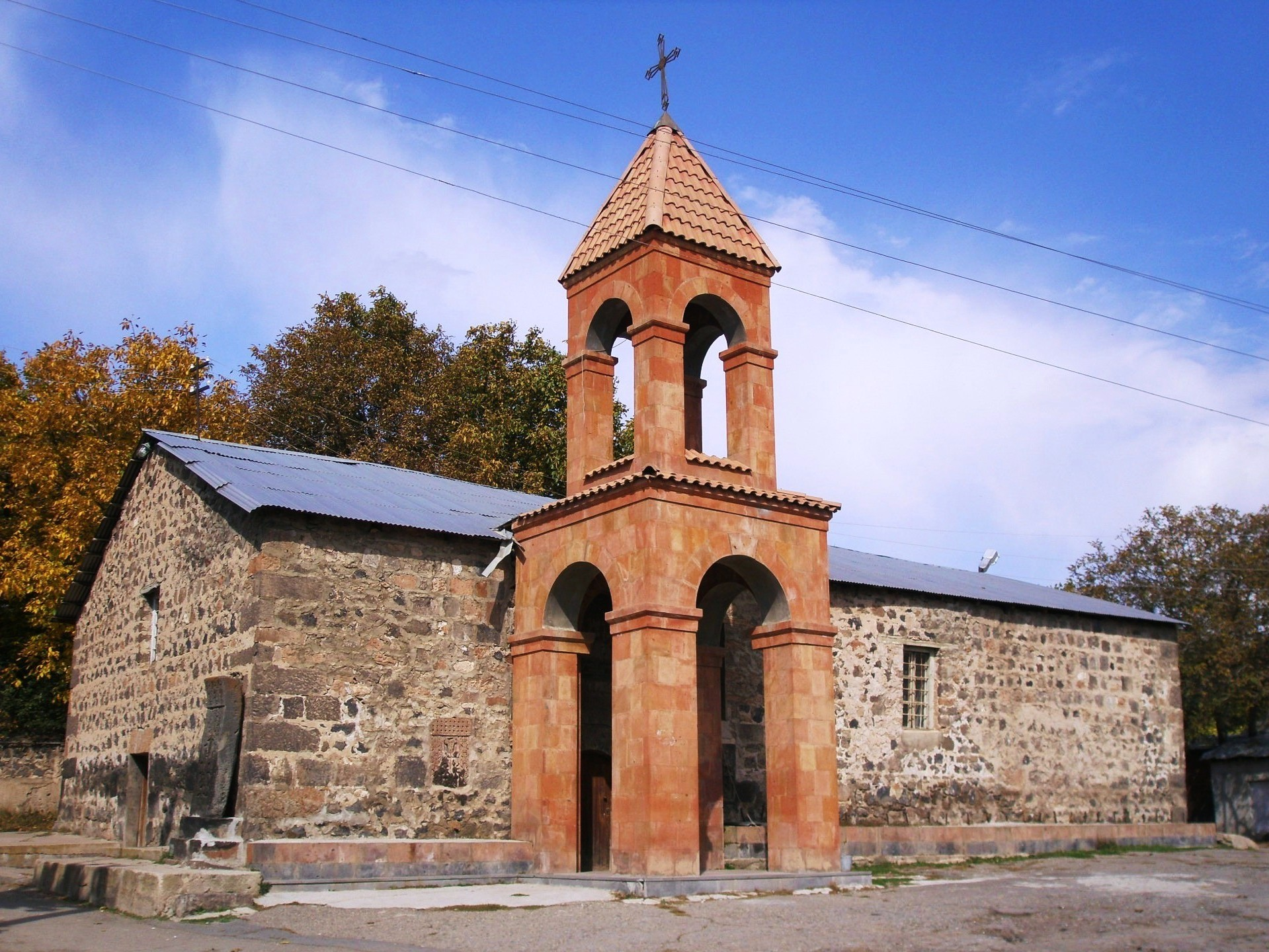
The church of Vardanavank built in 901, reconstructed in the 19th century

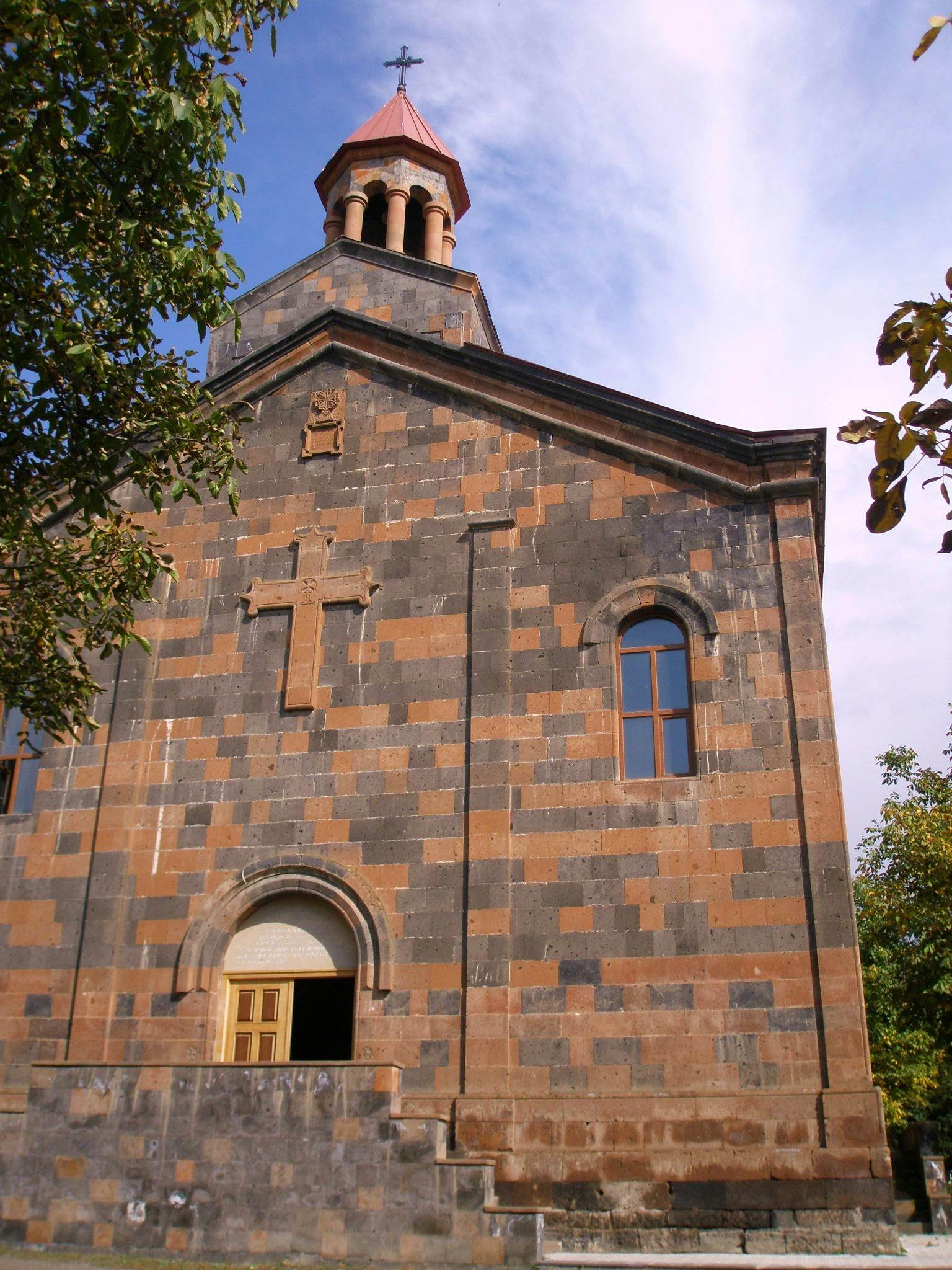
St. Astvatsatsin Church (Holy Mother of God Church), 1897

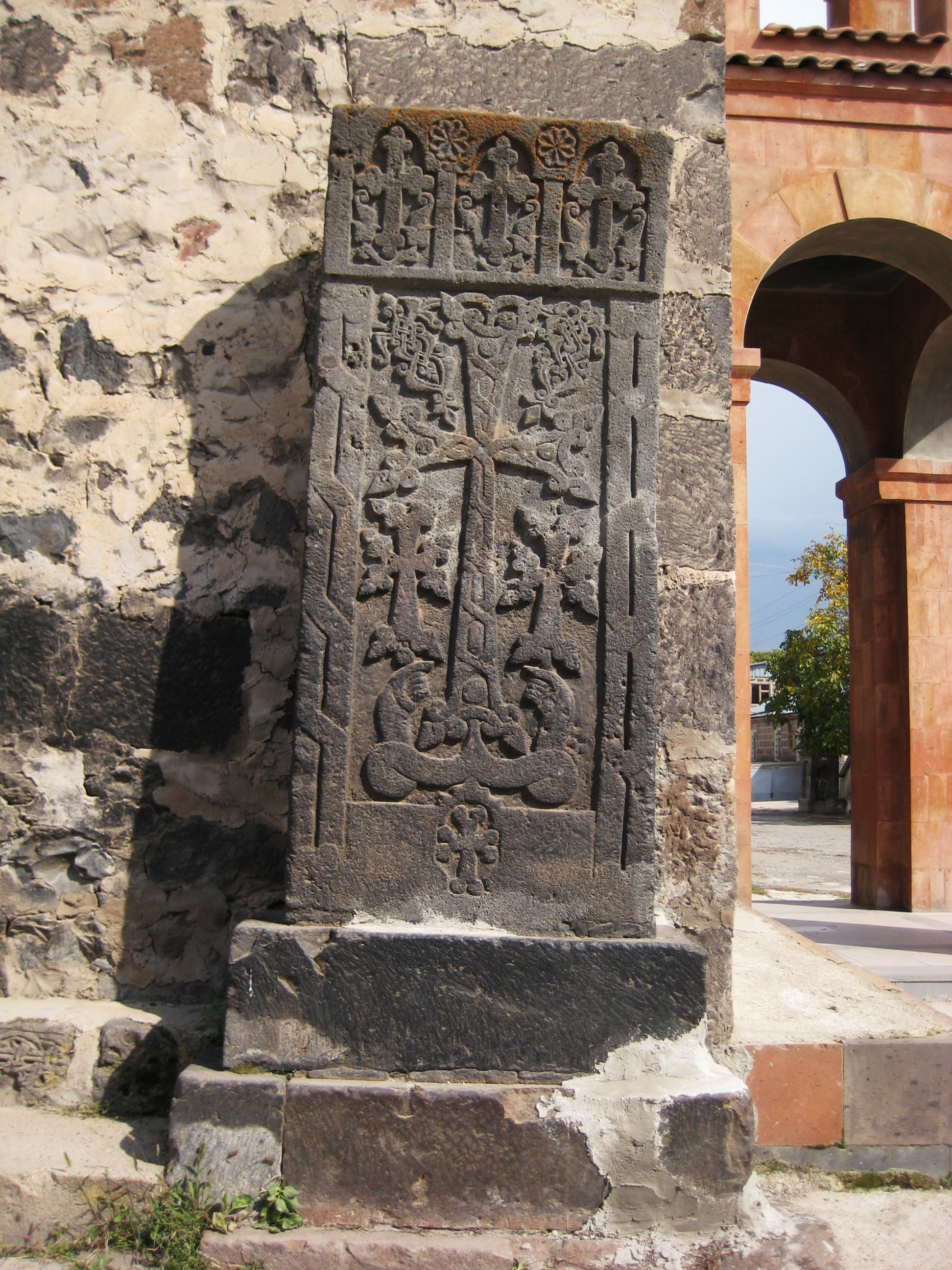
Large khachkar adjacent to Vartanavank

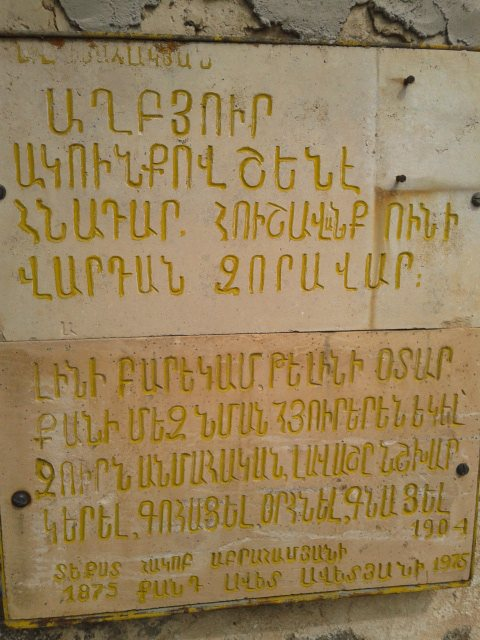
Sculpture in Tukh Manuk, Alapars by Avetik Avetyan, words by Avetik Isahakyan

== Notable people ==
- Avetik Avetyan, USSR multiple medalist and director of the pump station of Alapars
- Mushegh Aliabertsi, Patriarch (490-561)
- Tatik Saryan, artist
- Melik Kocharyan, dramatist
- Shavigh Grigoryan, folk collector
- Kavalenko Shahgaldyan, Governor of the Kotayk Province
