= Fantan, Armenia =

Village in Kotayk, Armenia

Fantan Ֆանտան
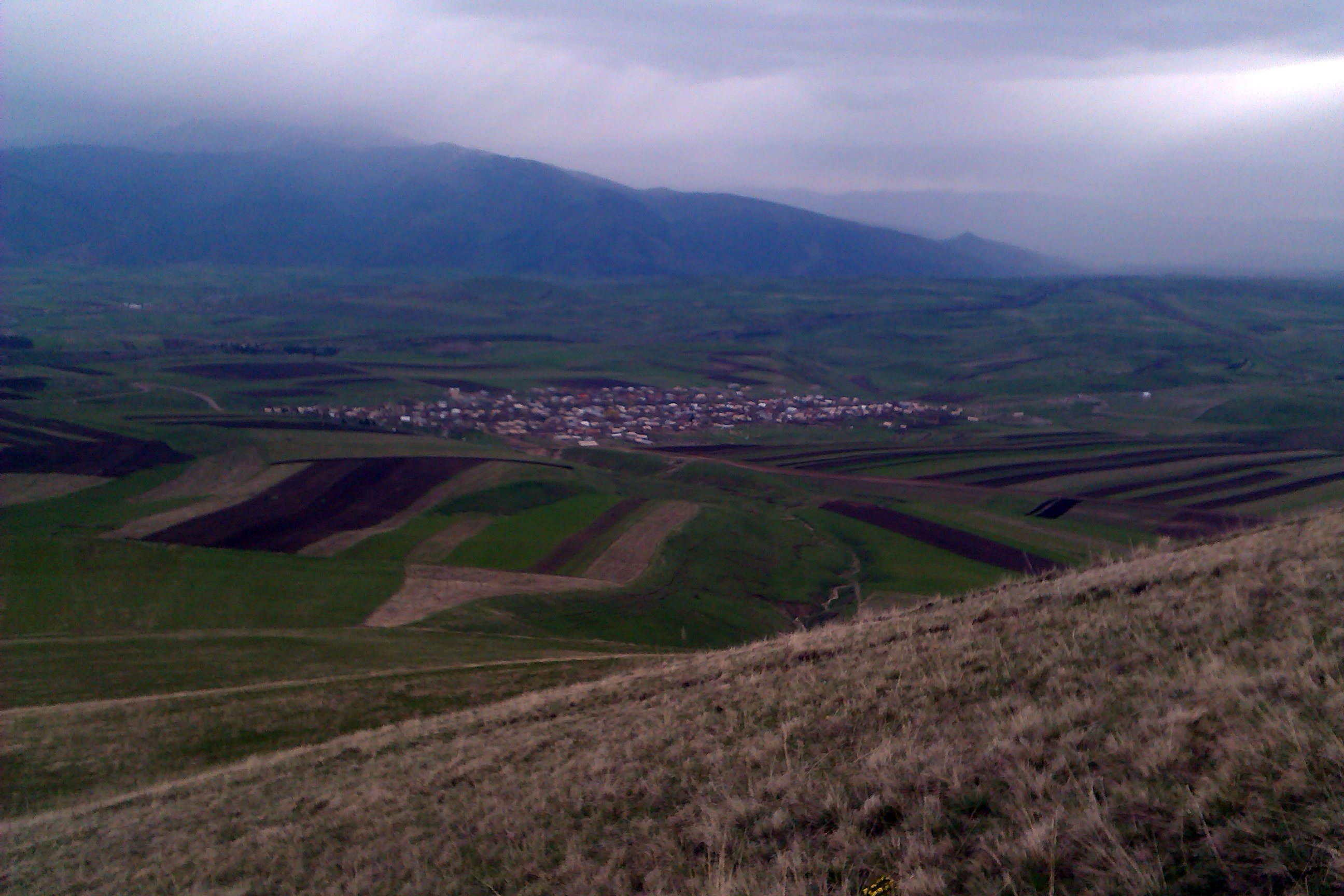
- Fantan

- Location within Armenia
- Coordinates: 40°23′39″N 44°41′06″E
- Country: Armenia
- Marz (Province): Kotayk

Population (2011)
  - Total: 930
- Time zone: UTC+4 ( )

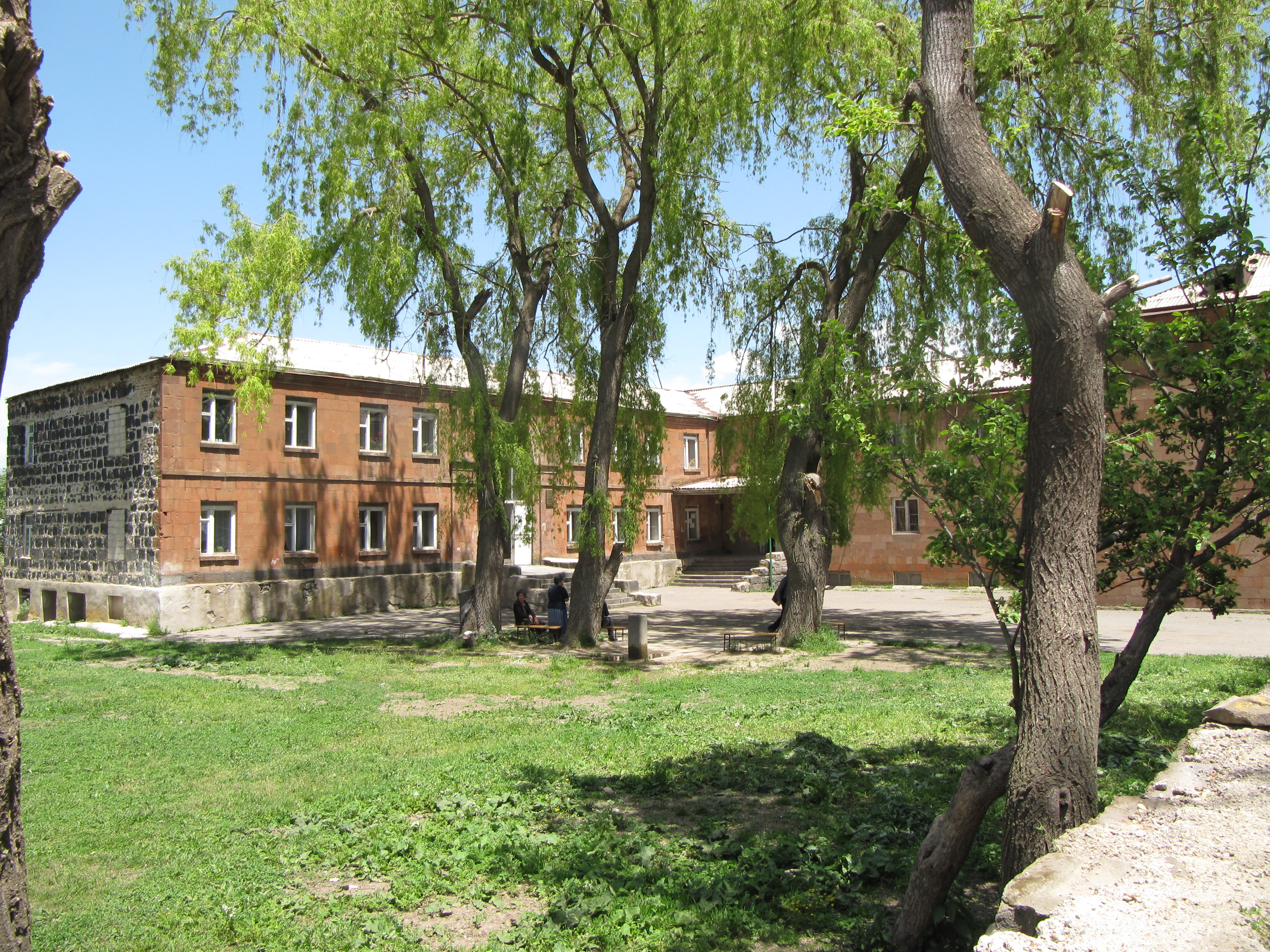
The schoolyard of Fantan's Secondary School

Fantan (Armenian: Ֆանտան), is a village in the Kotayk Province of Armenia.

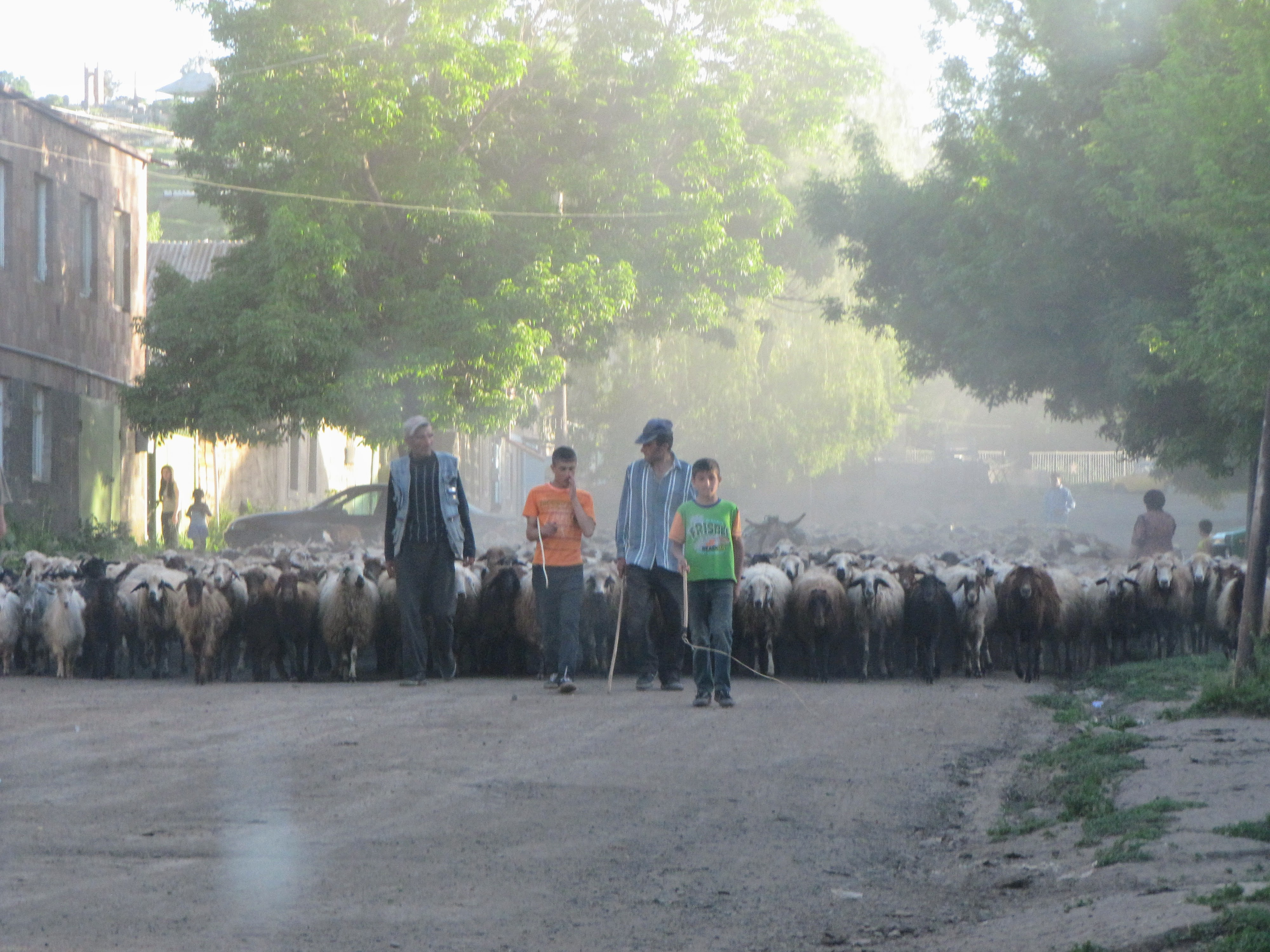
Shepherds walk their flocks home in the afternoon on the Main Street of Fantan, Armenia

Climate data for Fantan(1991-2020)
Month	Jan	Feb	Mar	Apr	May	Jun	Jul	Aug	Sep	Oct	Nov	Dec	Year
Record high °C (°F)	7.5 (45.5)	10.0 (50.0)	20.0 (68.0)	26.0 (78.8)	27.0 (80.6)	31.0 (87.8)	35.5 (95.9)	35.5 (95.9)	33.0 (91.4)	25.0 (77.0)	18.0 (64.4)	15.0 (59.0)	35.5 (95.9)
Daily mean °C (°F)	−5.7 (21.7)	−4.1 (24.6)	0.6 (33.1)	6.3 (43.3)	11.0 (51.8)	15.5 (59.9)	18.6 (65.5)	19.1 (66.4)	15.1 (59.2)	9.4 (48.9)	2.2 (36.0)	−3.3 (26.1)	7.1 (44.7)
Record low °C (°F)	−20.0 (−4.0)	−21.5 (−6.7)	−17.0 (1.4)	−15.0 (5.0)	−2.5 (27.5)	1.0 (33.8)	2.1 (35.8)	2.0 (35.6)	−1.5 (29.3)	−5.5 (22.1)	−15.0 (5.0)	−21.0 (−5.8)	−21.5 (−6.7)
Average precipitation mm (inches)	42.5 (1.67)	48.8 (1.92)	67.3 (2.65)	96.4 (3.80)	90.7 (3.57)	59.1 (2.33)	48.4 (1.91)	25.0 (0.98)	30.3 (1.19)	53.9 (2.12)	47.7 (1.88)	48.2 (1.90)	658.3 (25.92)
Average precipitation days (≥ 1.0 mm)	7.1	8	9.9	12.1	13.1	8.7	6.1	4.1	4.4	7.1	6.4	7.6	94.6
Average relative humidity (%)	77.8	73.4	70.6	69.2	70	68.8	67.9	64.3	64.2	69.5	74	78	70.6
Source: NOAA

== See also ==
- Kotayk Province
