= List of birds of Armenia =

This is a list of the bird species recorded in Armenia. The avifauna of Armenia include a total of 379 species.

This list's taxonomic treatment (designation and sequence of orders, families and species) and nomenclature (common and scientific names) follow the conventions of The Clements Checklist of Birds of the World, 2022 edition. The family accounts at the beginning of each heading reflect this taxonomy, as do the species counts found in each family account. Accidental species are included in the total species count for Armenia.

The following tags have been used to highlight several categories. The commonly occurring native species do not fall into any of these categories.

- (A) Accidental – a species that rarely or accidentally occurs in Armenia
- (Ex) Extirpated – a species that no longer occurs in Armenia although populations exist elsewhere

== Ducks, geese, and waterfowl ==
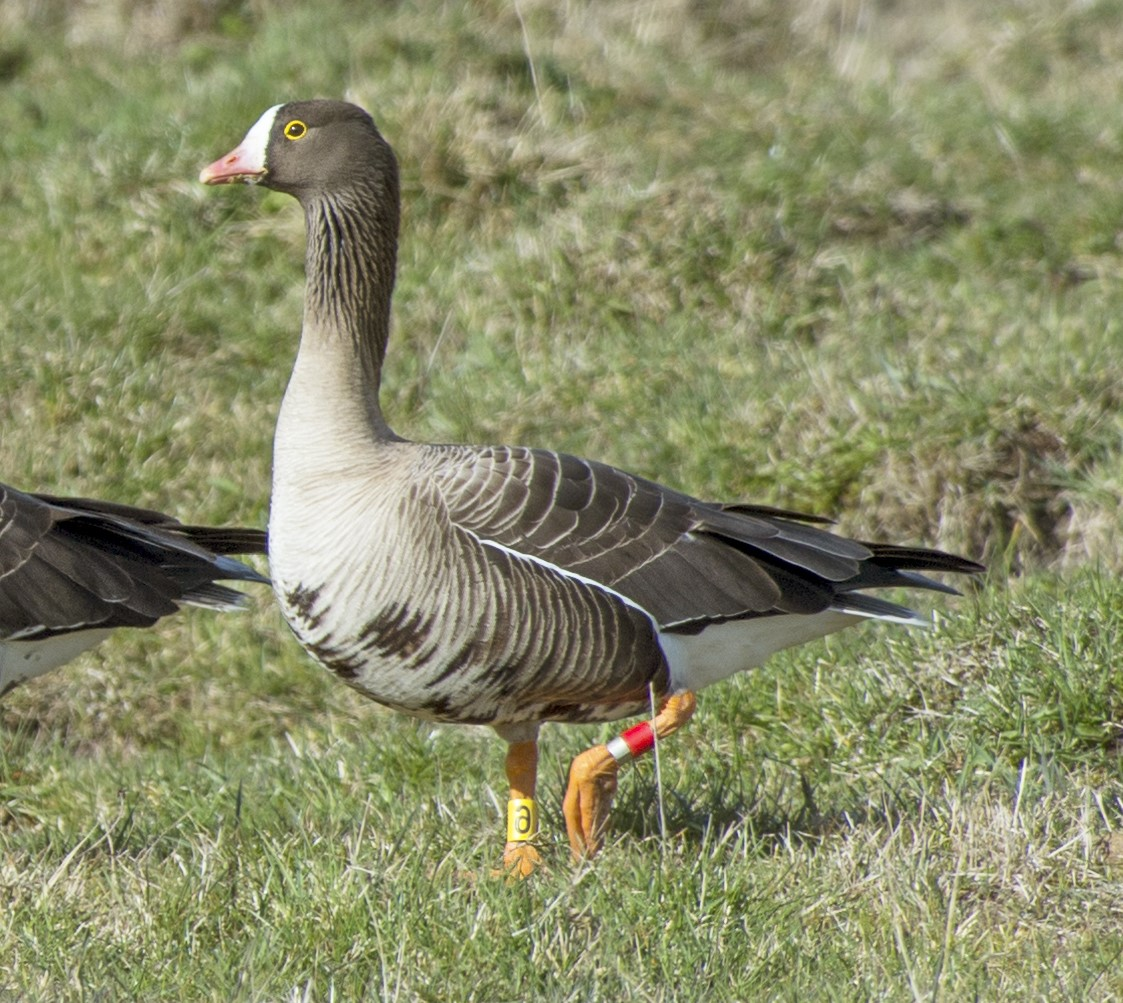
Lesser white-fronted goose

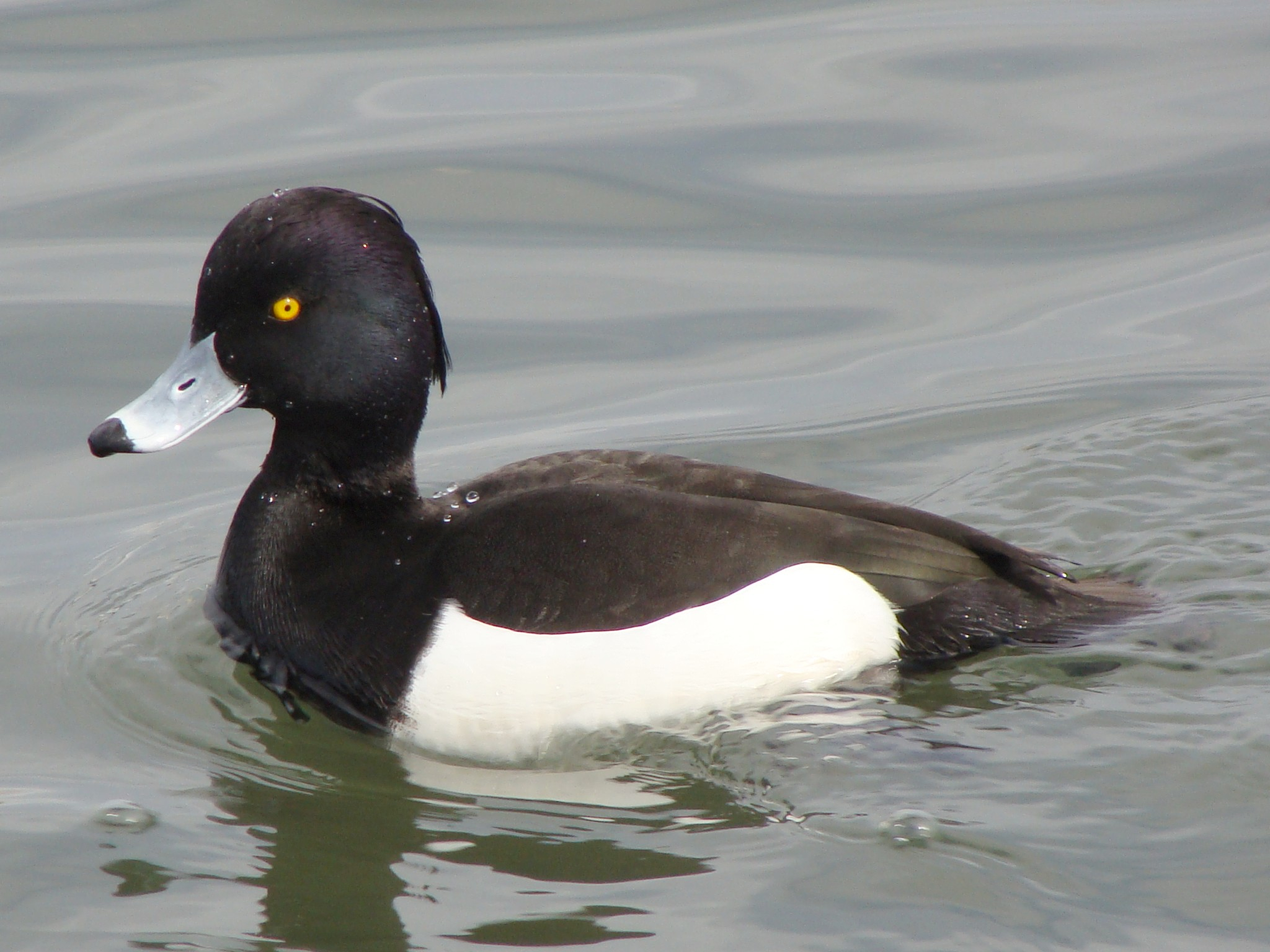
Tufted duck

Order: Anseriformes Family: Anatidae

Anatidae includes the ducks and most duck-like waterfowl, such as geese and swans. These birds are adapted to an aquatic existence with webbed feet, flattened bills, and feathers that are excellent at shedding water due to an oily coating.

- Greylag goose, Anser anser
- Greater white-fronted goose, Anser albifrons
- Lesser white-fronted goose, Anser erythropus
- Red-breasted goose, Branta ruficollis
- Mute swan, Cygnus olor
- Tundra swan, Cygnus columbianus
- Whooper swan, Cygnus cygnus
- Ruddy shelduck, Tadorna ferruginea
- Common shelduck, Tadorna tadorna
- Garganey, Spatula querquedula
- Northern shoveler, Spatula clypeata
- Gadwall, Mareca strepera
- Eurasian wigeon, Mareca penelope
- Mallard, Anas platyrhynchos
- Northern pintail, Anas acuta
- Eurasian teal, Anas crecca
- Marbled teal, Marmaronetta angustirostris
- Red-crested pochard, Netta rufina
- Common pochard, Aythya ferina
- Ferruginous duck, Aythya nyroca
- Tufted duck, Aythya fuligula
- Greater scaup, Aythya marila
- Velvet scoter, Melanitta fusca (Ex)
- Common scoter, Melanitta nigra (A)
- Long-tailed duck, Clangula hyemalis (A)
- Common goldeneye, Bucephala clangula
- Smew, Mergellus albellus
- Common merganser, Mergus merganser
- Red-breasted merganser, Mergus serrator
- White-headed duck, Oxyura leucocephala

== Pheasants, grouse, and allies ==
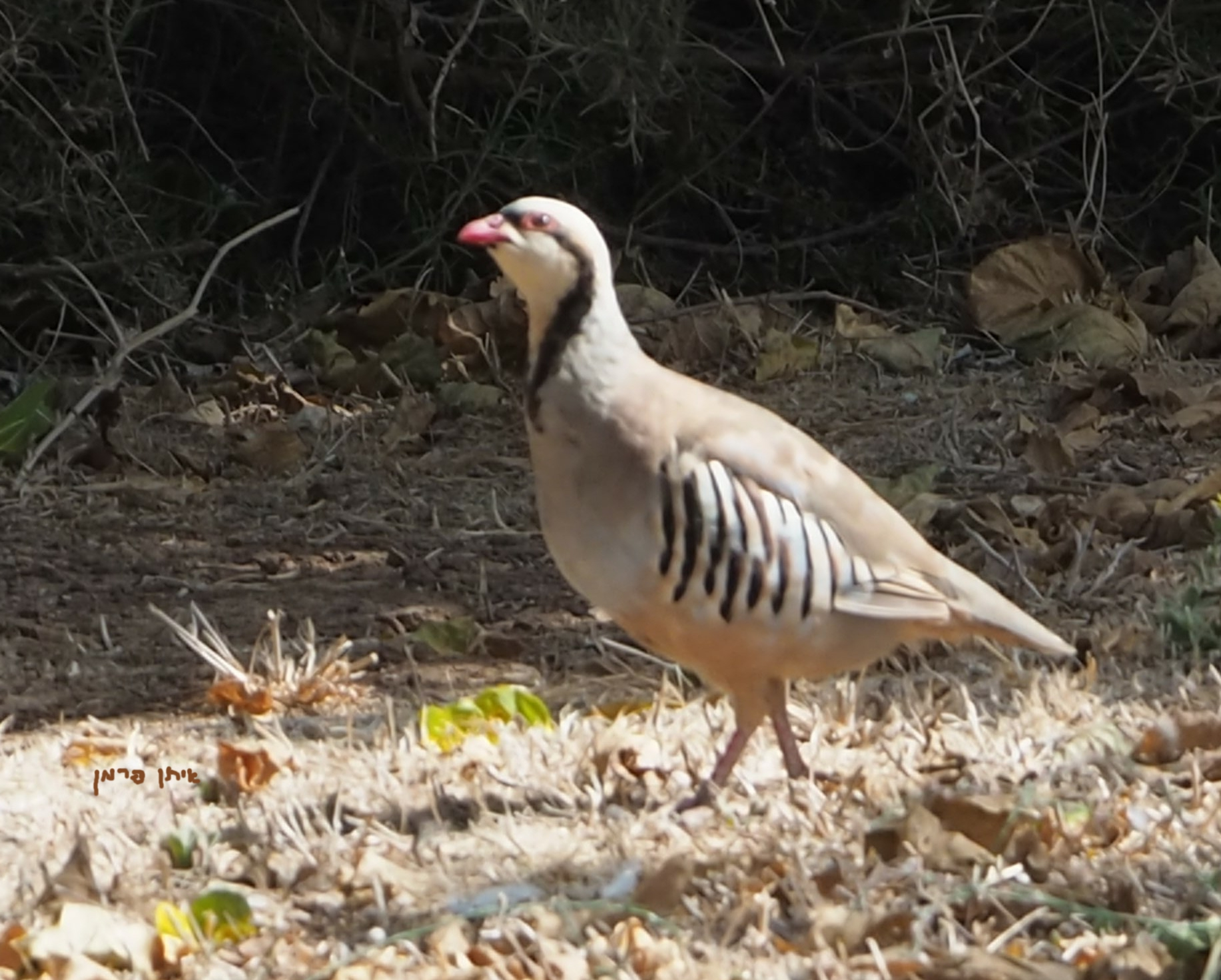
Chukar

Order: Galliformes Family: Phasianidae

The Phasianidae are a family of terrestrial birds. In general, they are plump (although they vary in size) and have broad, relatively short wings.

- See-see partridge, Ammoperdix griseogularis
- Common quail, Coturnix coturnix
- Chukar, Alectoris chukar
- Caspian snowcock, Tetraogallus caspius
- Black francolin, Francolinus francolinus
- Common pheasant, Phasianus colchicus
- Grey partridge, Perdix perdix
- Caucasian grouse, Lyrurus mlokosiewiczi

== Flamingos ==
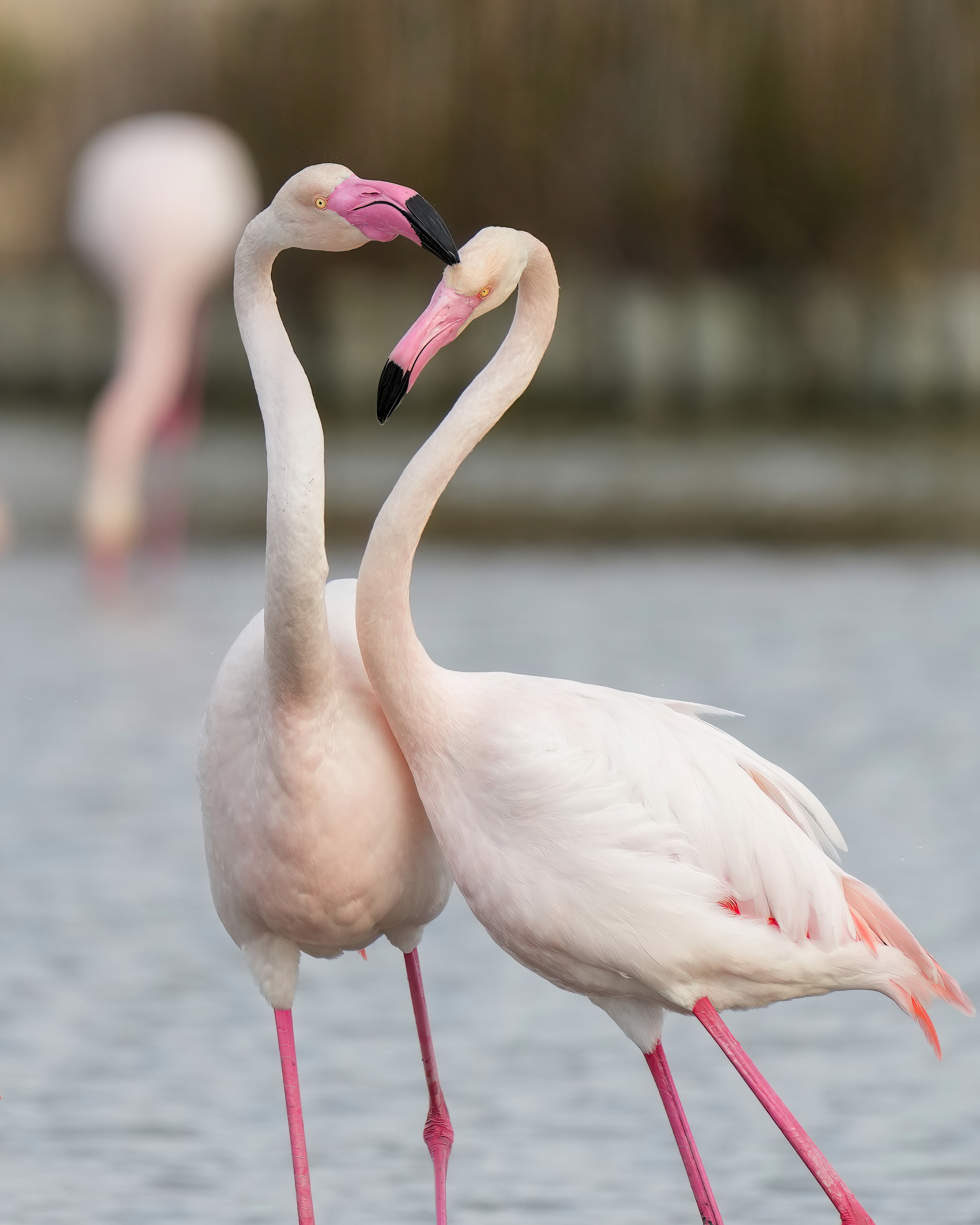
Greater flamingo

Order: Phoenicopteriformes Family: Phoenicopteridae

Flamingos are gregarious wading birds, usually 1 to 1.5 metres (3 to 5 ft) tall, found in both the Western and Eastern Hemispheres. Flamingos filter-feed on shellfish and algae. Their oddly shaped beaks are specially adapted to separate mud and silt from the food they consume and, uniquely, are used upside-down.

- Greater flamingo, Phoenicopterus roseus

== Grebes ==
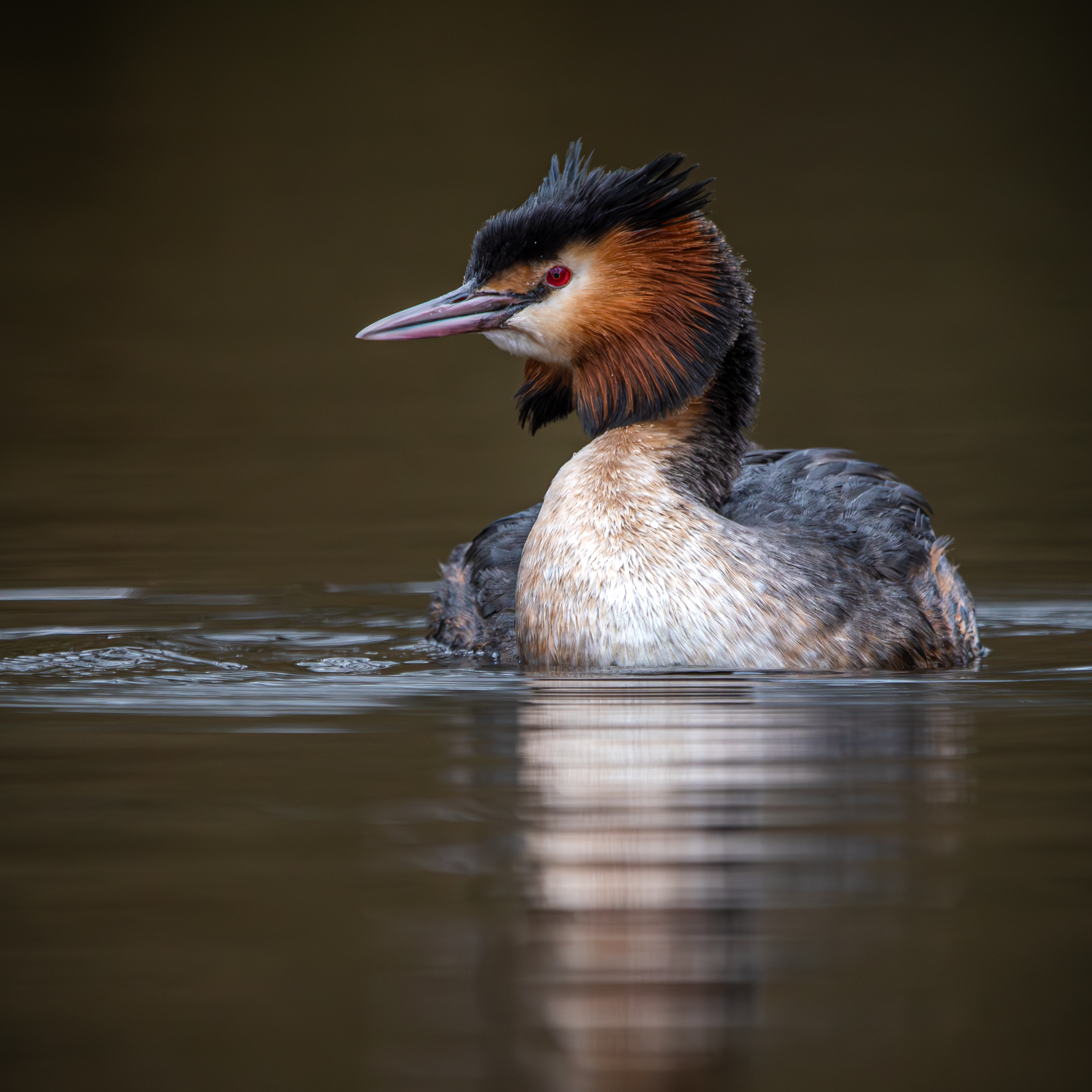
Great crested grebe

Order: Podicipediformes Family: Podicipedidae

Grebes are small to medium-large freshwater diving birds. They have lobed toes and are excellent swimmers and divers. However, they have their feet placed far back on the body, making them quite ungainly on land.

- Little grebe, Tachybaptus ruficollis
- Slavonian grebe, Podiceps auritus
- Red-necked grebe, Podiceps grisegena
- Great crested grebe, Podiceps cristatus
- Black-necked grebe, Podiceps nigricollis

== Pigeons and doves ==
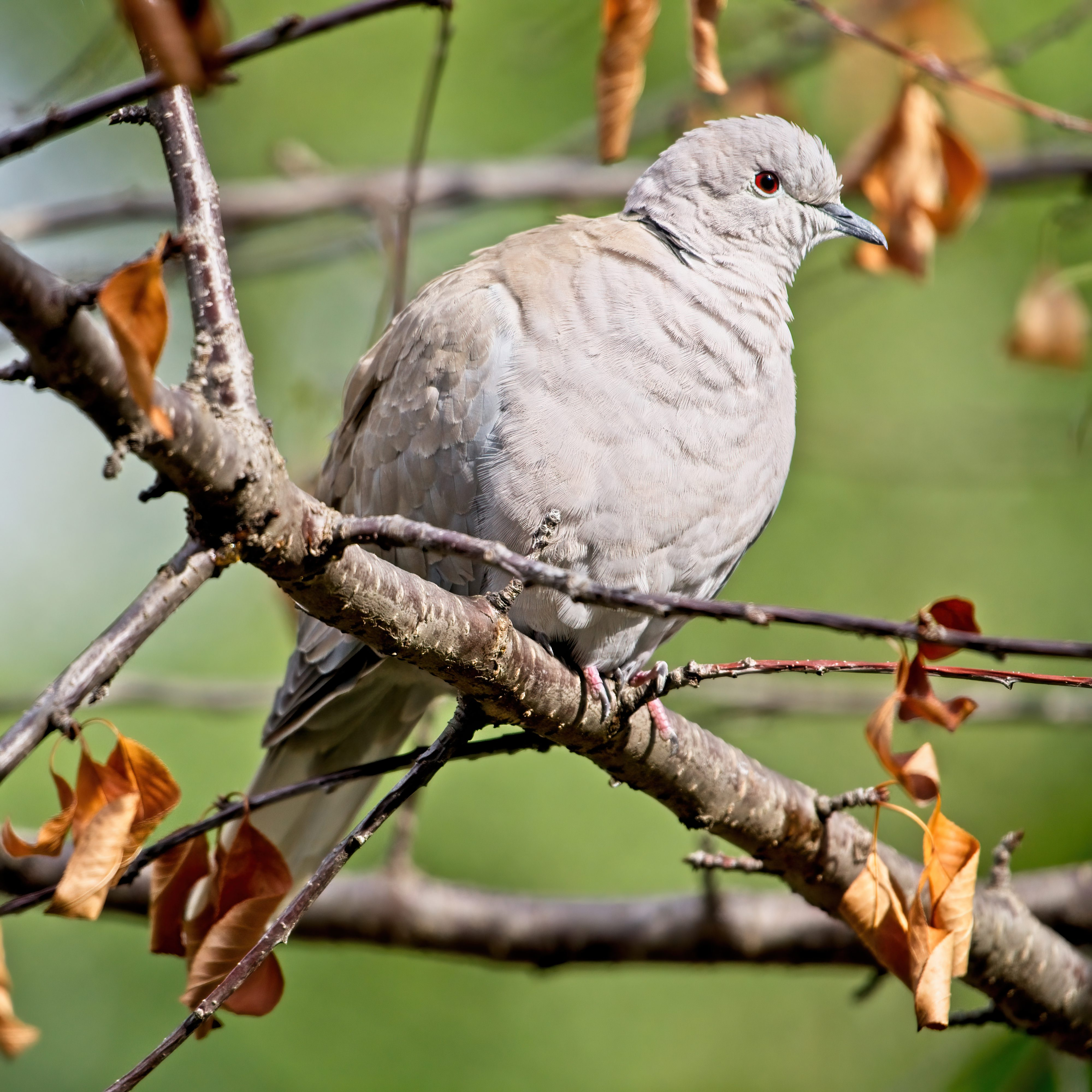
Eurasian collared dove

Order: Columbiformes Family: Columbidae

Pigeons and doves are stout-bodied birds with short necks and short slender bills with a fleshy cere.

- Rock pigeon, Columba livia
- Stock dove, Columba oenas
- Common wood pigeon, Columba palumbus
- European turtle dove, Streptopelia turtur
- Eurasian collared dove, Streptopelia decaocto
- Laughing dove, Spilopelia senegalensi
- Namaqua dove, Oena capensis (A)

== Sandgrouse ==
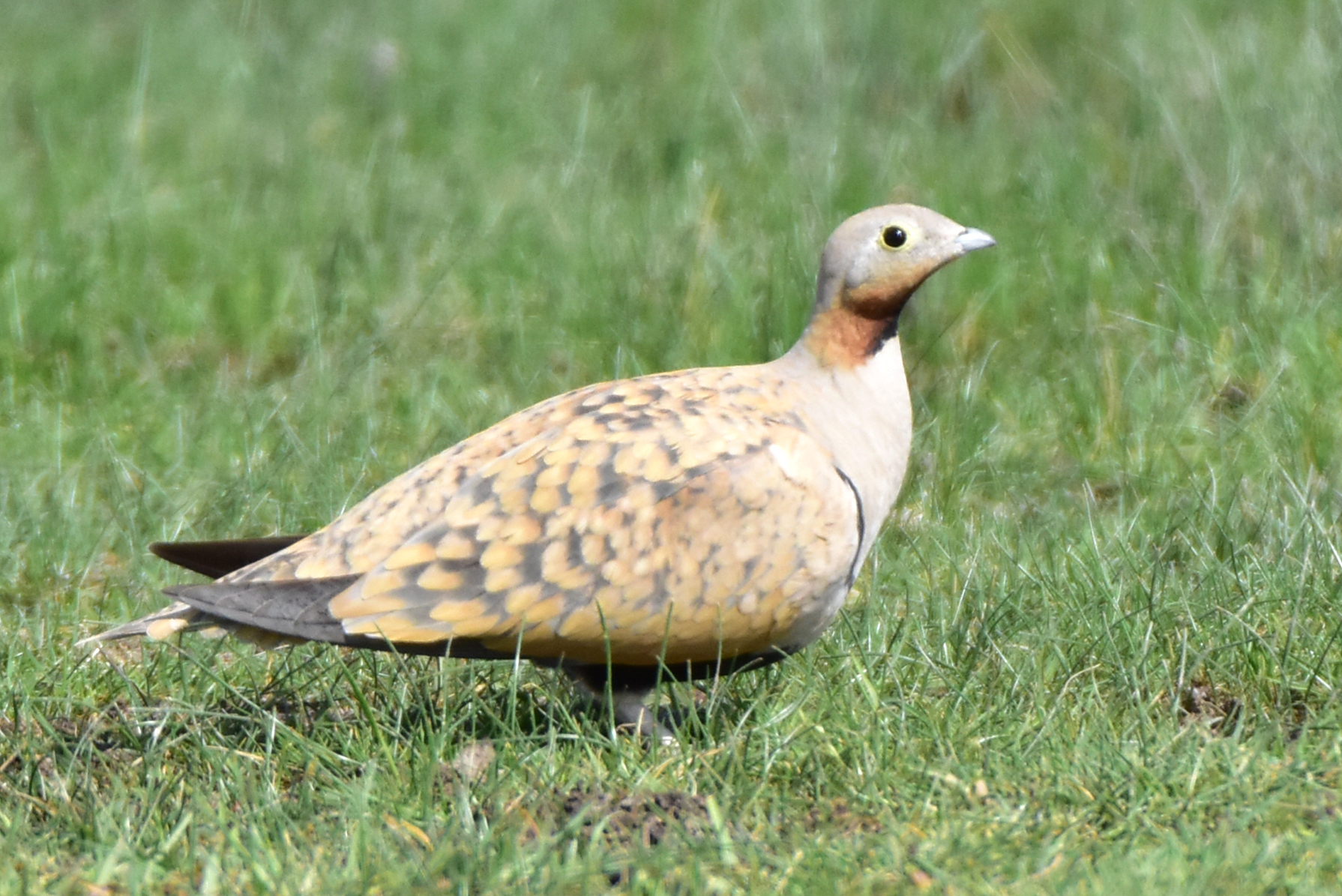
Black-bellied sandgrouse

Order: Pterocliformes Family: Pteroclidae

Sandgrouse have small, pigeon like heads and necks, but sturdy compact bodies. They have long pointed wings and sometimes tails and a fast direct flight. Flocks fly to watering holes at dawn and dusk. Their legs are feathered down to the toes.

- Pin-tailed sandgrouse, Pterocles alchata (A)
- Black-bellied sandgrouse, Pterocles orientalis

== Bustards ==
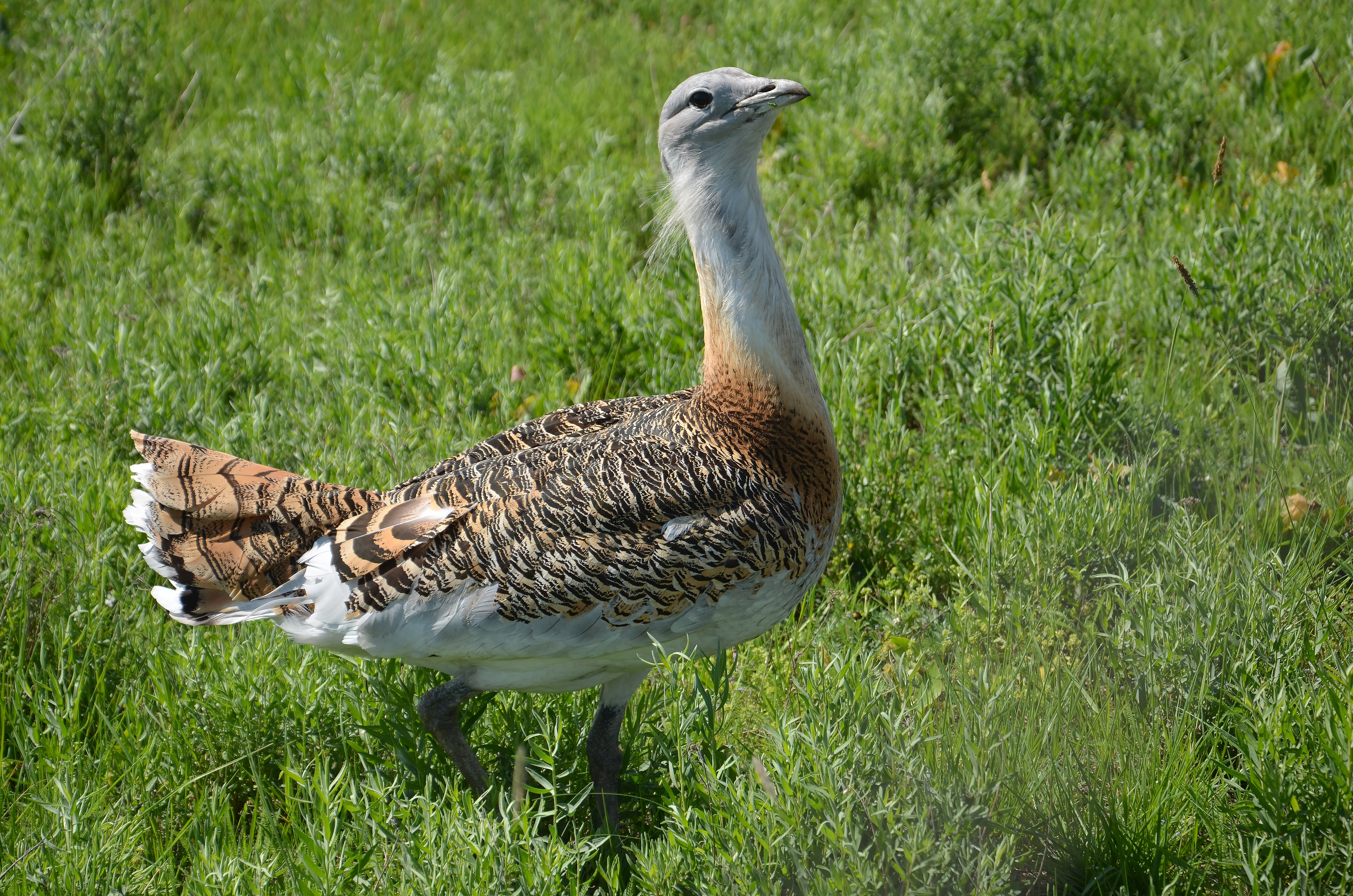
Great bustard

Order: Otidiformes Family: Otididae

Bustards are large terrestrial birds mainly associated with dry open country and steppes in the Old World. They are omnivorous and nest on the ground. They walk steadily on strong legs and big toes, pecking for food as they go. They have long broad wings with "fingered" wingtips and striking patterns in flight. Many have interesting mating displays.

- Great bustard, Otis tarda
- MacQueen's bustard, Chlamydotis macqueenii (Ex)
- Little bustard, Tetrax tetrax

== Cuckoos ==
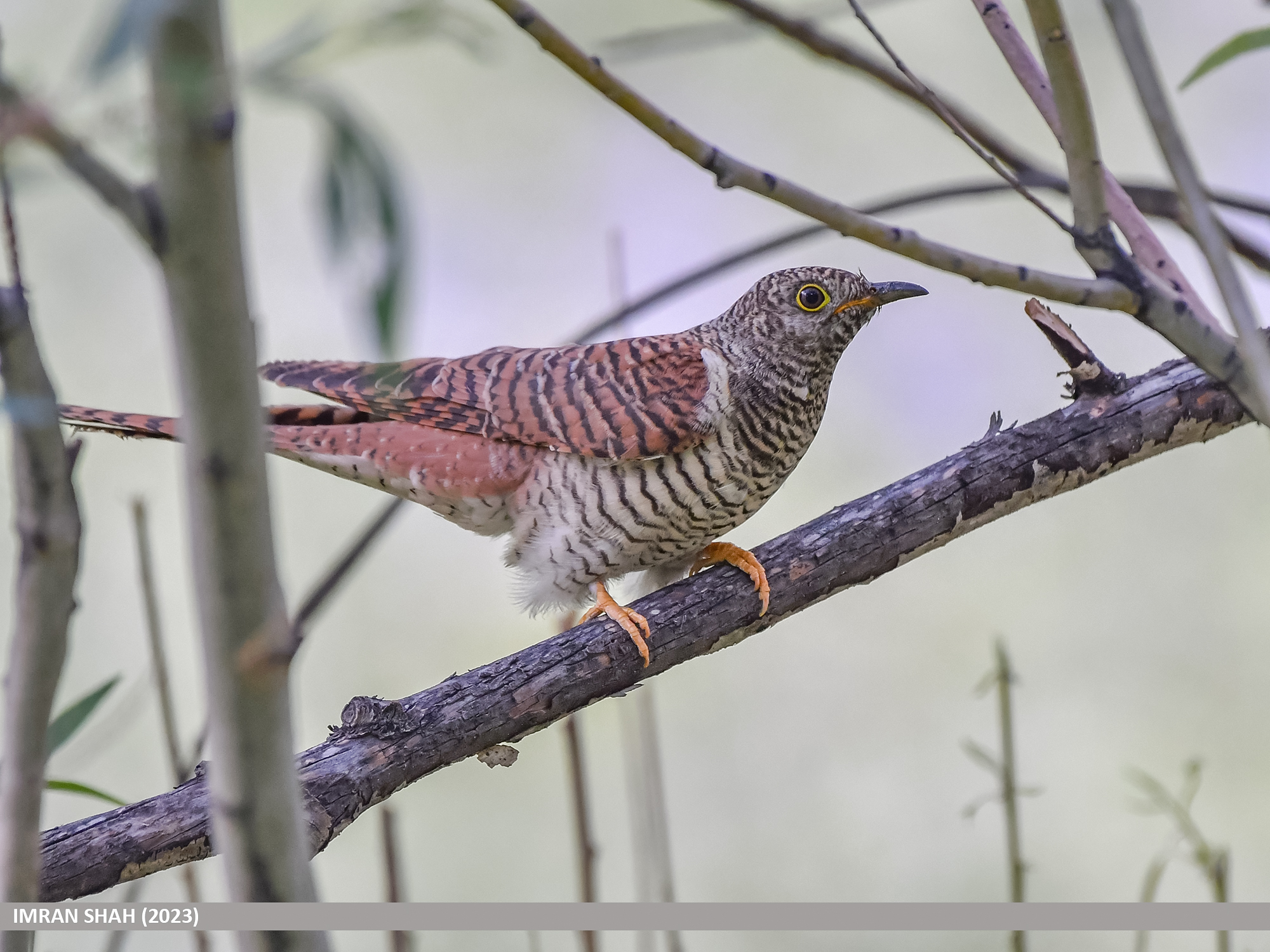
Common cuckoo

Order: Cuculiformes Family: Cuculidae

The family Cuculidae includes cuckoos, roadrunners and anis. These birds are of variable size with slender bodies, long tails and strong legs.

- Great spotted cuckoo, Clamator glandarius
- Common cuckoo, Cuculus canorus

== Nightjars ==
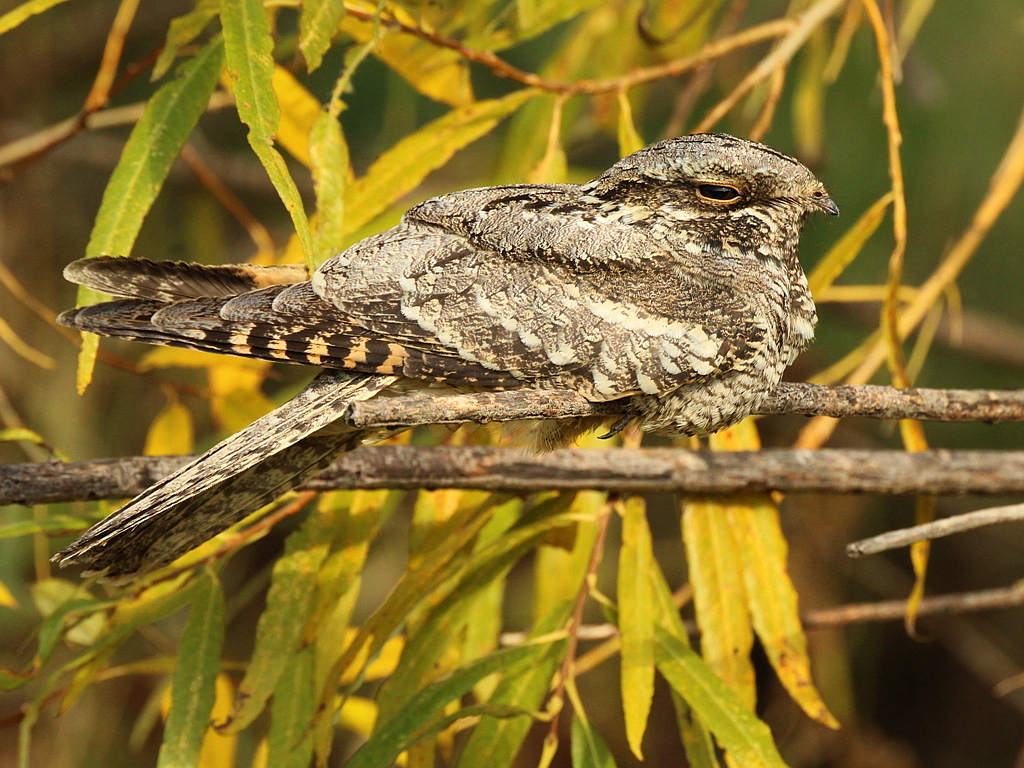
Eurasian nightjar

Order: Caprimulgiformes Family: Caprimulgidae

Nightjars are medium-sized nocturnal birds that usually nest on the ground. They have long wings, short legs and very short bills. Most have small feet, of little use for walking, and long pointed wings. Their soft plumage is camouflaged to resemble bark or leaves.

- Eurasian nightjar, Caprimulgus europaeus

== Swifts ==
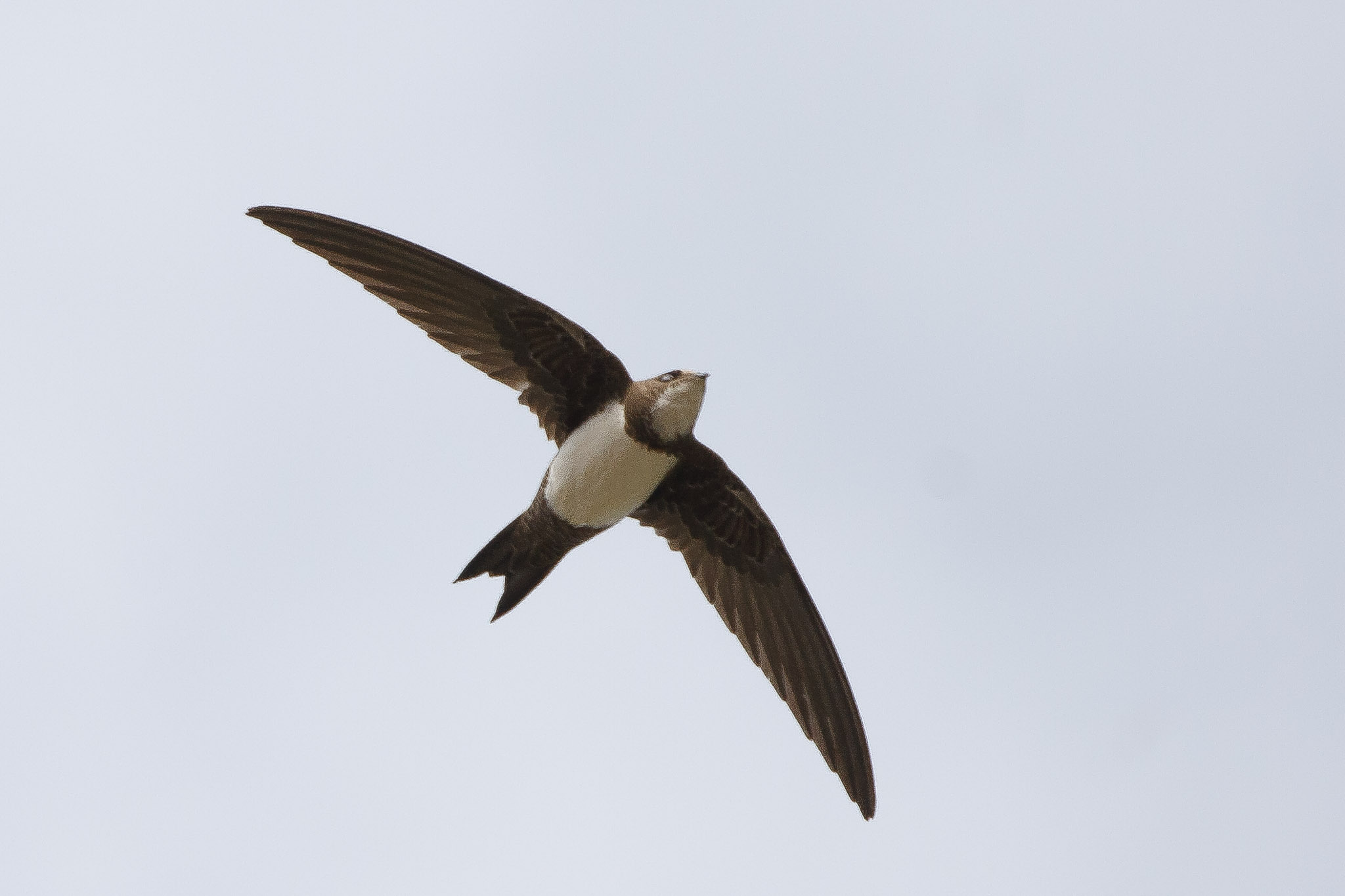
Alpine swift

Order: Caprimulgiformes Family: Apodidae

Swifts are small birds which spend the majority of their lives flying. These birds have very short legs and never settle voluntarily on the ground, perching instead only on vertical surfaces. Many swifts have long swept-back wings which resemble a crescent or boomerang.

- Alpine swift, Apus melba
- Common swift, Apus apus

== Rails, gallinules, and coots ==
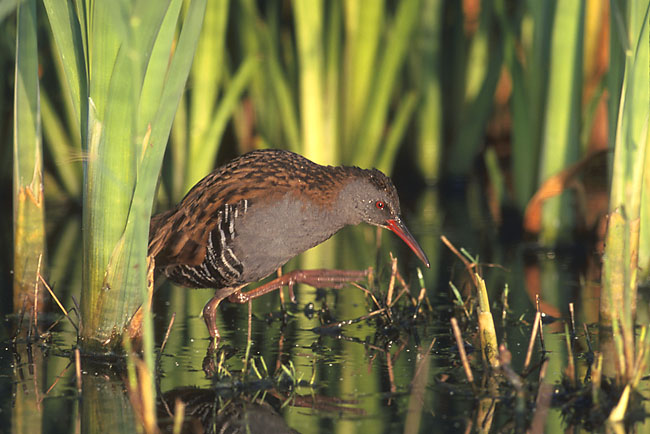
Water rail

Order: Gruiformes Family: Rallidae

Rallidae is a large family of small to medium-sized birds which includes the rails, crakes, coots and gallinules. Typically they inhabit dense vegetation in damp environments near lakes, swamps or rivers. In general they are shy and secretive birds, making them difficult to observe. Most species have strong legs and long toes which are well adapted to soft uneven surfaces. They tend to have short, rounded wings and to be weak fliers.

- Water rail, Rallus aquaticus
- Corn crake, Crex crex
- Spotted crake, Porzana porzana
- Eurasian moorhen, Gallinula chloropus
- Eurasian coot, Fulica atra
- Grey-headed swamphen, Porphyrio poliocephalus
- Little crake, Zapornia parva
- Baillon's crake, Zapornia pusilla (A)

== Cranes ==
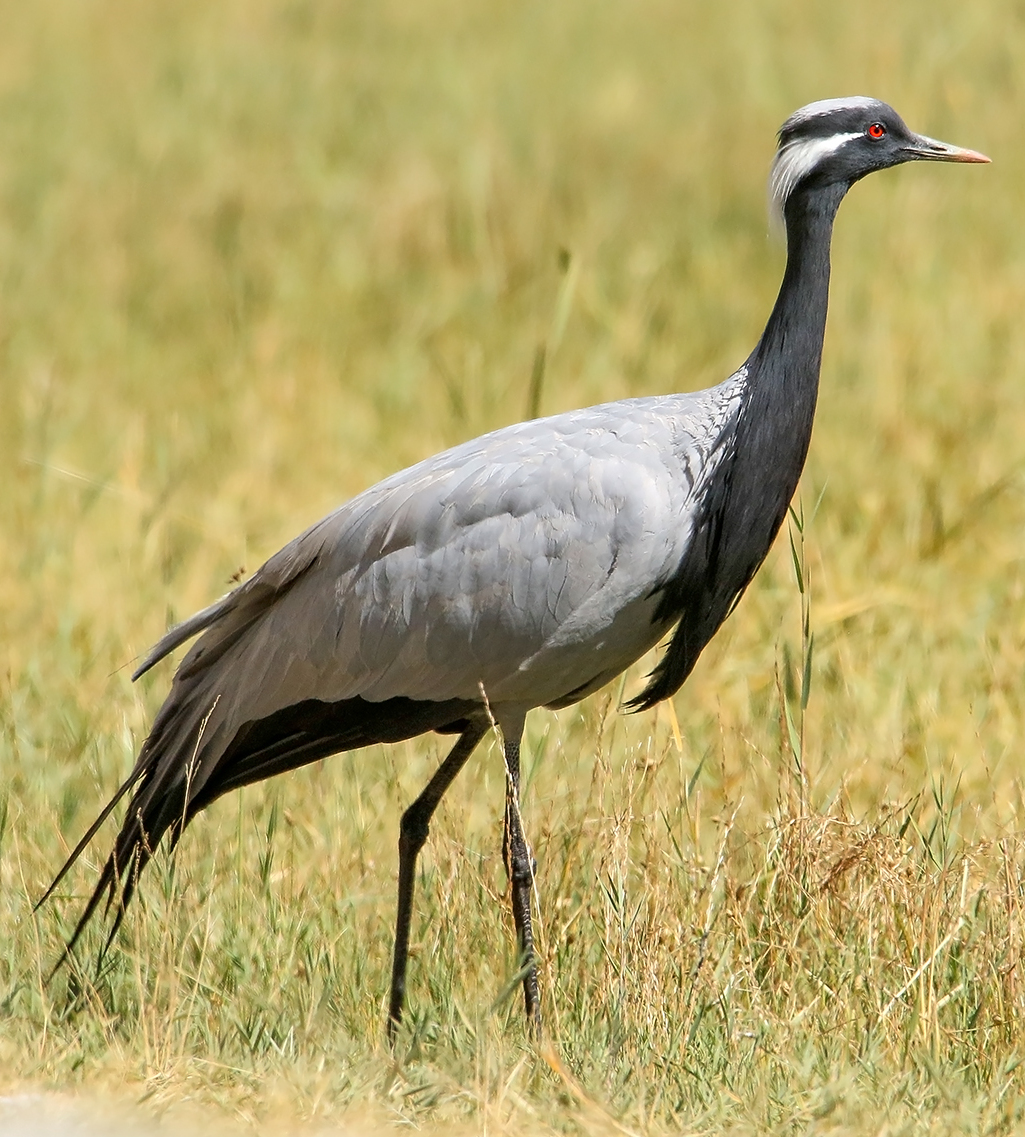
Demoiselle crane

Order: Gruiformes Family: Gruidae

Cranes are large, long-legged and long-necked birds. Unlike the similar-looking but unrelated herons, cranes fly with necks outstretched, not pulled back. Most have elaborate and noisy courting displays or "dances".

- Demoiselle crane, Anthropoides virgo
- Common crane, Grus grus

== Stone-curlews ==
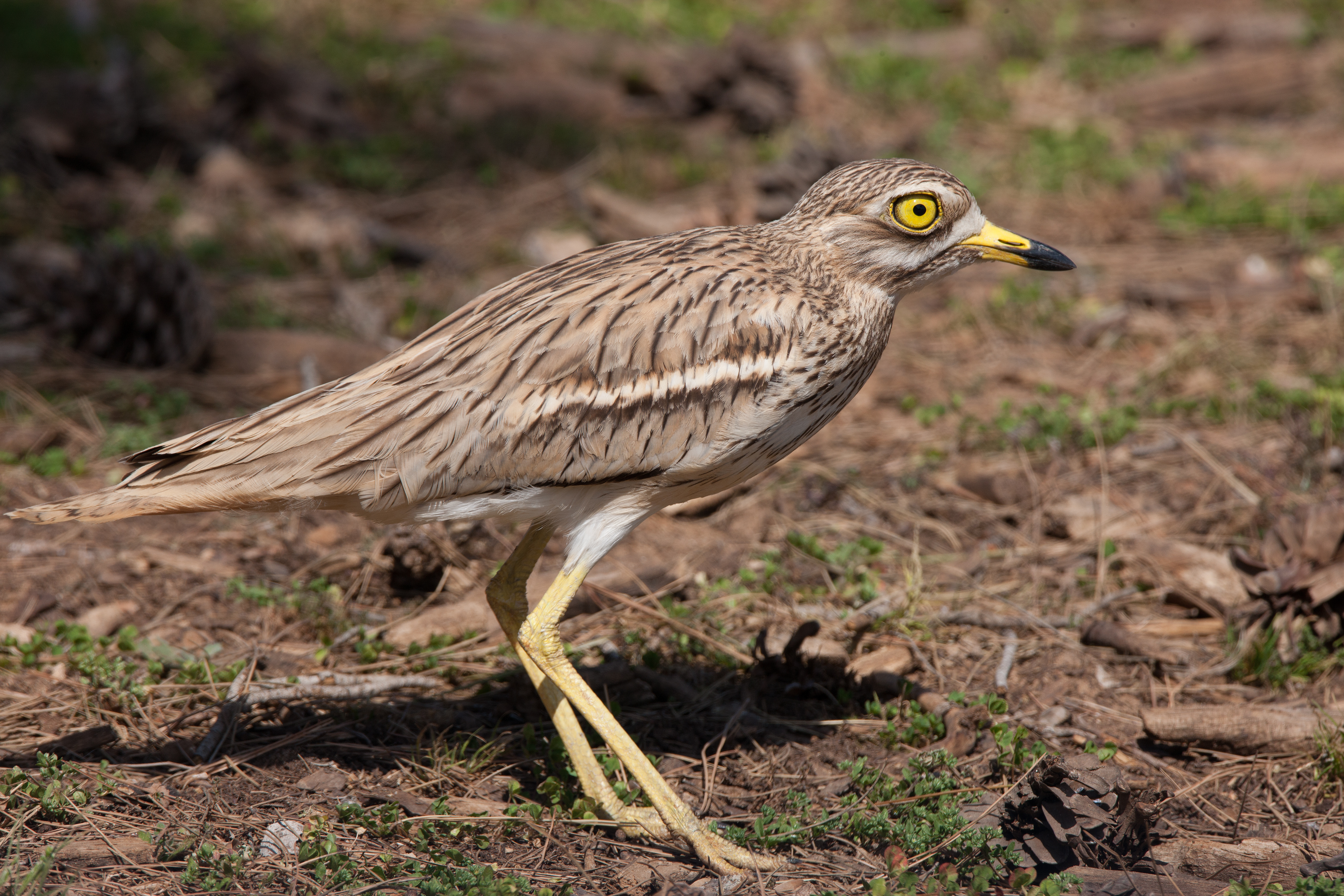
Eurasian stone-curlew

Order: Charadriiformes Family: Burhinidae

The stone-curlews and thick-knees are a group of largely tropical waders in the family Burhinidae. They are found worldwide within the tropical zone, with some species also breeding in temperate Europe and Australia. They are medium to large waders with strong black or yellow-black bills, large yellow eyes and cryptic plumage. Despite being classed as waders, most species have a preference for arid or semi-arid habitats.

- Eurasian stone-curlew, Burhinus oedicnemus (A)

== Stilts and avocets ==
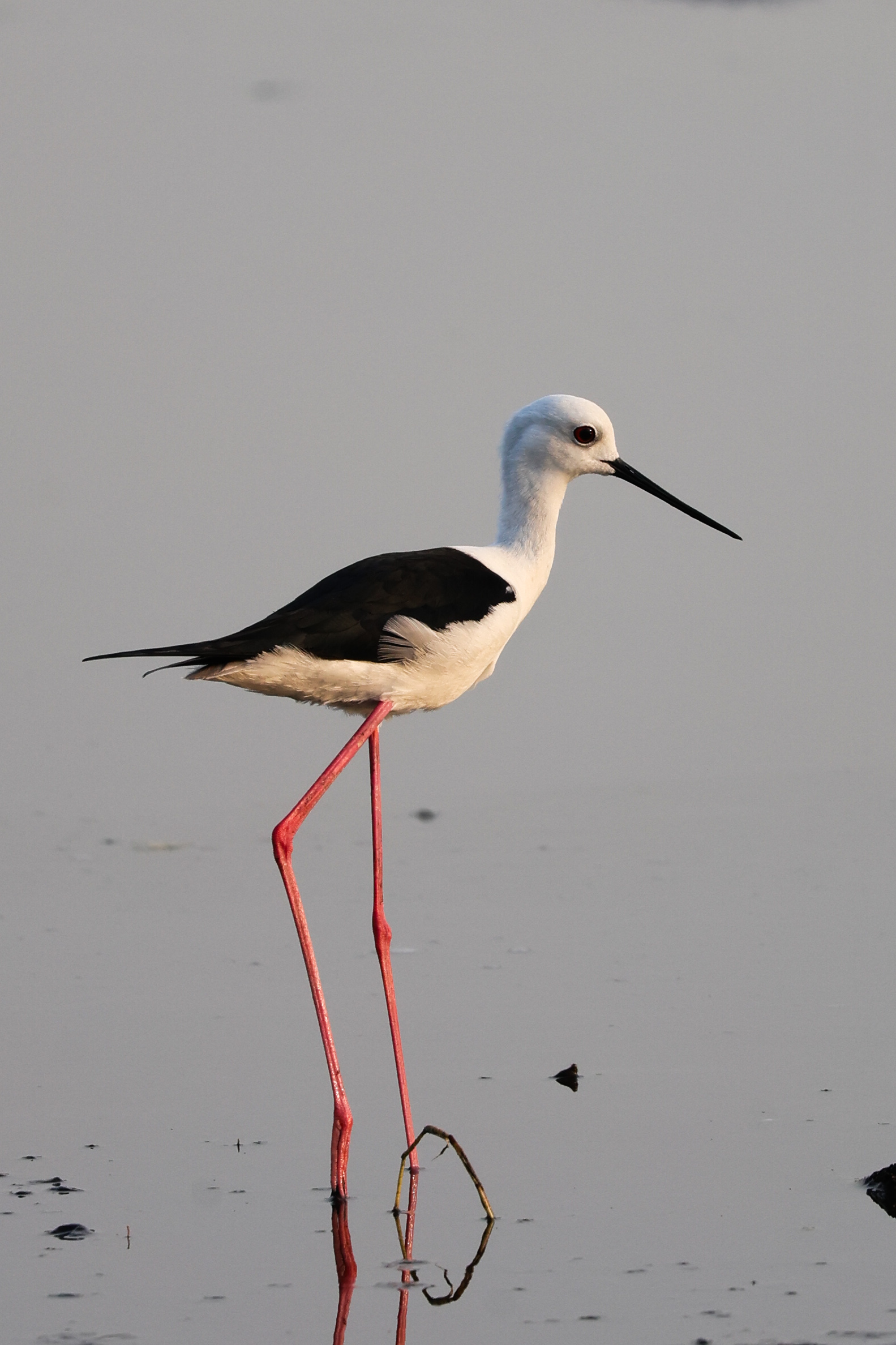
Black-winged stilt

Order: Charadriiformes Family: Recurvirostridae

Recurvirostridae is a family of large wading birds, which includes the avocets and stilts. The avocets have long legs and long up-curved bills. The stilts have extremely long legs and long, thin, straight bills.

- Black-winged stilt, Himantopus himantopus
- Pied avocet, Recurvirostra avosetta

== Oystercatchers ==
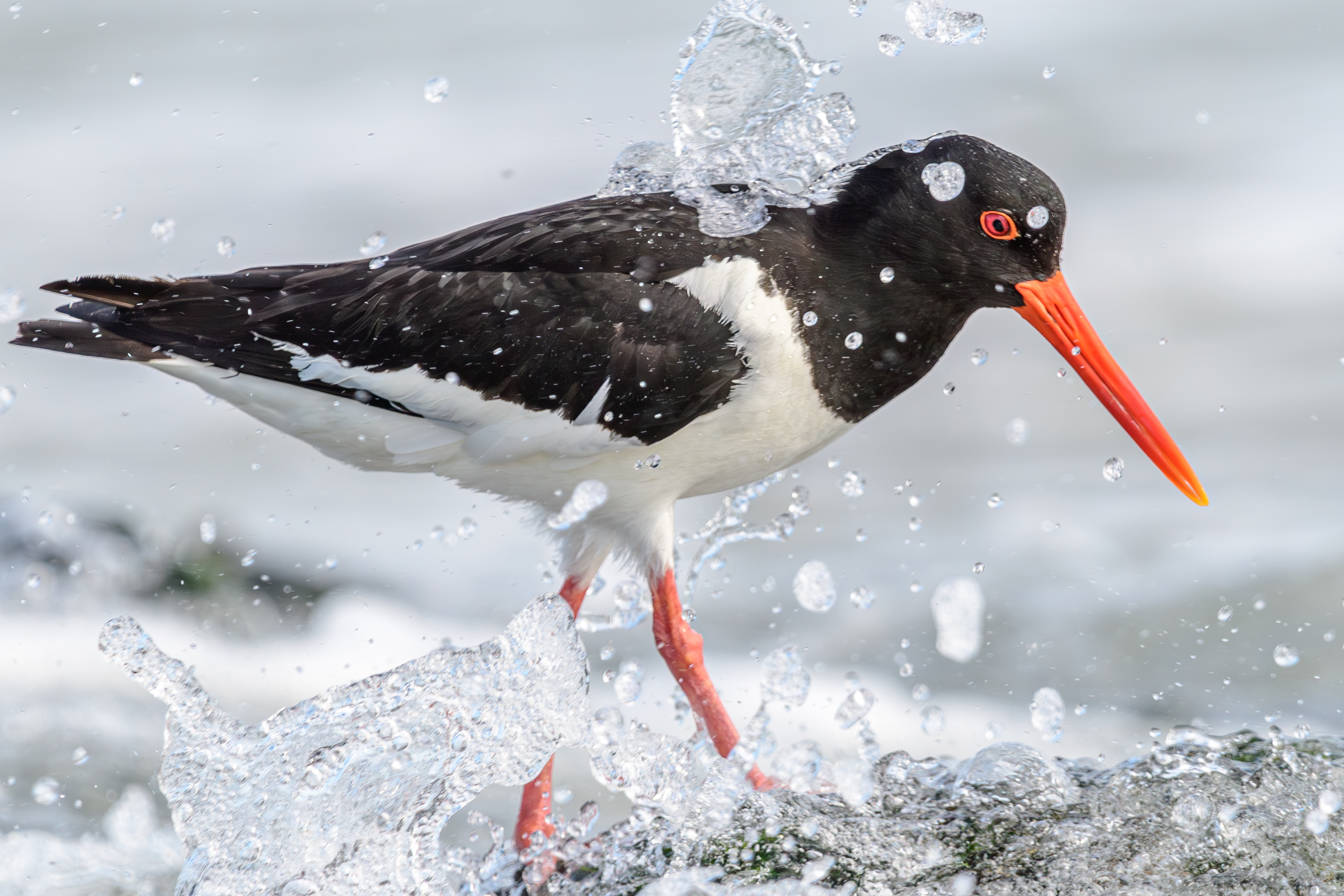
Eurasian oystercatcher

Order: Charadriiformes Family: Haematopodidae

The oystercatchers are large and noisy plover-like birds, with strong bills used for smashing or prising open molluscs.

- Eurasian oystercatcher, Haematopus ostralegus

== Plovers and lapwings ==
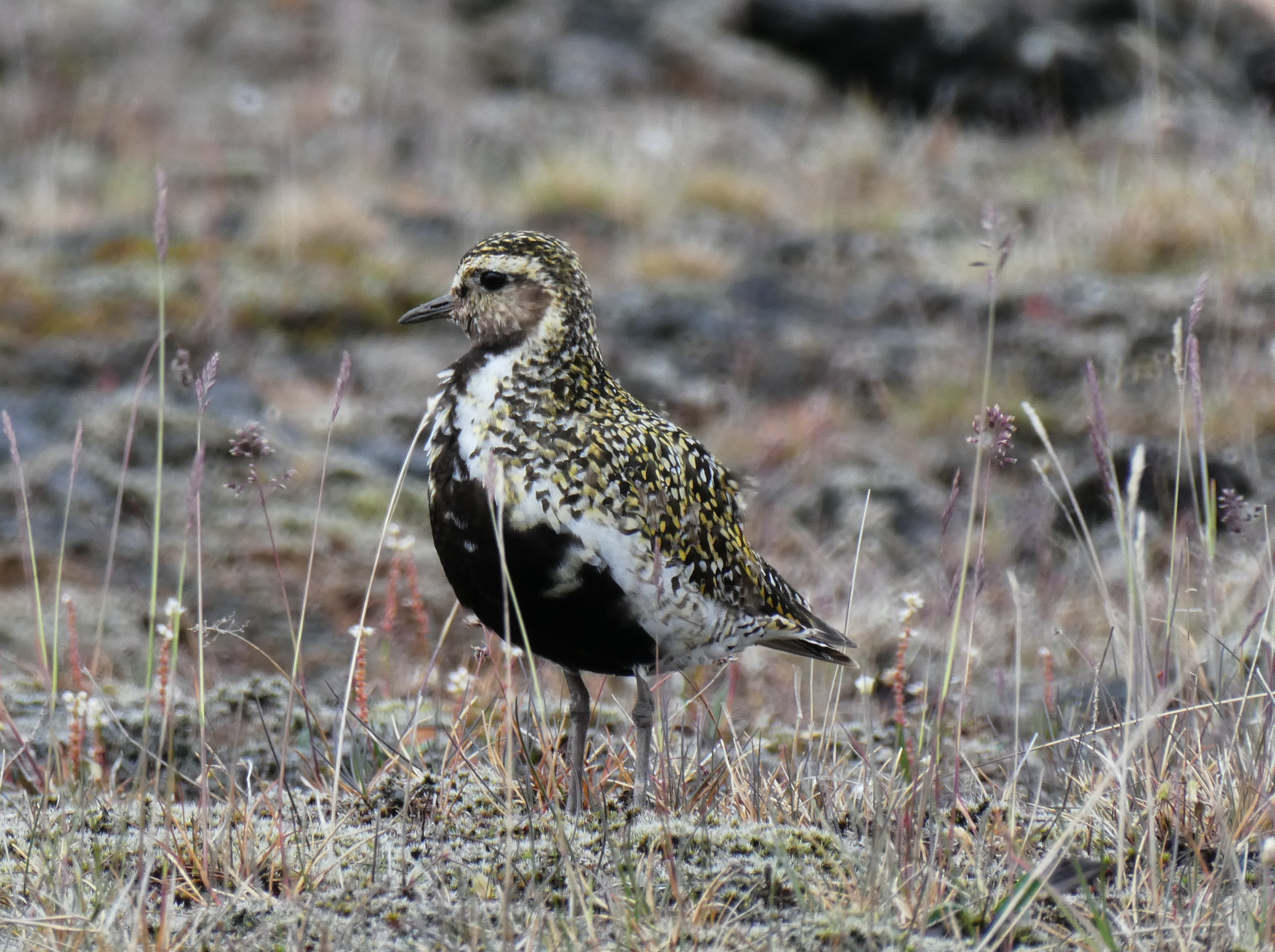
European golden plover

Order: Charadriiformes Family: Charadriidae

The family Charadriidae includes the plovers, dotterels and lapwings. They are small to medium-sized birds with compact bodies, short, thick necks and long, usually pointed, wings. They are found in open country worldwide, mostly in habitats near water.

- Grey plover, Pluvialis squatarola
- European golden plover, Pluvialis apricaria
- Northern lapwing, Vanellus vanellus
- Spur-winged lapwing, Vanellus spinosus
- Red-wattled lapwing, Vanellus indicus (A)
- Sociable lapwing, Vanellus gregarius
- White-tailed lapwing, Vanellus leucurus
- Greater sand plover, Charadrius leschenaultii (A)
- Caspian plover, Charadrius asiaticus
- Kentish plover, Charadrius alexandrinus
- Common ringed plover, Charadrius hiaticula
- Little ringed plover, Charadrius dubius
- Eurasian dotterel, Charadrius morinellus

== Sandpipers and allies ==
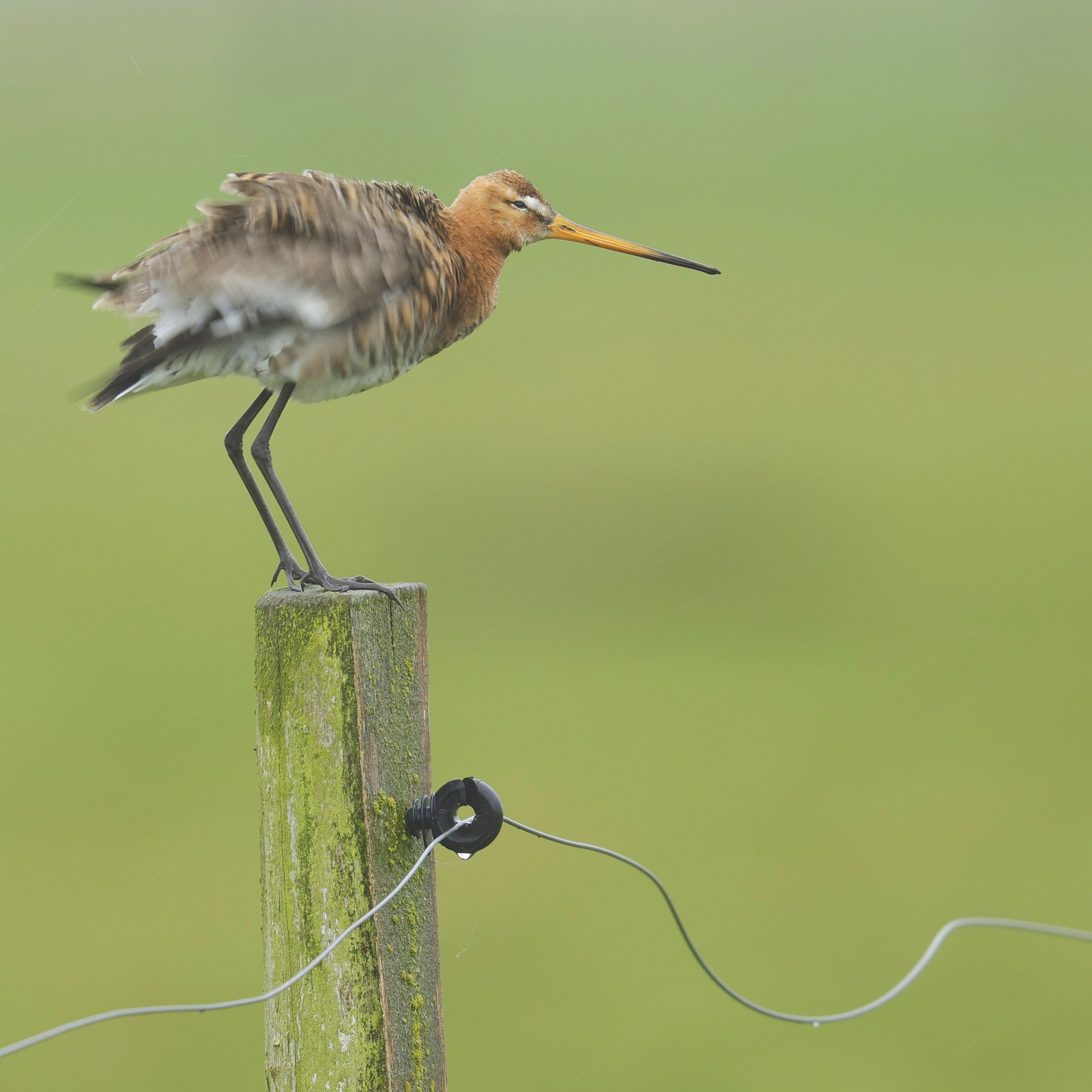
Black-tailed godwit

Order: Charadriiformes Family: Scolopacidae

Scolopacidae is a large diverse family of small to medium-sized waders including the sandpipers, curlews, godwits, shanks, tattlers, woodcocks, snipes, dowitchers and phalaropes. The majority of these species eat small invertebrates picked out of the mud or soil. Variation in length of legs and bills enables multiple species to feed in the same habitat, particularly on the coast, without direct competition for food.

- Eurasian whimbrel, Numenius phaeopus (A)
- Eurasian curlew, Numenius arquata
- Bar-tailed godwit, Limosa lapponica
- Black-tailed godwit, Limosa limosa
- Ruddy turnstone, Arenaria interpres
- Ruff, Calidris pugnax
- Broad-billed sandpiper, Calidris falcinellus
- Curlew sandpiper, Calidris ferruginea
- Temminck's stint, Calidris temminckii
- Sanderling, Calidris alba
- Dunlin, Calidris alpina
- Little stint, Calidris minuta
- Jack snipe, Lymnocryptes minimus
- Eurasian woodcock, Scolopax rusticola
- Great snipe, Gallinago media
- Common snipe, Gallinago gallinago
- Terek sandpiper, Xenus cinereus
- Red-necked phalarope, Phalaropus lobatus
- Common sandpiper, Actitis hypoleucos
- Green sandpiper, Tringa ochropus
- Spotted redshank, Tringa erythropus
- Common greenshank, Tringa nebularia
- Marsh sandpiper, Tringa stagnatilis
- Wood sandpiper, Tringa glareola
- Common redshank, Tringa totanus

== Pratincoles and coursers ==
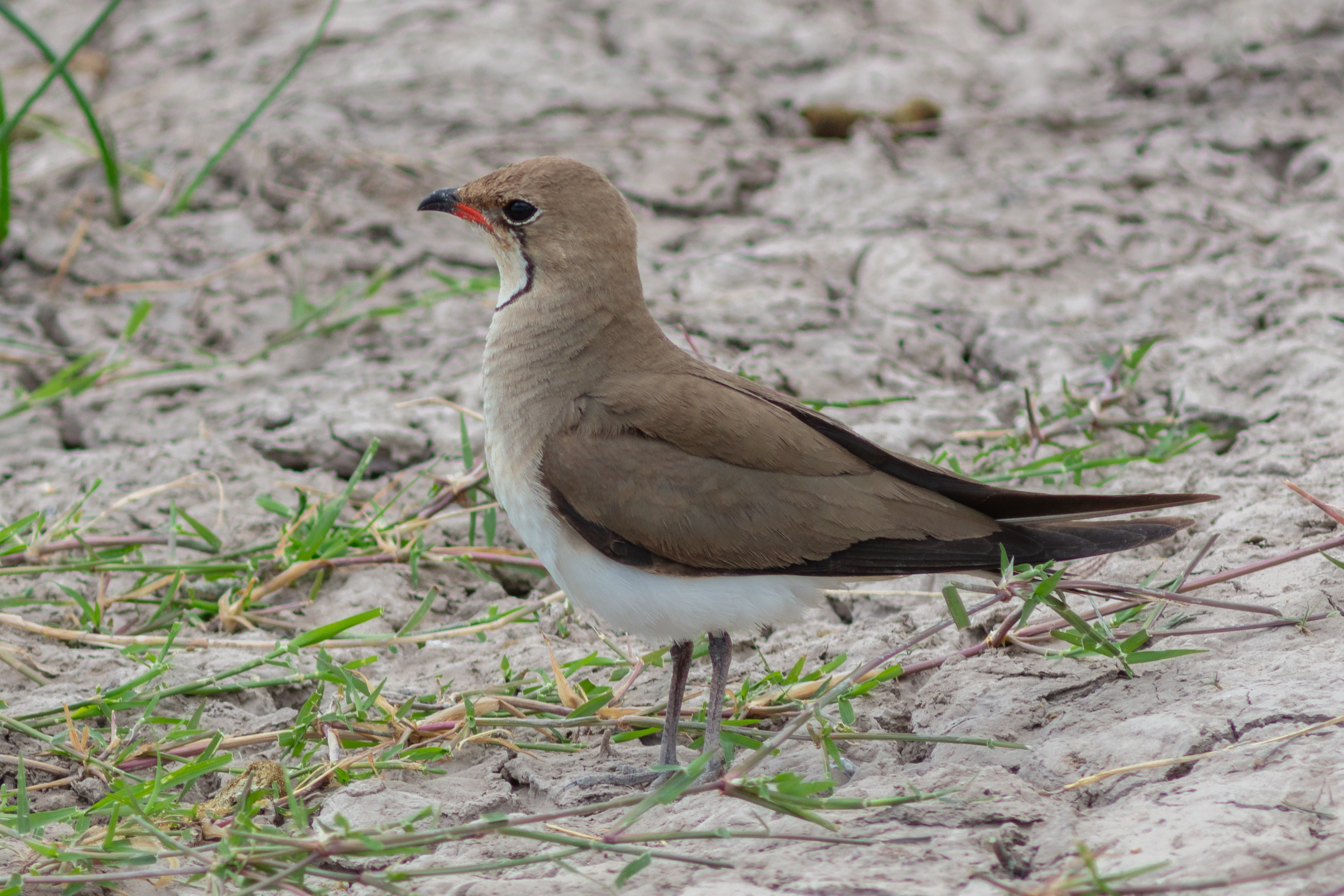
Collared pratincole

Order: Charadriiformes Family: Glareolidae

Glareolidae is a family of wading birds comprising the pratincoles, which have short legs, long pointed wings and long forked tails, and the coursers, which have long legs, short wings and long, pointed bills which curve downwards.

- Collared pratincole, Glareola pratincola
- Black-winged pratincole, Glareola nordmanni

== Skuas and jaegers ==
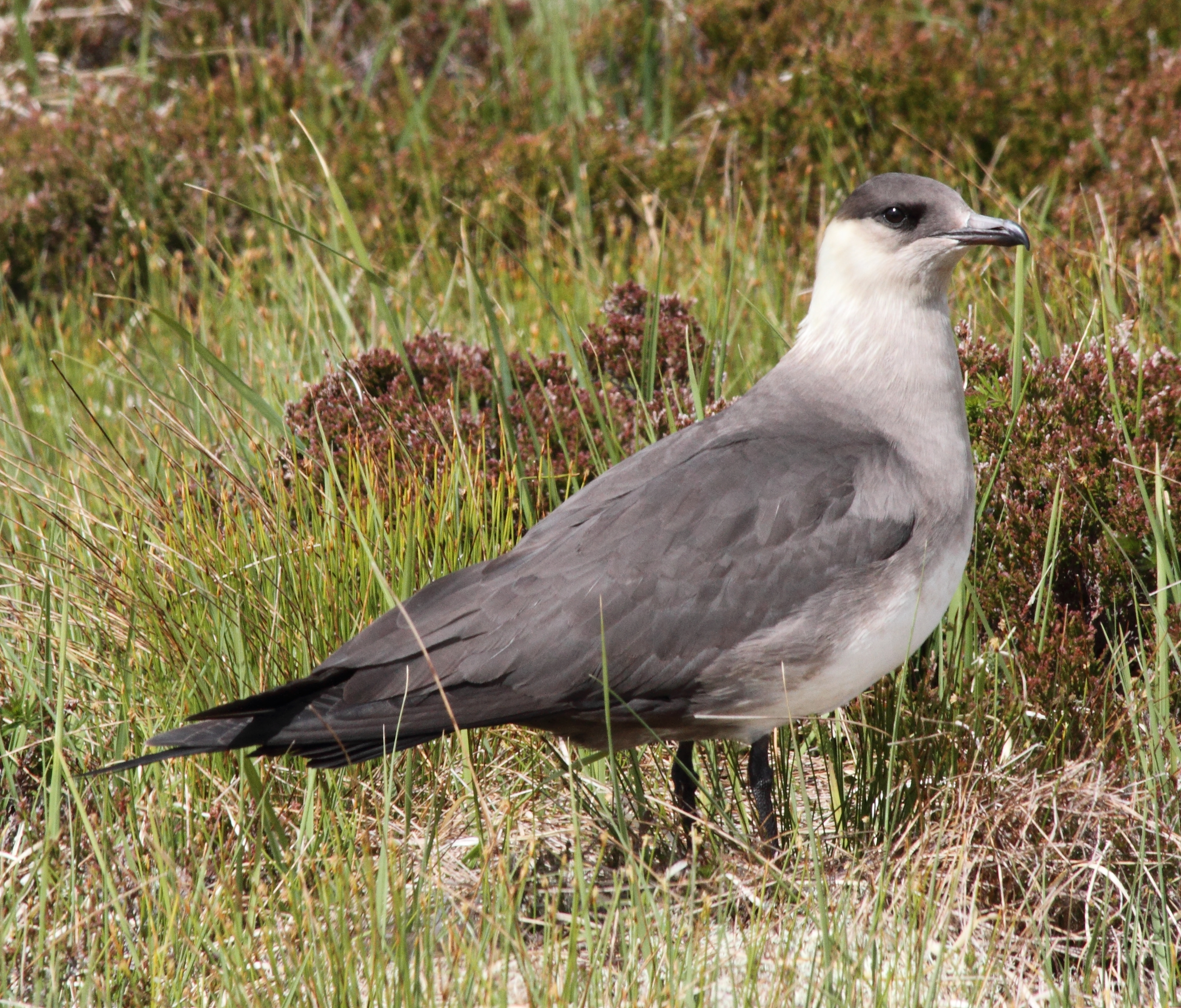
Arctic skua

Order: Charadriiformes Family: Stercorariidae

The family Stercorariidae are, in general, medium to large birds, typically with grey or brown plumage, often with white markings on the wings. They nest on the ground in temperate and arctic regions and are long-distance migrants.

- Pomarine skua, Stercorarius pomarinus
- Arctic skua, Stercorarius parasiticus
- Long-tailed skua, Stercorarius longicaudus (A)

== Gulls, terns, and skimmers ==
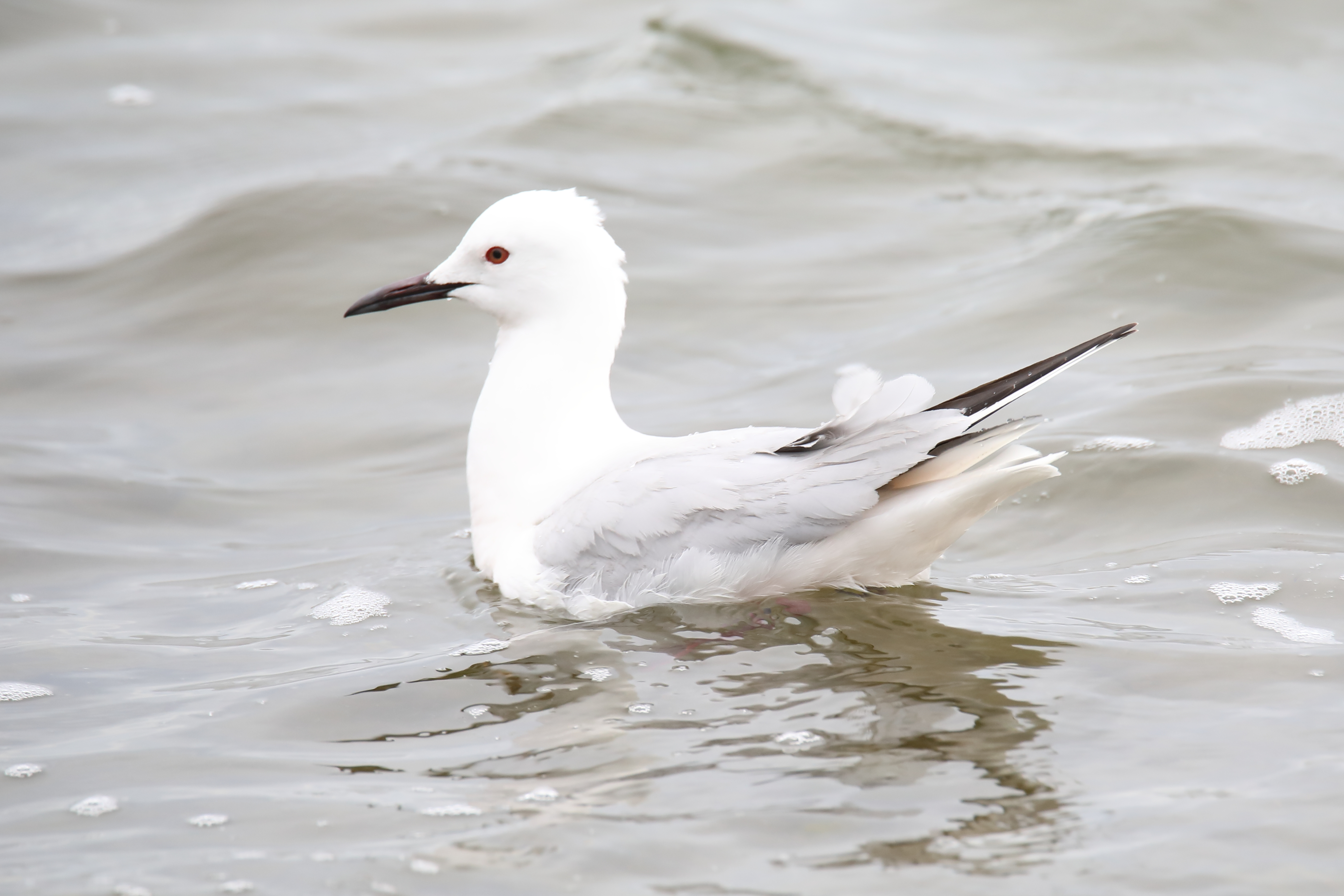
Slender-billed gull

Order: Charadriiformes Family: Laridae

Laridae is a family of medium to large seabirds, the gulls, terns, and skimmers. Gulls are typically grey or white, often with black markings on the head or wings. They have stout, longish bills and webbed feet. Terns are a group of generally medium to large seabirds typically with grey or white plumage, often with black markings on the head. Most terns hunt fish by diving but some pick insects off the surface of fresh water. Gulls and terns are generally long-lived birds, with several species known to live in excess of 30 years.

- Slender-billed gull, Chroicocephalus genei
- Black-headed gull, Chroicocephalus ridibundus
- Little gull, Hydrocoloeus minutus
- Mediterranean gull, Ichthyaetus melanocephalus
- Pallas's gull, Ichthyaetus ichthyaetus
- Common gull, Larus canus
- Yellow-legged gull, Larus michahellis (A)
- Caspian gull, Larus cachinnans
- Armenian gull, Larus armenicus
- Lesser black-backed gull, Larus fuscus
- Little tern, Sternula albifrons
- Gull-billed tern, Gelochelidon nilotica
- Caspian tern, Hydroprogne caspia
- Black tern, Chlidonias niger
- White-winged tern, Chlidonias leucopterus
- Whiskered tern, Chlidonias hybrida
- Common tern, Sterna hirundo
- Arctic tern, Sterna paradisaea (A)
- Sandwich tern, Thalasseus sandvicensis (A)

== Divers ==
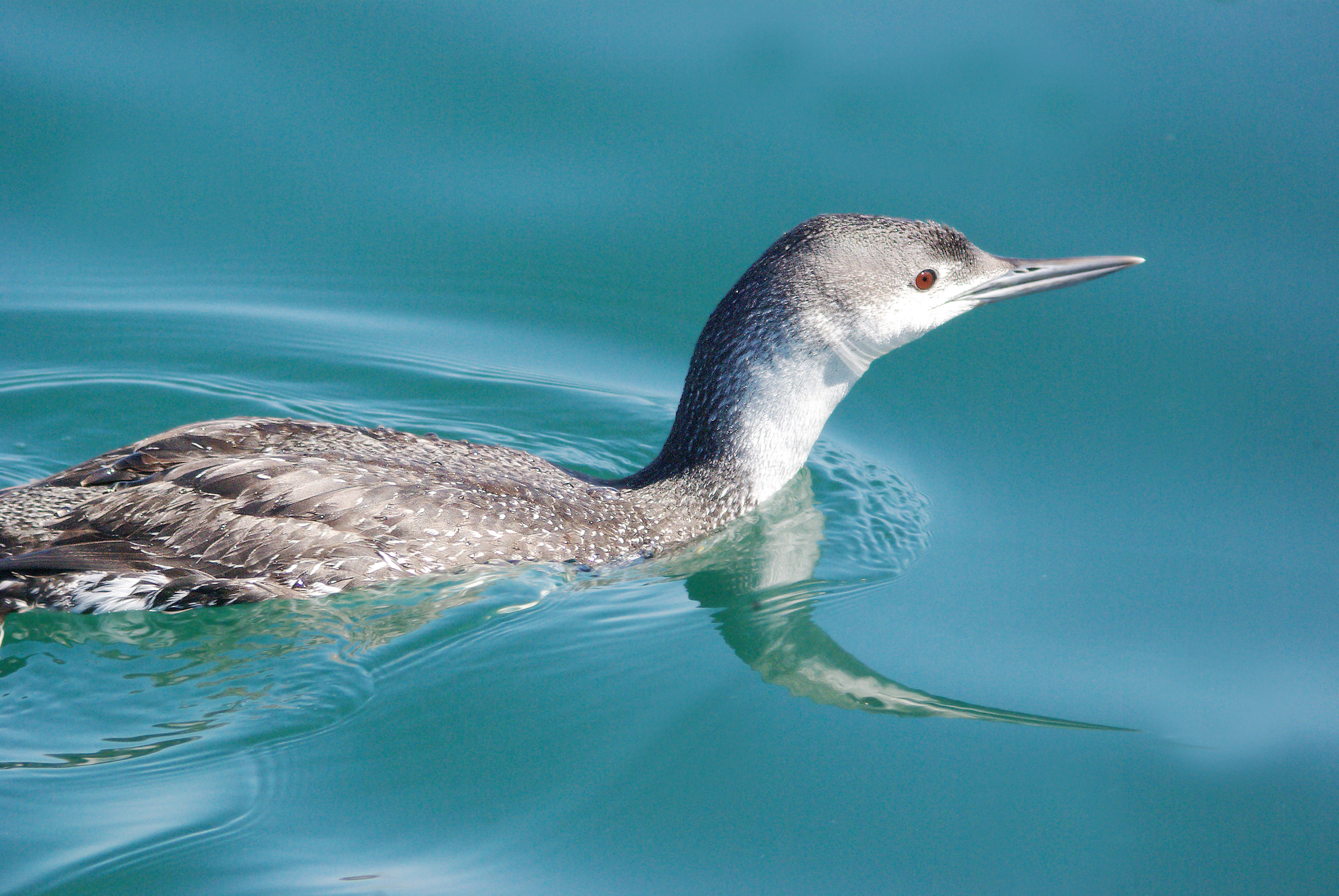
Red-throated loon

Order: Gaviiformes Family: Gaviidae

Divers, known as loons in North America, are a group of aquatic birds found in northern parts of Europe, Asia, and North America. They are the size of a large duck or small goose, which they somewhat resemble when swimming, but to which they are completely unrelated.

- Red-throated diver, Gavia stellata
- Black-throated diver, Gavia arctica

== Storks ==
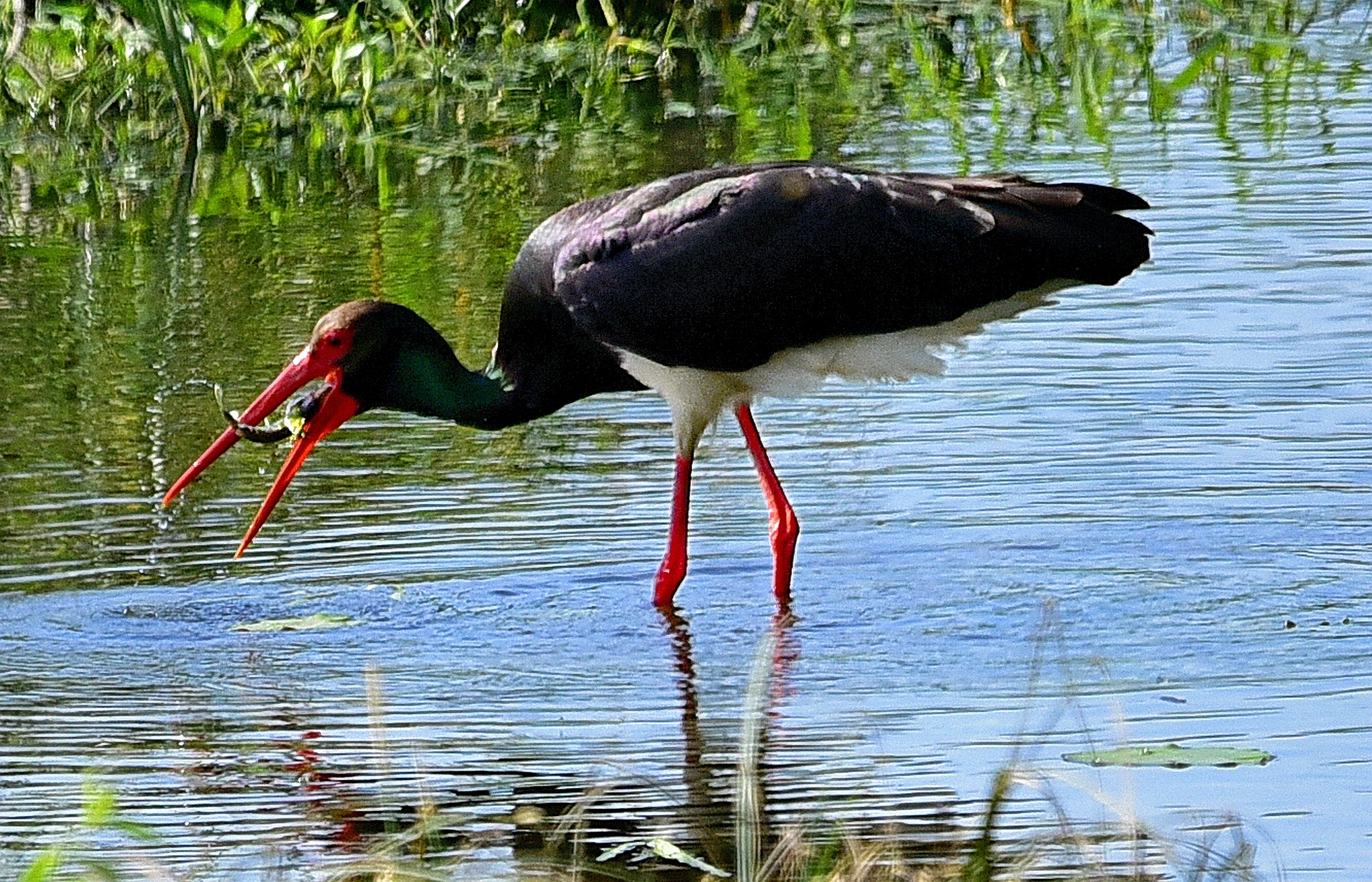
Black stork

Order: Ciconiiformes Family: Ciconiidae

Storks are large, long-legged, long-necked, wetland birds with long, stout bills. Storks are mute, but bill-clattering is an important mode of communication at the nest. Their nests can be large and may be reused for many years. Many species are migratory.

- Black stork, Ciconia nigra
- White stork, Ciconia ciconia

== Cormorants and shags ==
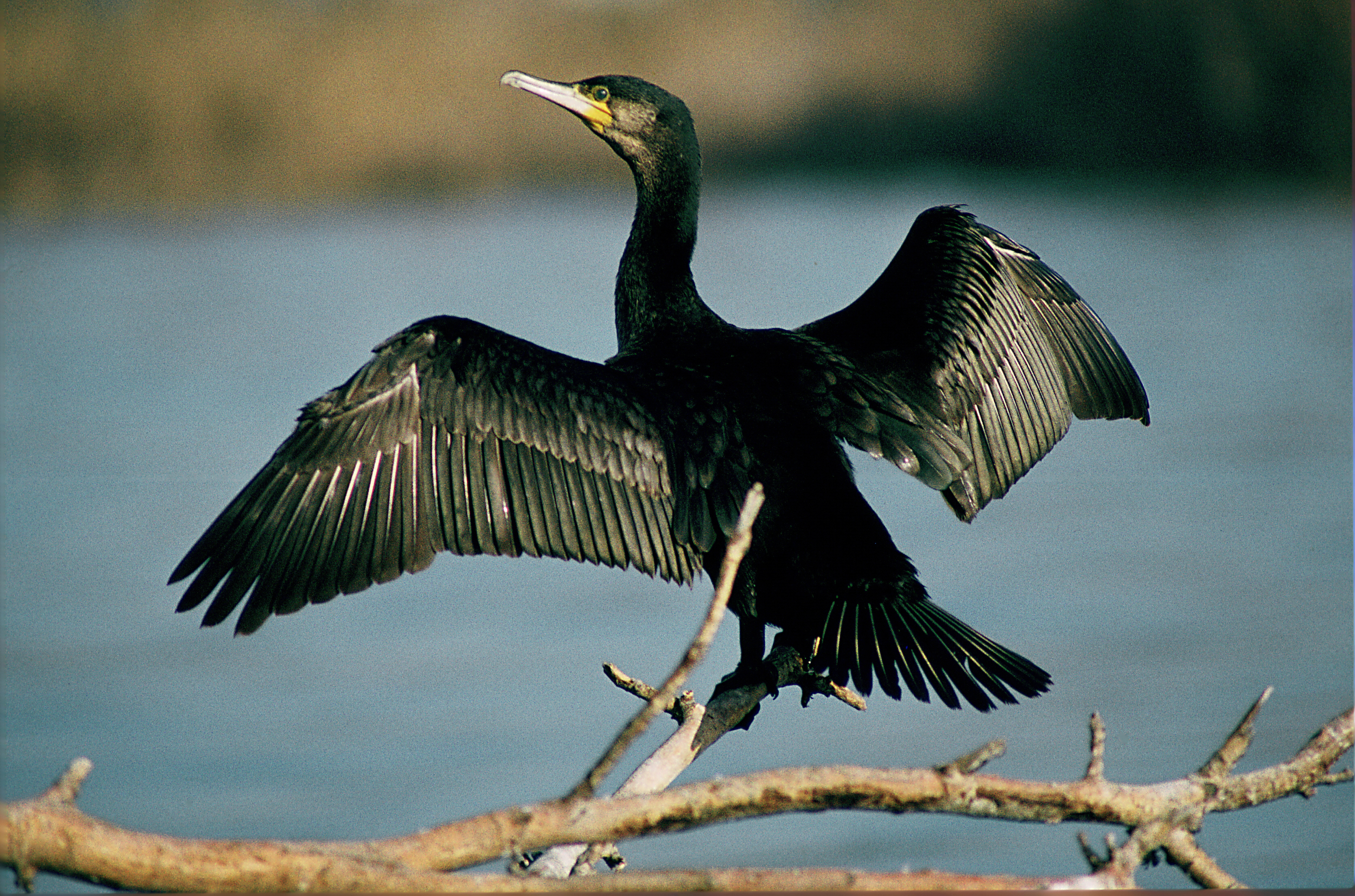
Great cormorant

Order: Suliformes Family: Phalacrocoracidae

Phalacrocoracidae is a family of medium to large coastal, fish-eating seabirds that includes cormorants and shags. Plumage colour varies, with the majority having mainly dark plumage, some species being black-and-white, and many having colourful eyes and throat pouches.

- Pygmy cormorant, Microcarbo pygmeus
- Great cormorant, Phalacrocorax carbo

== Pelicans ==
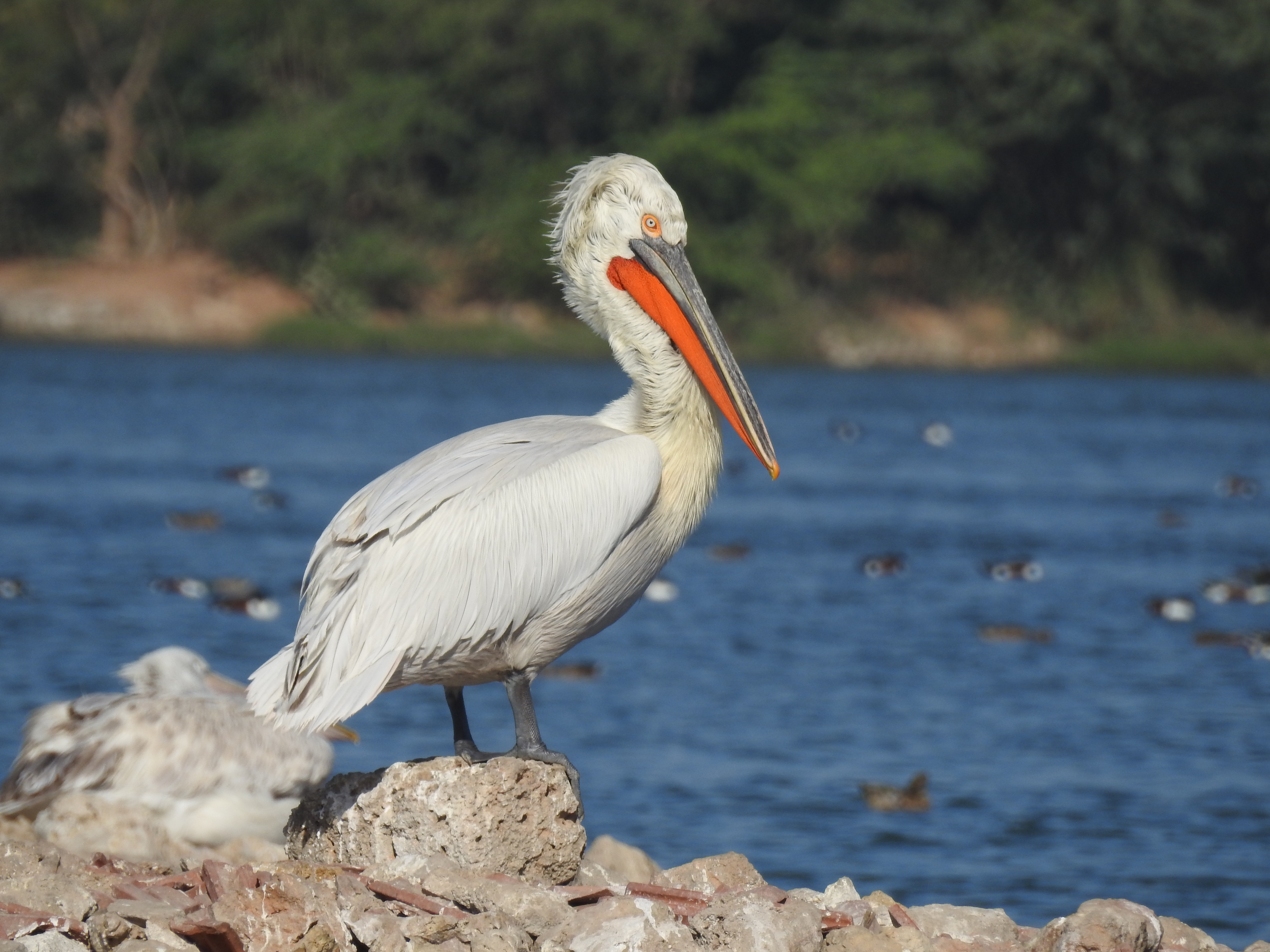
Dalmatian pelican

Order: Pelecaniformes Family: Pelecanidae

Pelicans are large water birds with a distinctive pouch under their beak. As with other members of the order Pelecaniformes, they have webbed feet with four toes.

- Great white pelican, Pelecanus onocrotalus
- Dalmatian pelican, Pelecanus crispus

== Herons, egrets, and bitterns ==
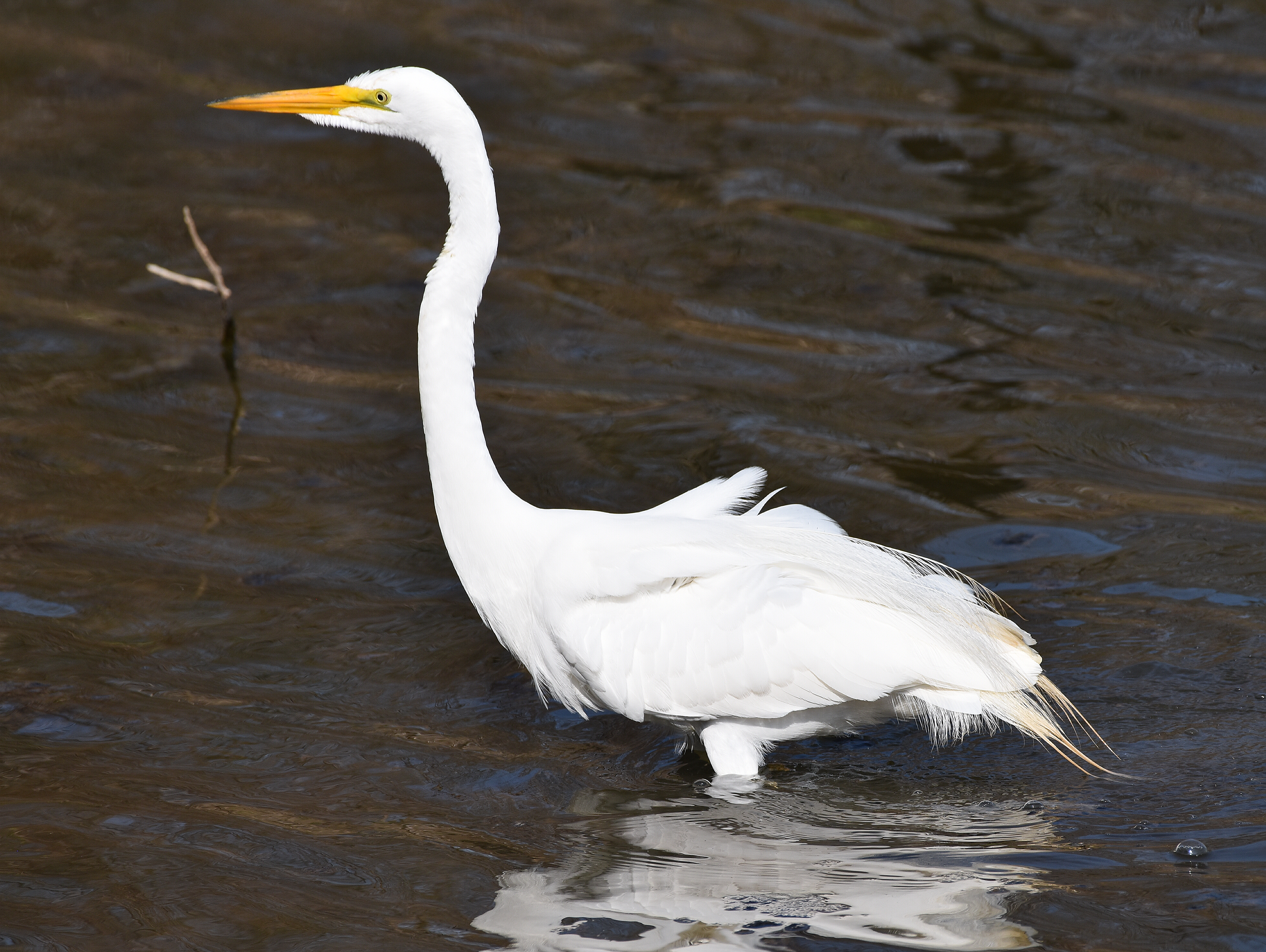
Great egret

Order: Pelecaniformes Family: Ardeidae

The family Ardeidae contains the bitterns, herons and egrets. Herons and egrets are medium to large wading birds with long necks and legs. Bitterns tend to be shorter necked and more wary. Members of Ardeidae fly with their necks retracted, unlike other long-necked birds such as storks, ibises and spoonbills.

- Great bittern, Botaurus stellaris
- Little bittern, Ixobrychus minutus
- Grey heron, Ardea cinerea
- Purple heron, Ardea purpurea
- Great egret, Ardea alba
- Little egret, Egretta garzetta
- Cattle egret, Bubulcus ibis
- Squacco heron, Ardeola ralloides
- Black-crowned night heron, Nycticorax nycticorax

== Ibises and spoonbills ==
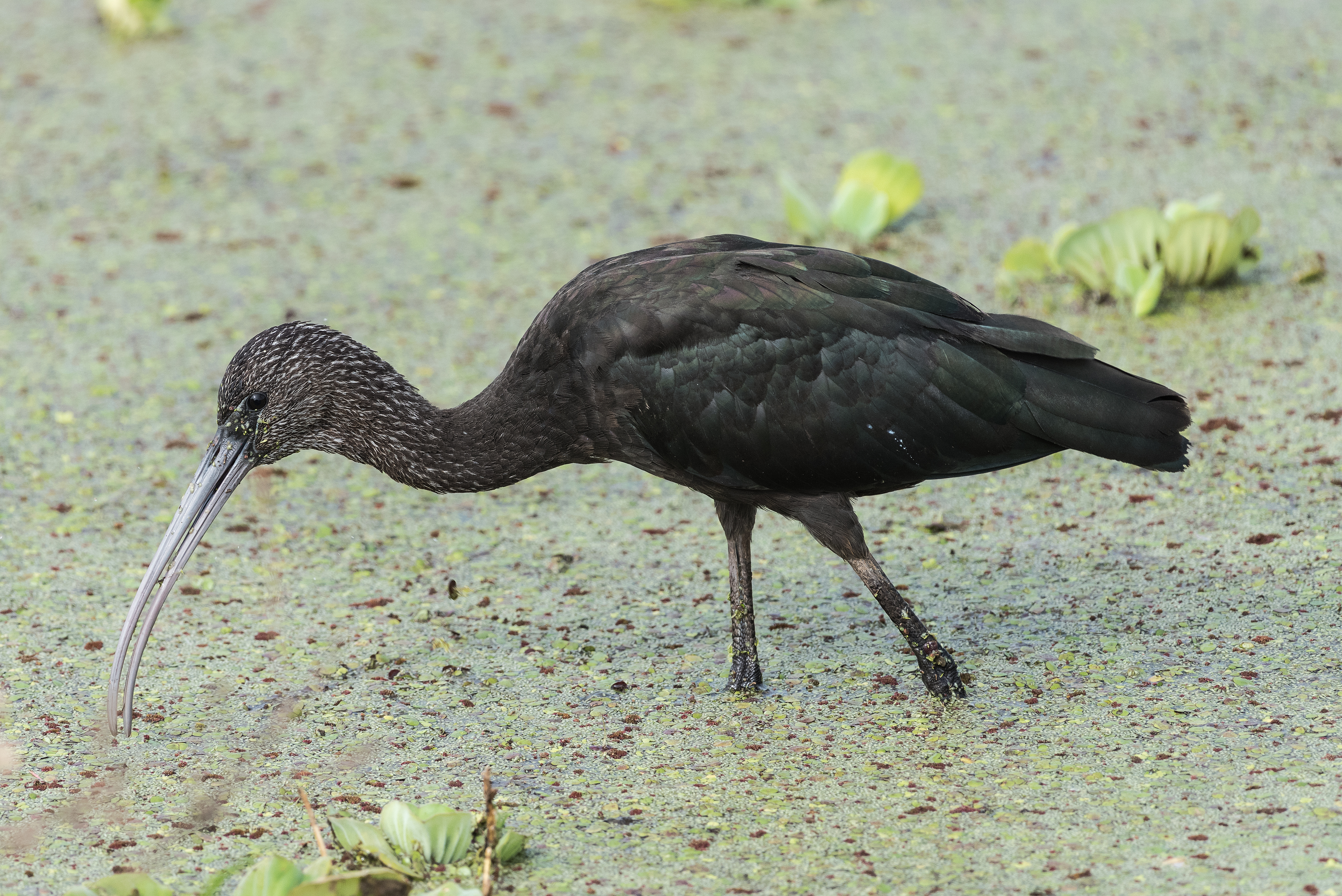
Glossy ibis

Order: Pelecaniformes Family: Threskiornithidae

Threskiornithidae is a family of large terrestrial and wading birds which includes the ibises and spoonbills. They have long, broad wings with 11 primary and about 20 secondary feathers. They are strong fliers and despite their size and weight, very capable soarers.

- Glossy ibis, Plegadis falcinellus
- Eurasian spoonbill, Platalea leucorodia

== Osprey ==
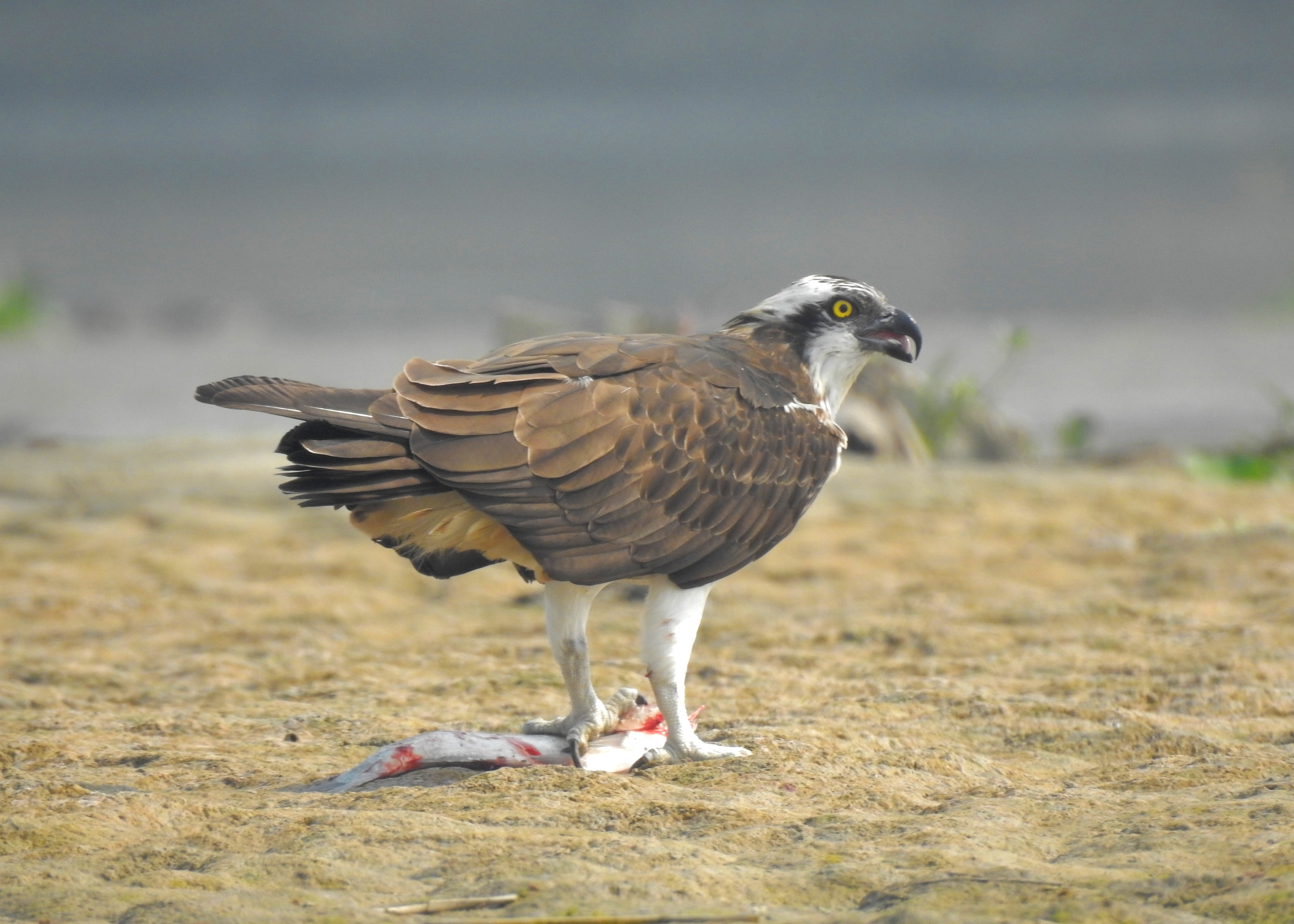
Osprey

Order: Accipitriformes Family: Pandionidae

The family Pandionidae contains only one species, the osprey. The osprey is a medium-large raptor which is a specialist fish-eater with a worldwide distribution.

- Osprey, Pandion haliaetus

== Hawks, eagles, and kites ==
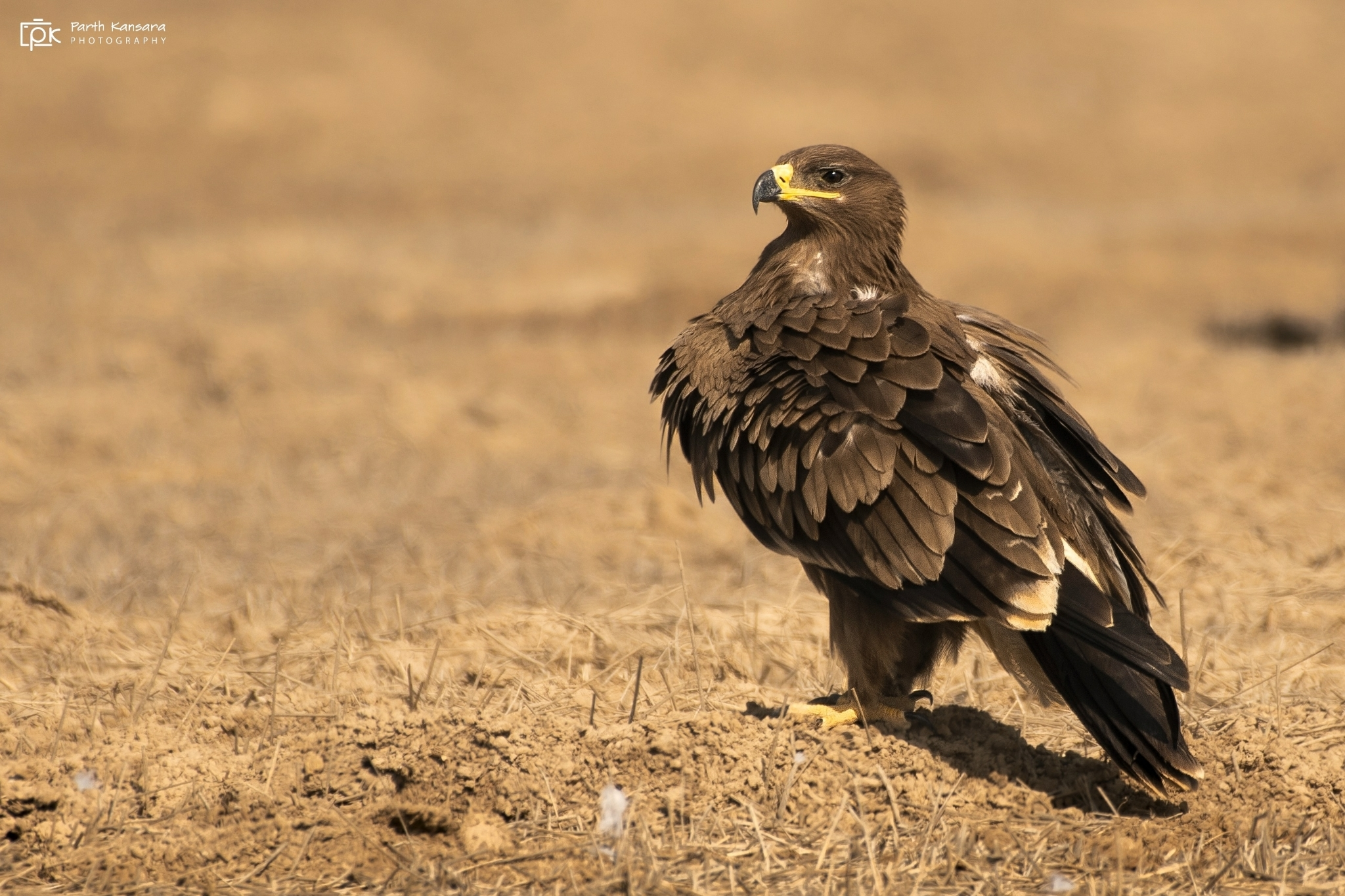
Steppe eagle

Order: Accipitriformes Family: Accipitridae

Accipitridae is a family of birds of prey, which includes hawks, eagles, kites, harriers and Old World vultures. These birds have powerful hooked beaks for tearing flesh from their prey, strong legs, powerful talons and keen eyesight.

- Black-winged kite, Elanus caeruleus (A)
- Bearded vulture, Gypaetus barbatus
- Egyptian vulture, Neophron percnopterus
- European honey-buzzard, Pernis apivorus
- Oriental honey-buzzard, Pernis ptilorhynchus (A)
- Eurasian black vulture, Aegypius monachus
- Himalayan vulture, Gyps himalayensis (A)
- Griffon vulture, Gyps fulvus
- Short-toed snake eagle, Circaetus gallicus
- Lesser spotted eagle, Clanga pomarina
- Greater spotted eagle, Clanga clanga
- Booted eagle, Hieraaetus pennatus
- Steppe eagle, Aquila nipalensis
- Eastern imperial eagle, Aquila heliaca
- Golden eagle, Aquila chrysaetos
- Bonelli's eagle, Aquila fasciata (A)
- Western marsh harrier, Circus aeruginosus
- Hen harrier, Circus cyaneus
- Pallid harrier, Circus macrourus
- Montagu's harrier, Circus pygargus
- Shikra, Tachyspiza badius
- Levant sparrowhawk, Tachyspiza brevipes
- Eurasian sparrowhawk, Accipiter nisus
- Northern goshawk, Astur gentilis
- Red kite, Milvus milvus
- Black kite, Milvus migrans
- White-tailed eagle, Haliaeetus albicilla
- Pallas's fish eagle, Haliaeetus leucoryphus (A)
- Rough-legged buzzard, Buteo lagopus
- Common buzzard, Buteo buteo
- Long-legged buzzard, Buteo rufinus

== Barn owls ==
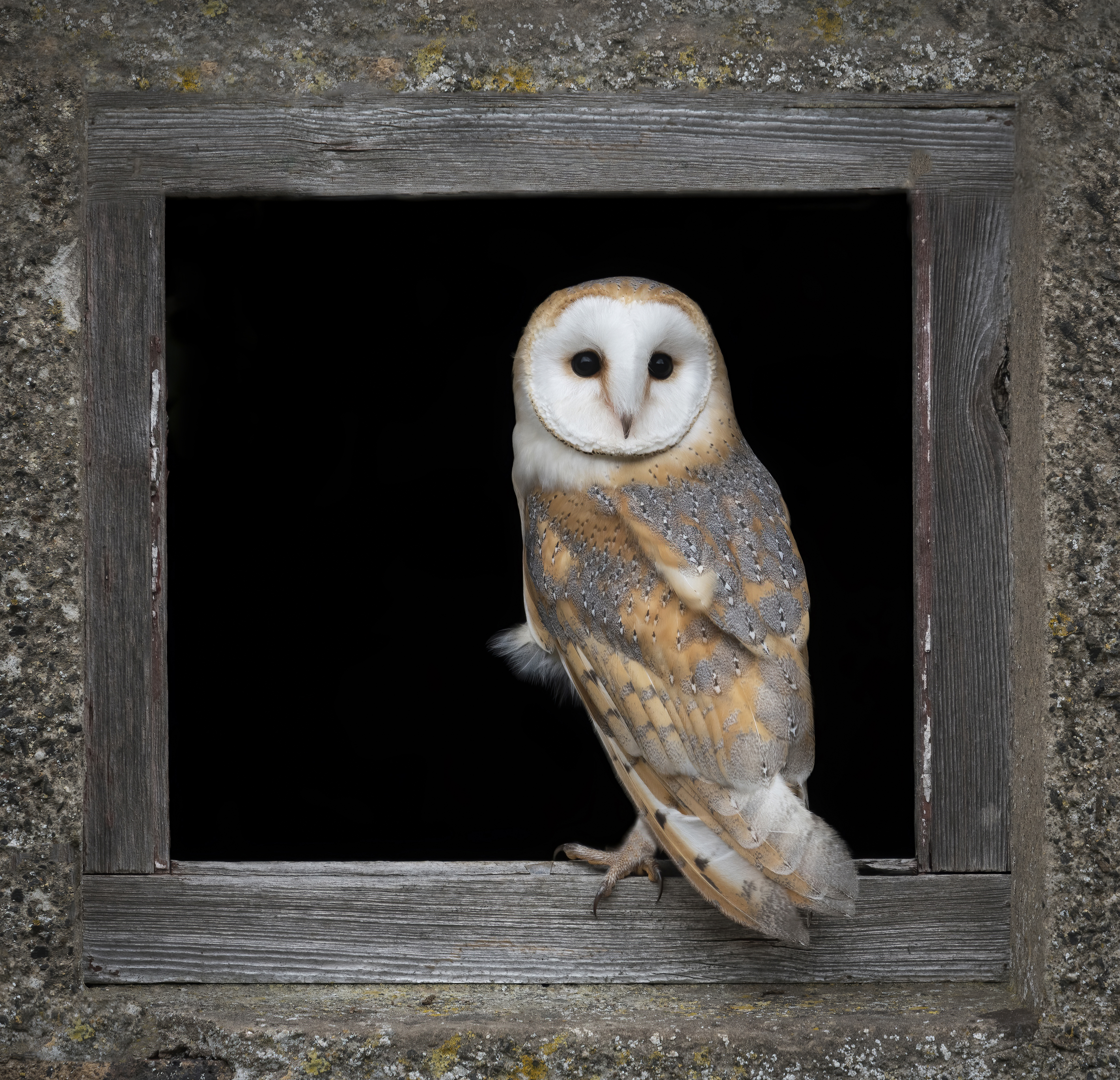
Western barn owl

Order: Strigiformes Family: Tytonidae

Barn owls are medium sized owls with large heads and characteristic heart-shaped faces. They have long strong legs with powerful talons.

- Western barn owl, Tyto alba

== Owls ==
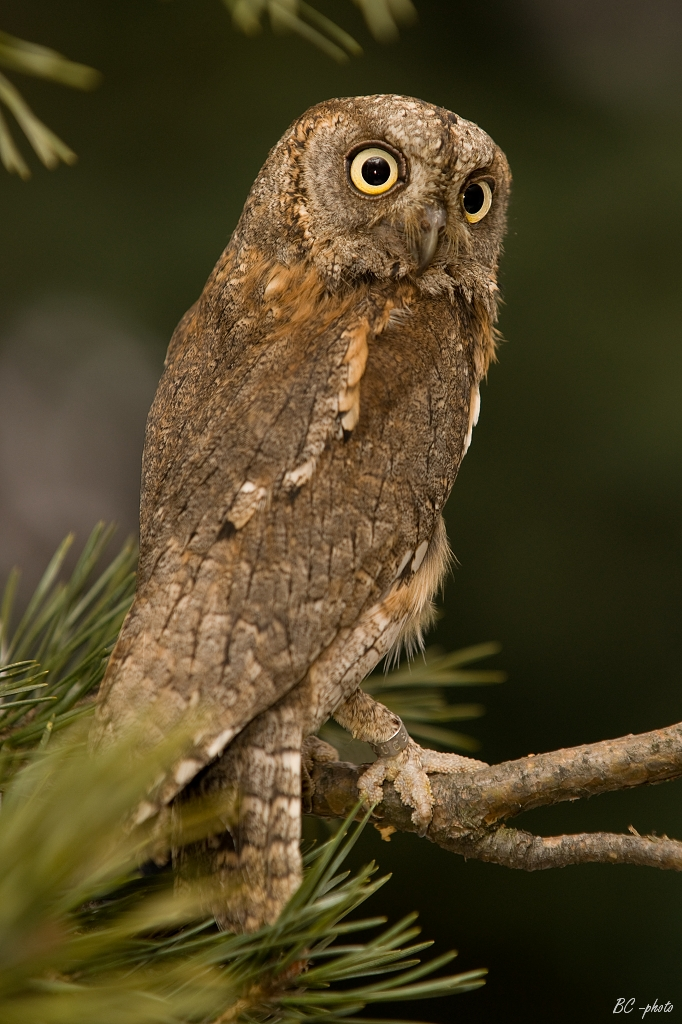
Eurasian scops owl

Order: Strigiformes Family: Strigidae

The typical owls are small to large solitary nocturnal birds of prey. They have large forward-facing eyes and ears, a hawk-like beak and a conspicuous circle of feathers around each eye called a facial disk.

- Eurasian scops owl, Otus scops
- Eurasian eagle-owl, Bubo bubo
- Little owl, Athene noctua
- Tawny owl, Strix aluco
- Long-eared owl, Asio otus
- Short-eared owl, Asio flammeus
- Tengmalm's owl, Aegolius funereus

== Hoopoes ==
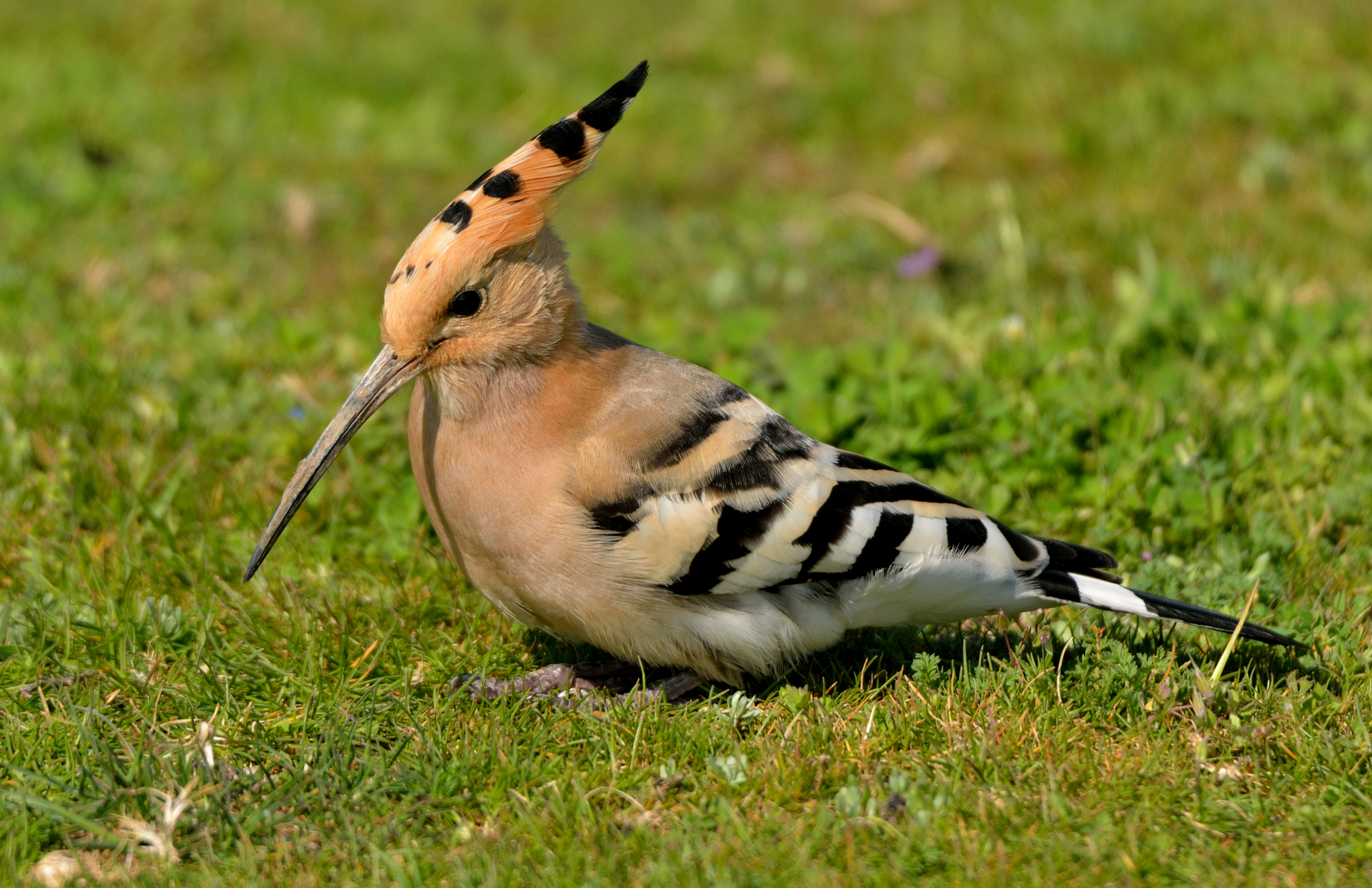
Eurasian hoopoe

Order: Bucerotiformes Family: Upupidae

Hoopoes have black, white and orangey-pink colouring with a large erectile crest on their head.

- Eurasian hoopoe, Upupa epops

== Kingfishers ==
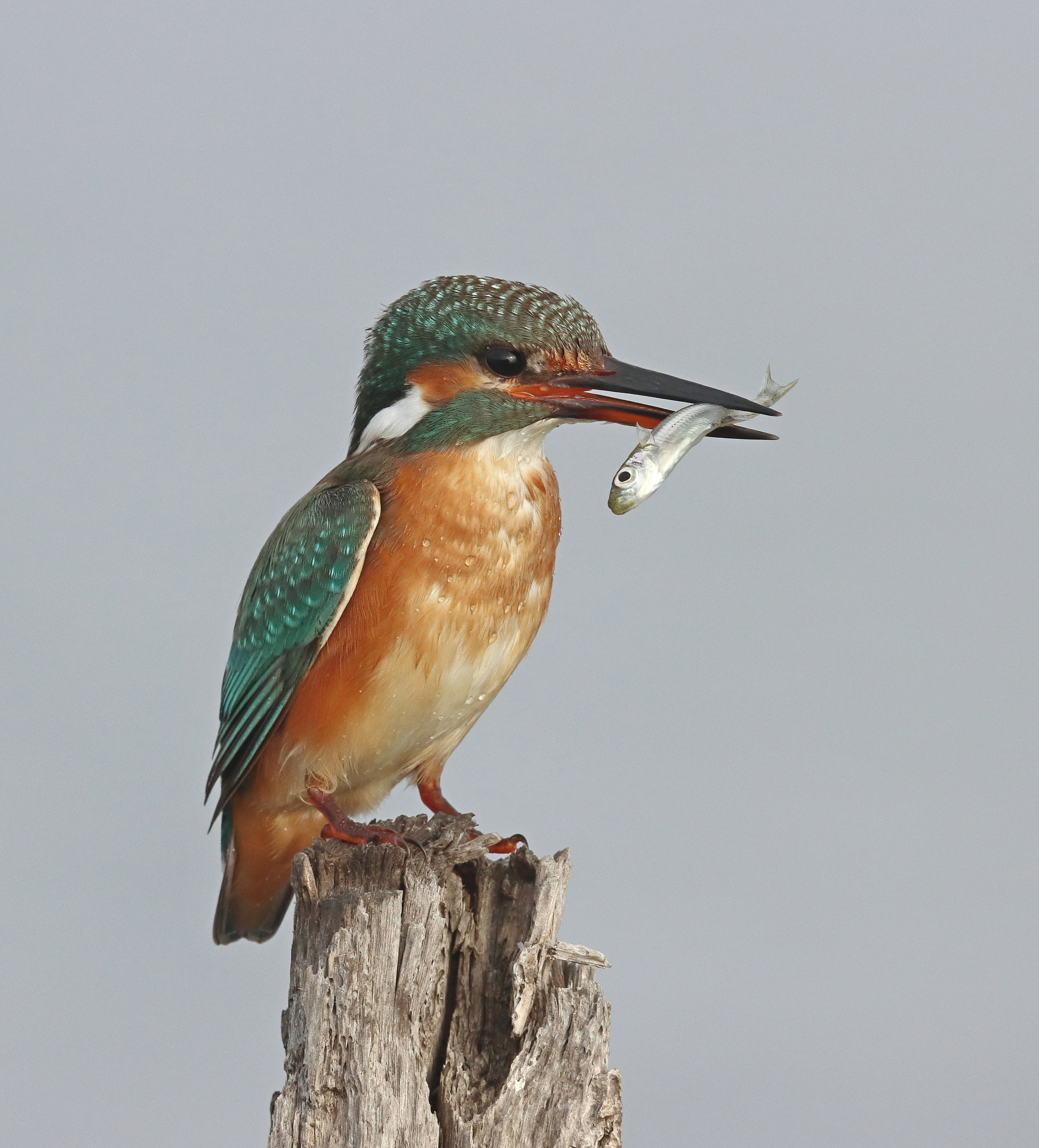
Common kingfisher

Order: Coraciiformes Family: Alcedinidae

Kingfishers are medium-small sized birds with large heads, long, pointed bills, short legs and stubby tails.

- Common kingfisher, Alcedo atthis
- Pied kingfisher, Ceryle rudis (A)

== Bee-eaters ==
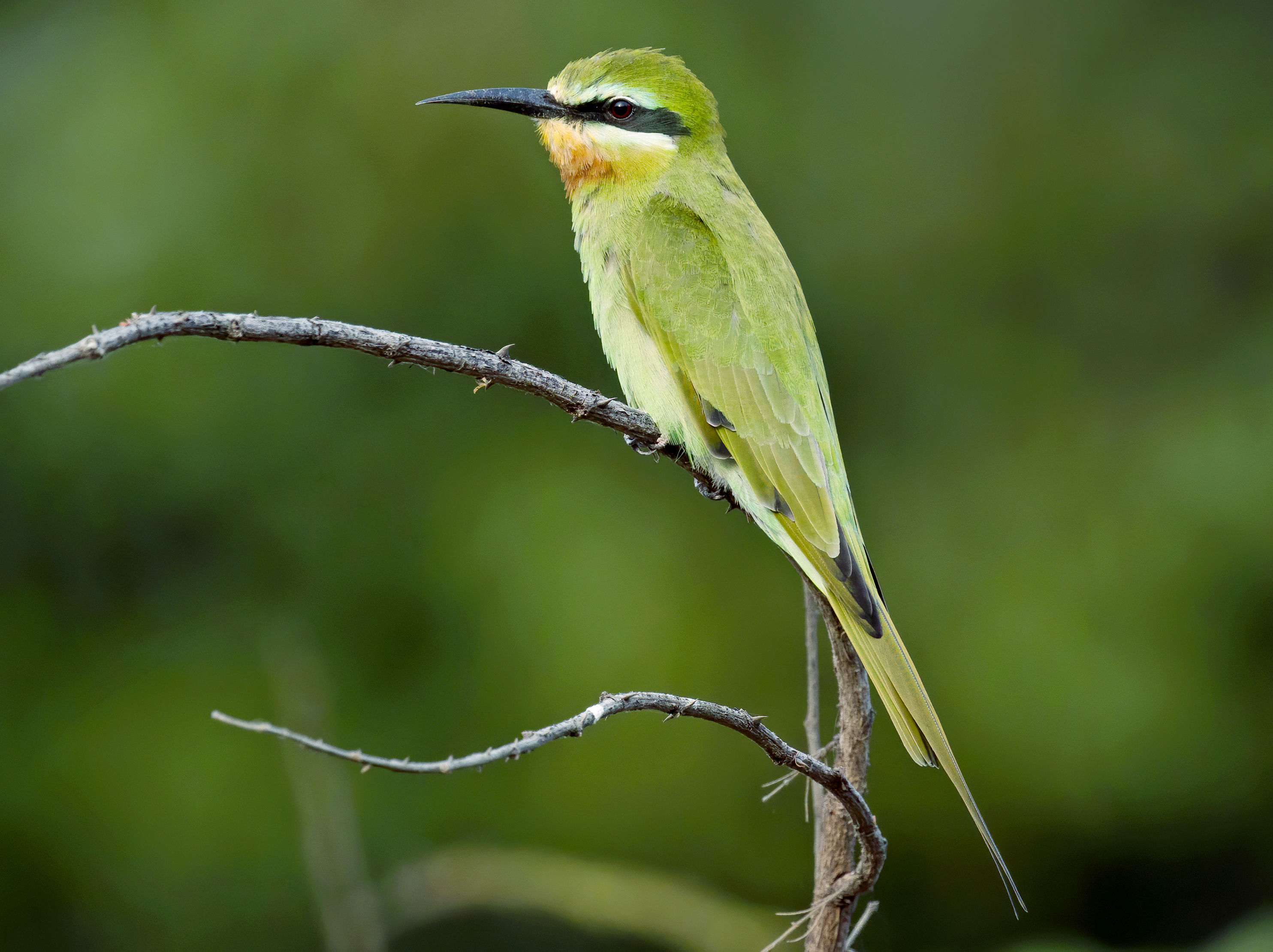
Blue-cheeked bee-eater

Order: Coraciiformes Family: Meropidae

The bee-eaters are a group of near passerine birds in the family Meropidae. Most species are found in Africa but others occur in southern Europe, Madagascar, Australia and New Guinea. They are characterised by richly coloured plumage, slender bodies and usually elongated central tail feathers. All are colourful and have long downturned bills and pointed wings, which give them a swallow-like appearance when seen from afar.

- Blue-cheeked bee-eater, Merops persicus
- European bee-eater, Merops apiaster

== Rollers ==
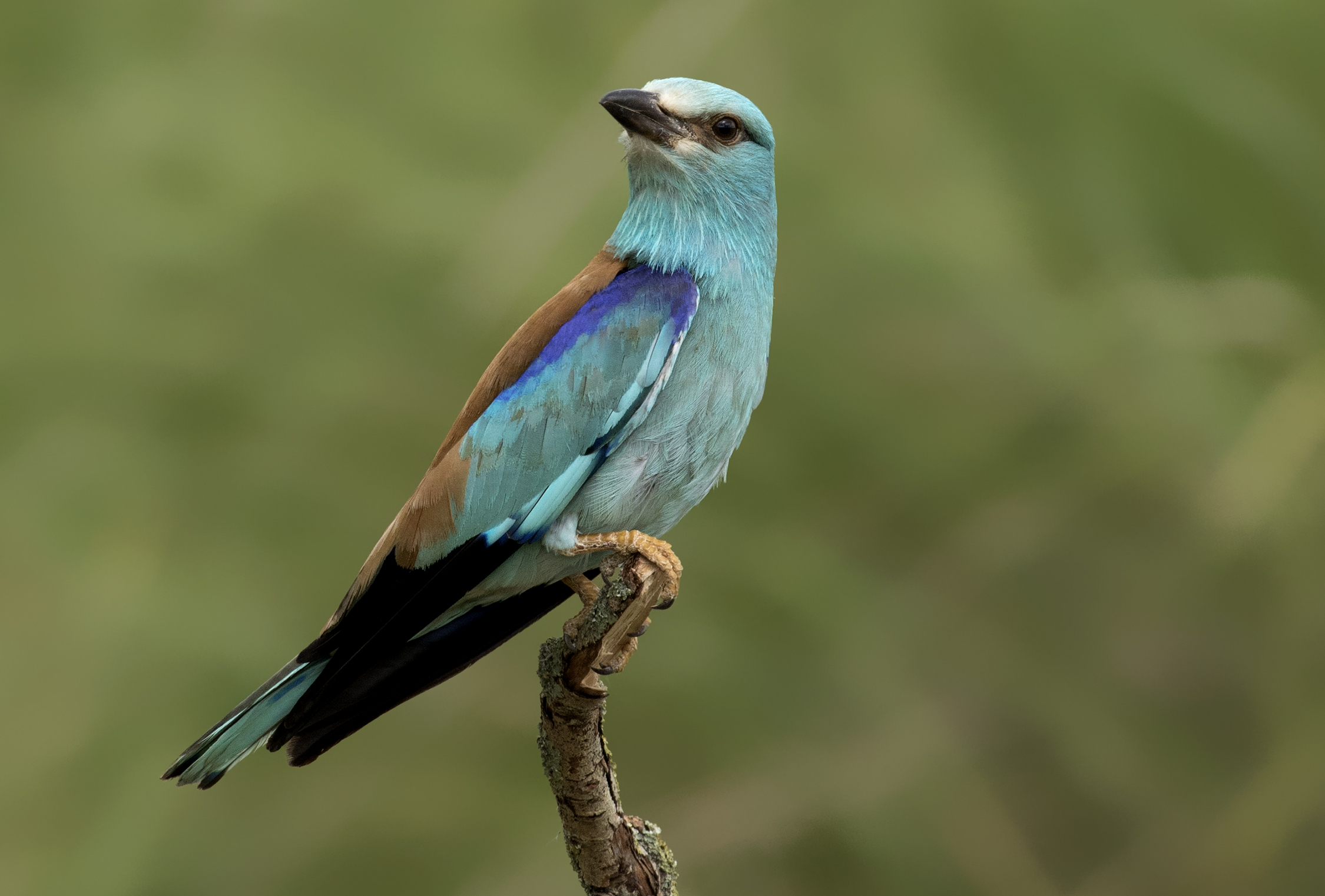
European roller

Order: Coraciiformes Family: Coraciidae

Rollers resemble crows in size and build, but are more closely related to the kingfishers and bee-eaters. They share the colourful appearance of those groups with blues and browns predominating. The two inner front toes are connected, but the outer toe is not.

- European roller, Coracias garrulus

== Woodpeckers ==
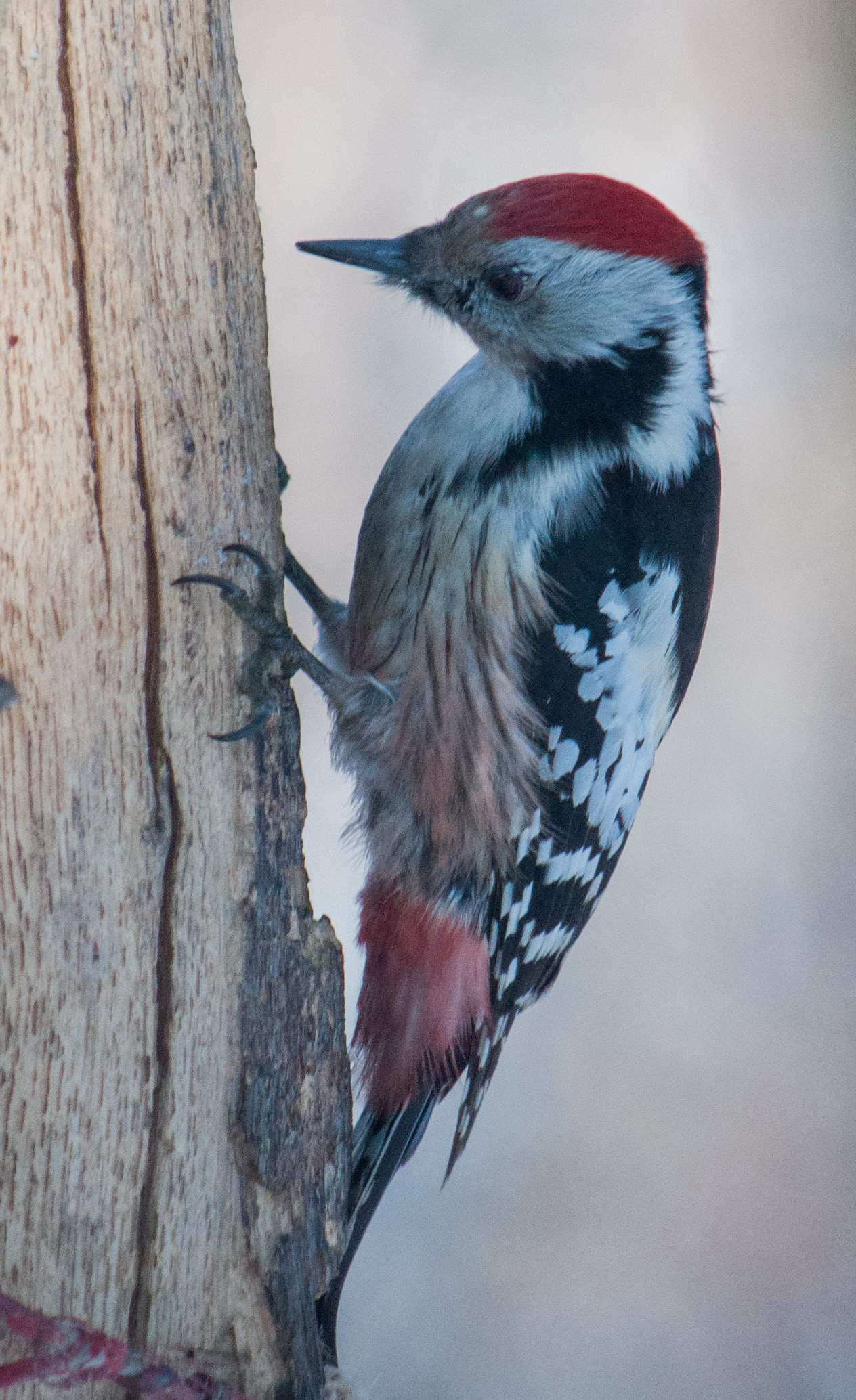
Middle spotted woodpecker

Order: Piciformes Family: Picidae

Woodpeckers are small to medium-sized birds with chisel-like beaks, short legs, stiff tails and long tongues used for capturing insects. Some species have feet with two toes pointing forward and two backward, while several species have only three toes. Many woodpeckers have the habit of tapping noisily on tree trunks with their beaks.

- Eurasian wryneck, Jynx torquilla
- Middle spotted woodpecker, Dendrocoptes medius
- White-backed woodpecker, Dendrocopos leucotos
- Great spotted woodpecker, Dendrocopos major
- Syrian woodpecker, Dendrocopos syriacus
- Lesser spotted woodpecker, Dryobates minor
- Eurasian green woodpecker, Picus viridis
- Black woodpecker, Dryocopus martius

== Falcons and caracaras ==
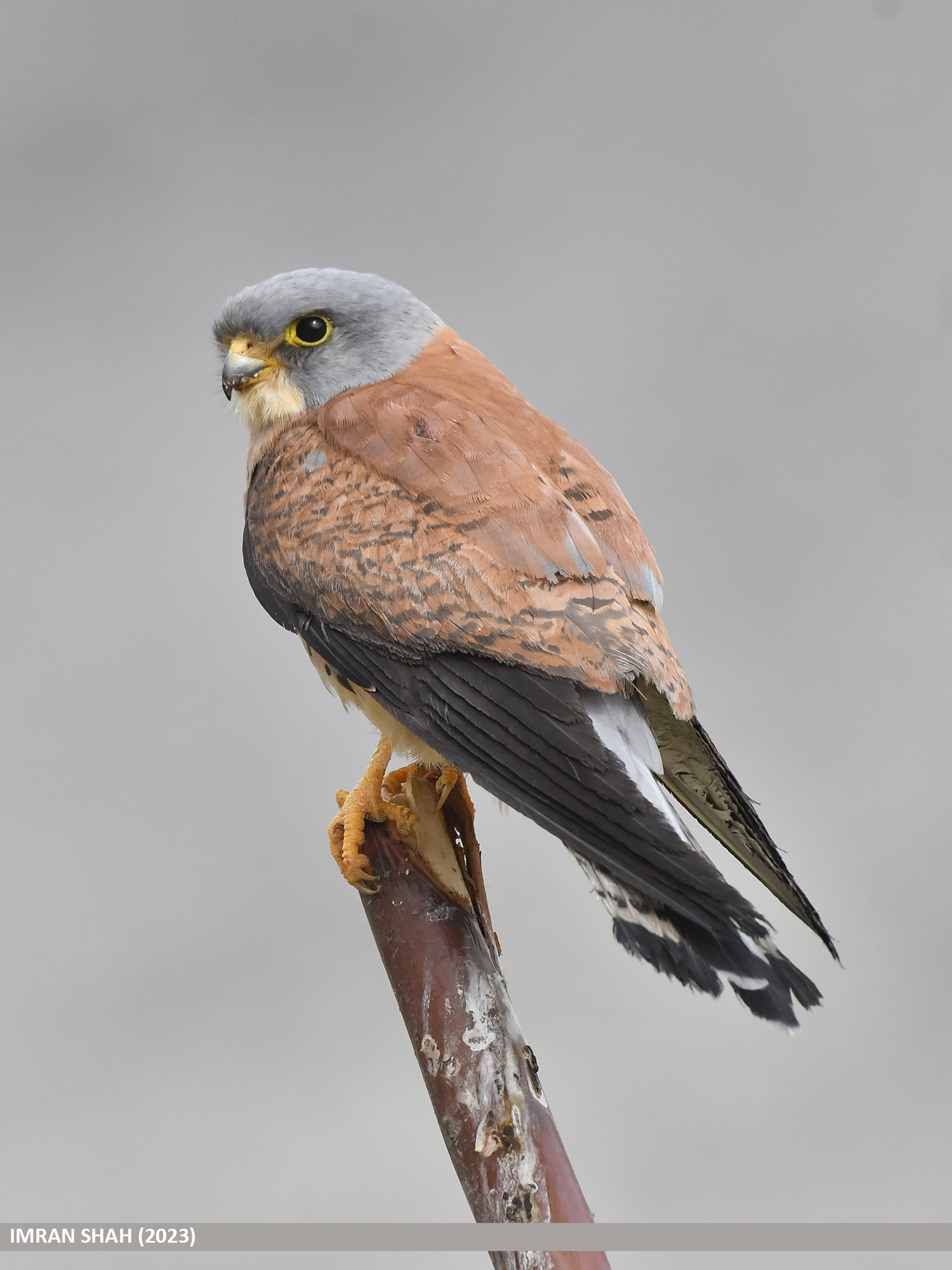
Lesser kestrel

Order: Falconiformes Family: Falconidae

Falconidae is a family of diurnal birds of prey. They differ from hawks, eagles and kites in that they kill with their beaks instead of their talons. T

- Lesser kestrel, Falco naumanni
- Eurasian kestrel, Falco tinnunculus
- Red-footed falcon, Falco vespertinus
- Eleonora's falcon, Falco eleonorae (A)
- Merlin, Falco columbarius
- Eurasian hobby, Falco subbuteo
- Lanner falcon, Falco biarmicus
- Saker falcon, Falco cherrug
- Peregrine falcon, Falco peregrinus

== Old World orioles ==
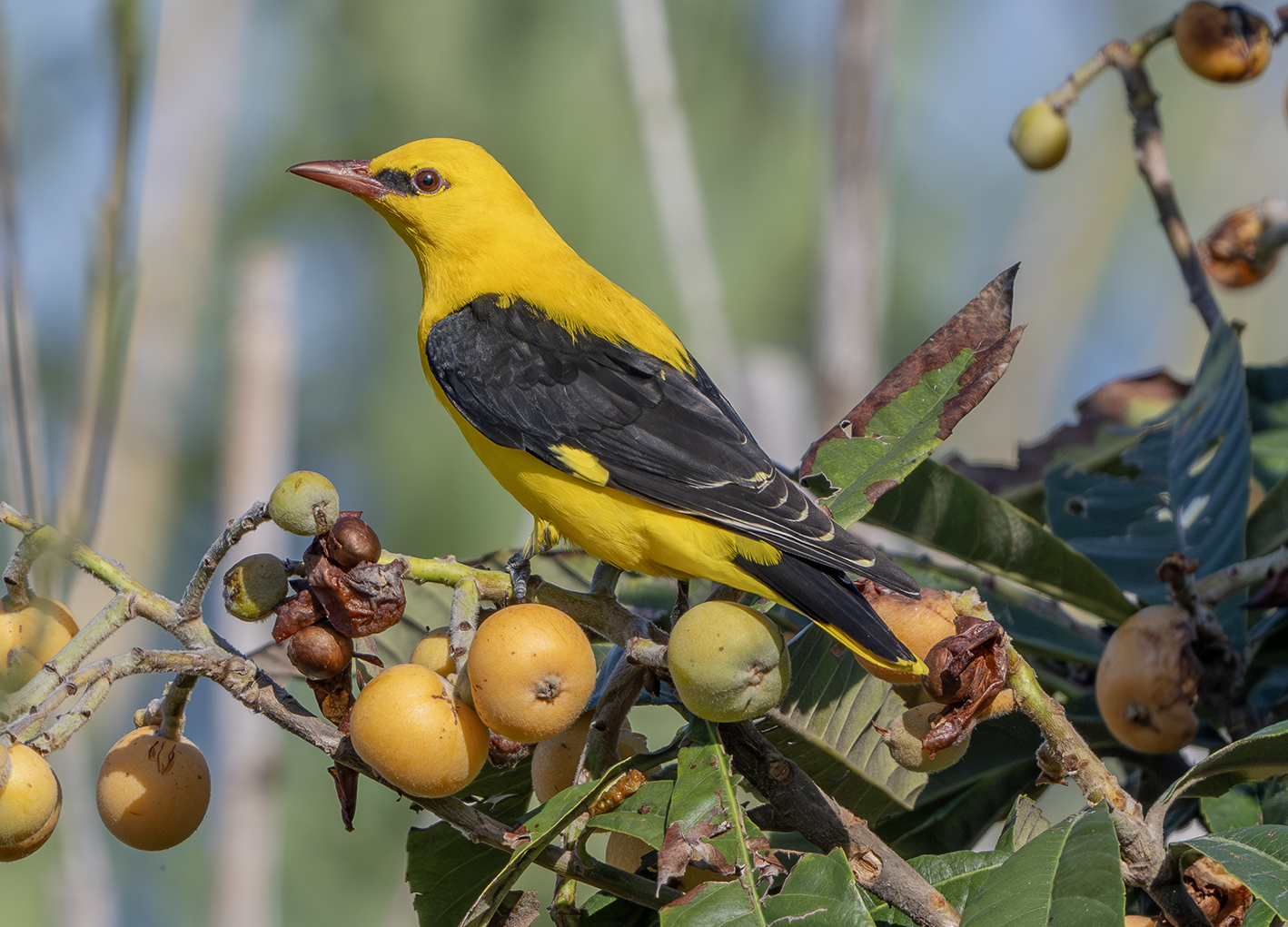
Eurasian golden oriole

Order: Passeriformes Family: Oriolidae

The Old World orioles are colourful passerine birds. They are not related to the New World orioles.

- Eurasian golden oriole, Oriolus oriolus

== Shrikes ==
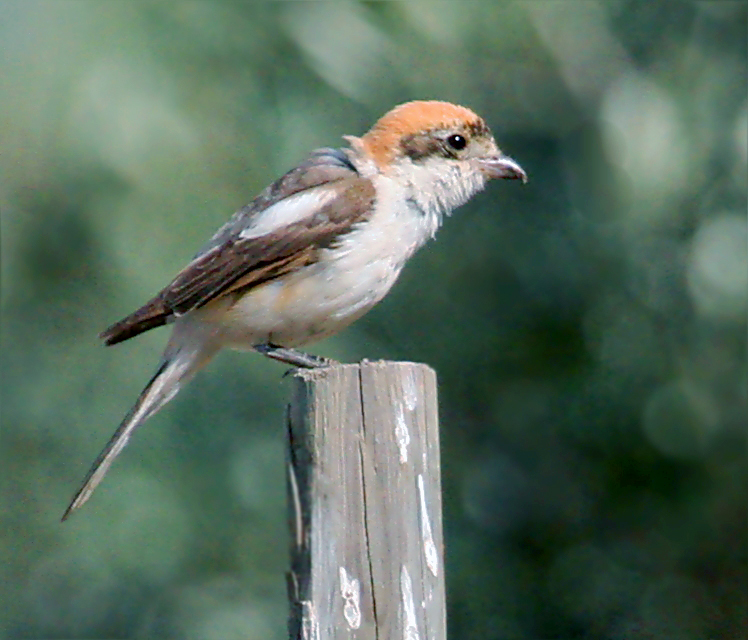
Woodchat shrike

Order: Passeriformes Family: Laniidae

Shrikes are passerine birds known for their habit of catching other birds and small animals and impaling the uneaten portions of their bodies on thorns. A typical shrike's beak is hooked, like a bird of prey.

- Red-backed shrike, Lanius collurio
- Red-tailed shrike, Lanius phoenicuroides
- Great grey shrike, Lanius excubitor
- Lesser grey shrike, Lanius minor
- Masked shrike, Lanius nubicus (A)
- Woodchat shrike, Lanius senator

== Crows, jays, and magpies ==
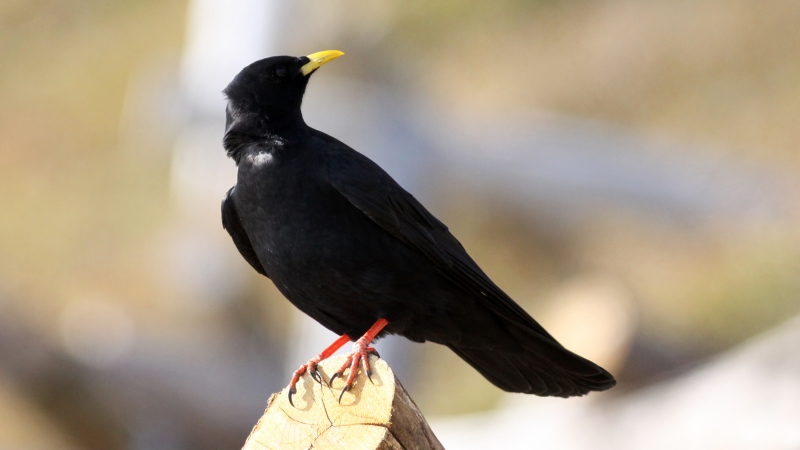
Alpine chough

Order: Passeriformes Family: Corvidae

The family Corvidae includes crows, ravens, jays, choughs, magpies, treepies, nutcrackers and ground jays. Corvids are above average in size among the Passeriformes, and some of the larger species show high levels of intelligence.

- Eurasian jay, Garrulus glandarius
- Eurasian magpie, Pica pica
- Red-billed chough, Pyrrhocorax pyrrhocorax
- Alpine chough, Pyrrhocorax graculus
- Western jackdaw, Corvus monedula
- Rook, Corvus frugilegus
- Carrion crow, Corvus corone
- Common raven, Corvus corax
- Hooded crow, Corvus cornix

== Tits, chickadees, and titmice ==
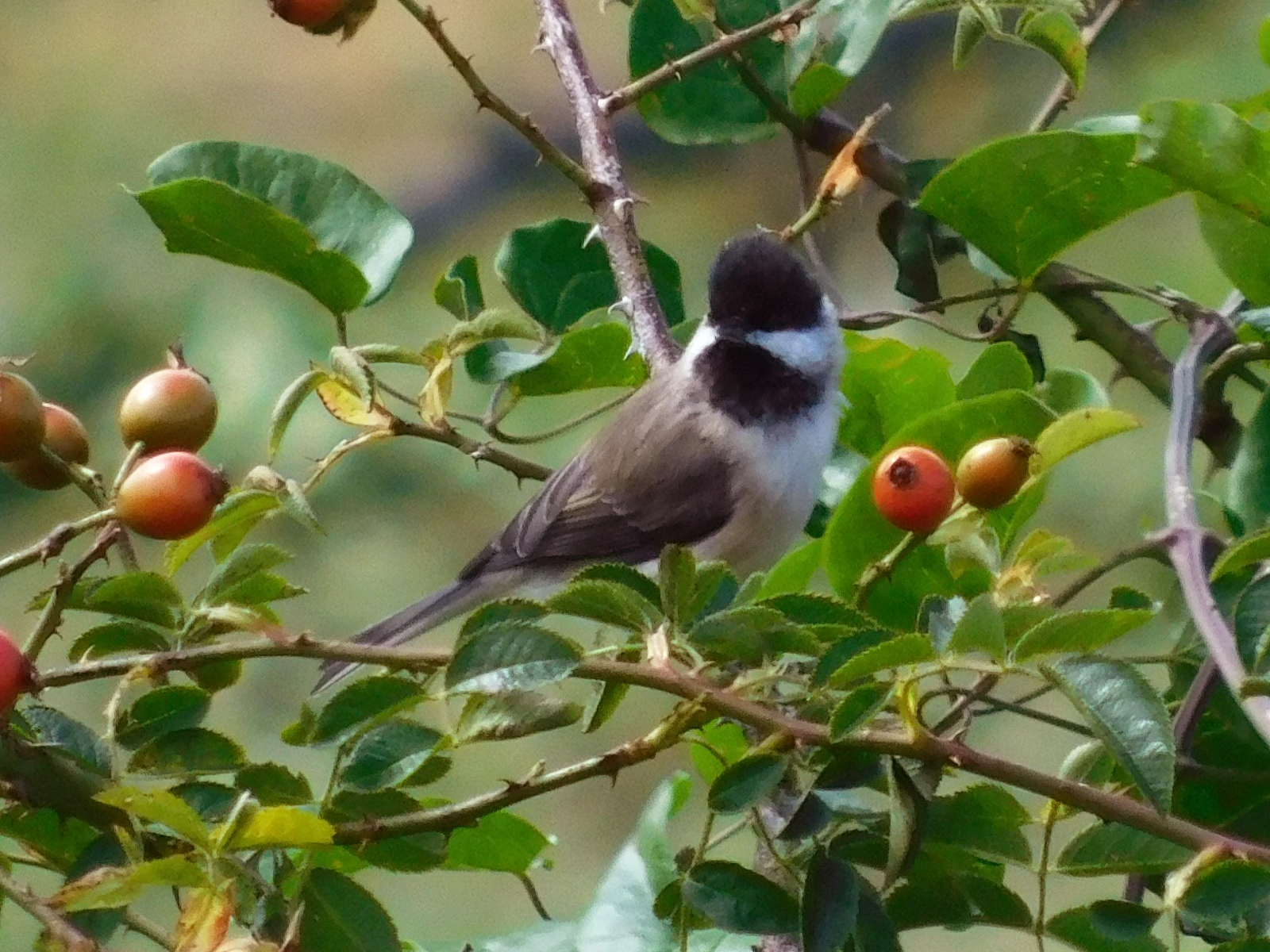
Sombre tit

Order: Passeriformes Family: Paridae

The Paridae are mainly small stocky woodland species with short stout bills. Some have crests. They are adaptable birds, with a mixed diet including seeds and insects.

- Coal tit, Periparus ater
- Crested tit, Lophophanes cristatus (A)
- Sombre tit, Poecile lugubris
- Eurasian blue tit, Cyanistes caeruleus
- Great tit, Parus major

== Penduline tits ==
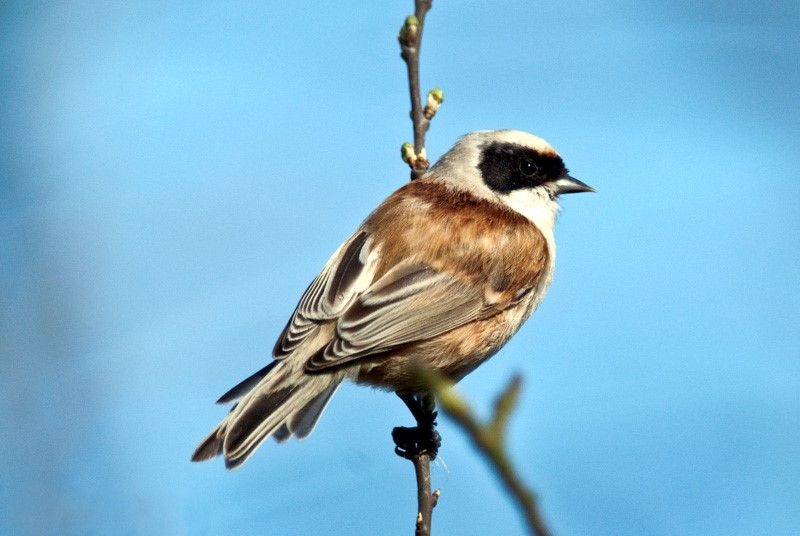
Eurasian penduline tit

Order: Passeriformes Family: Remizidae

The penduline tits are a group of small passerine birds related to the true tits. They are insectivores.

- Eurasian penduline tit, Remiz pendulinus

== Larks ==
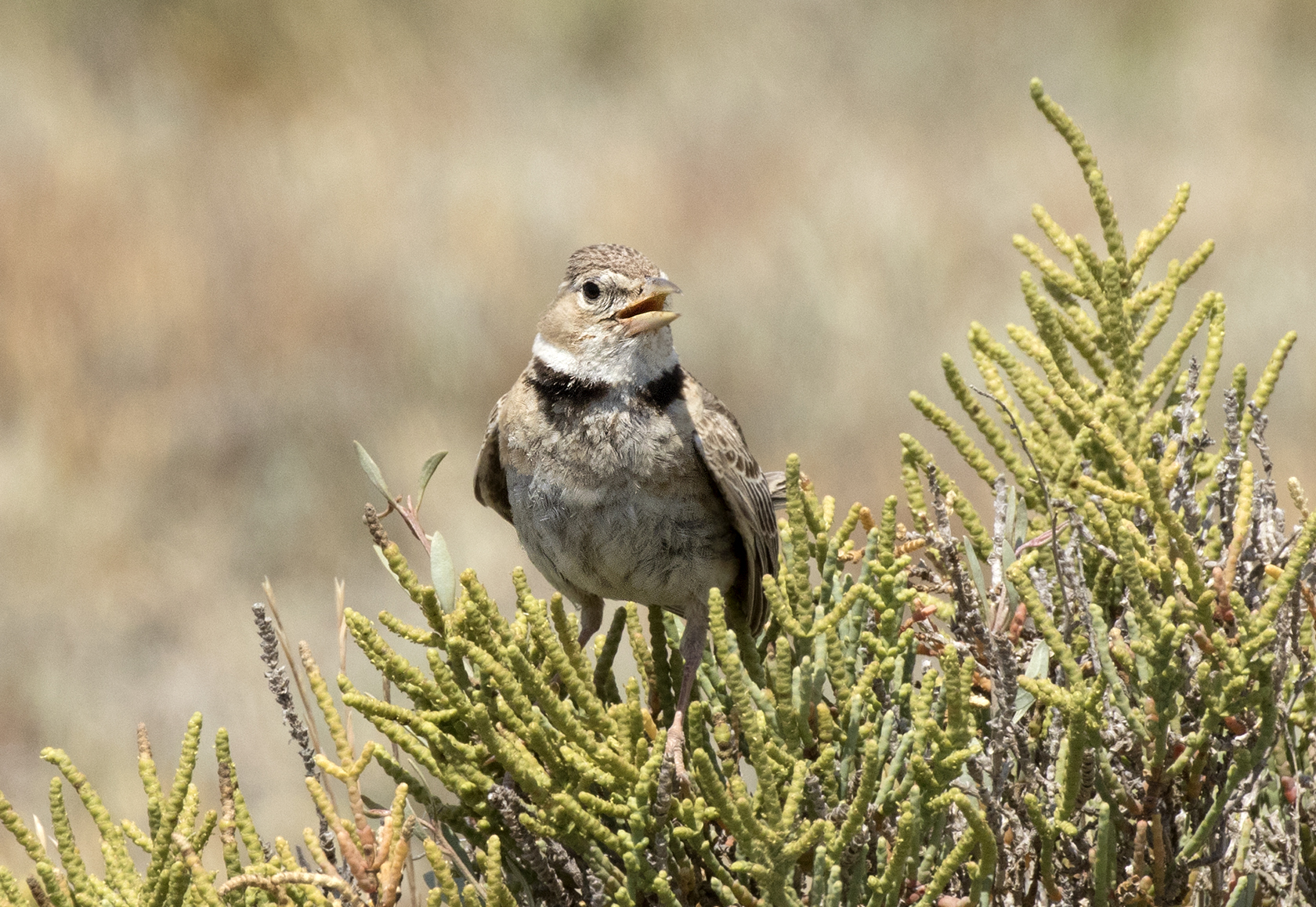
Calandra lark

Order: Passeriformes Family: Alaudidae

Larks are small terrestrial birds with often extravagant songs and display flights. Most larks are fairly dull in appearance. Their food is insects and seeds.

- Horned lark, Eremophila alpestris
- Greater short-toed lark, Calandrella brachydactyla
- Bimaculated lark, Melanocorypha bimaculata
- Calandra lark, Melanocorypha calandra
- Black lark, Melanocorypha yeltoniensis (A)
- Turkestan short-toed lark, Alaudala heinei
- Wood lark, Lullula arborea
- Eurasian skylark, Alauda arvensis
- Oriental skylark, Alauda gulgula (A)
- Crested lark, Galerida cristata

== Bearded reedling ==
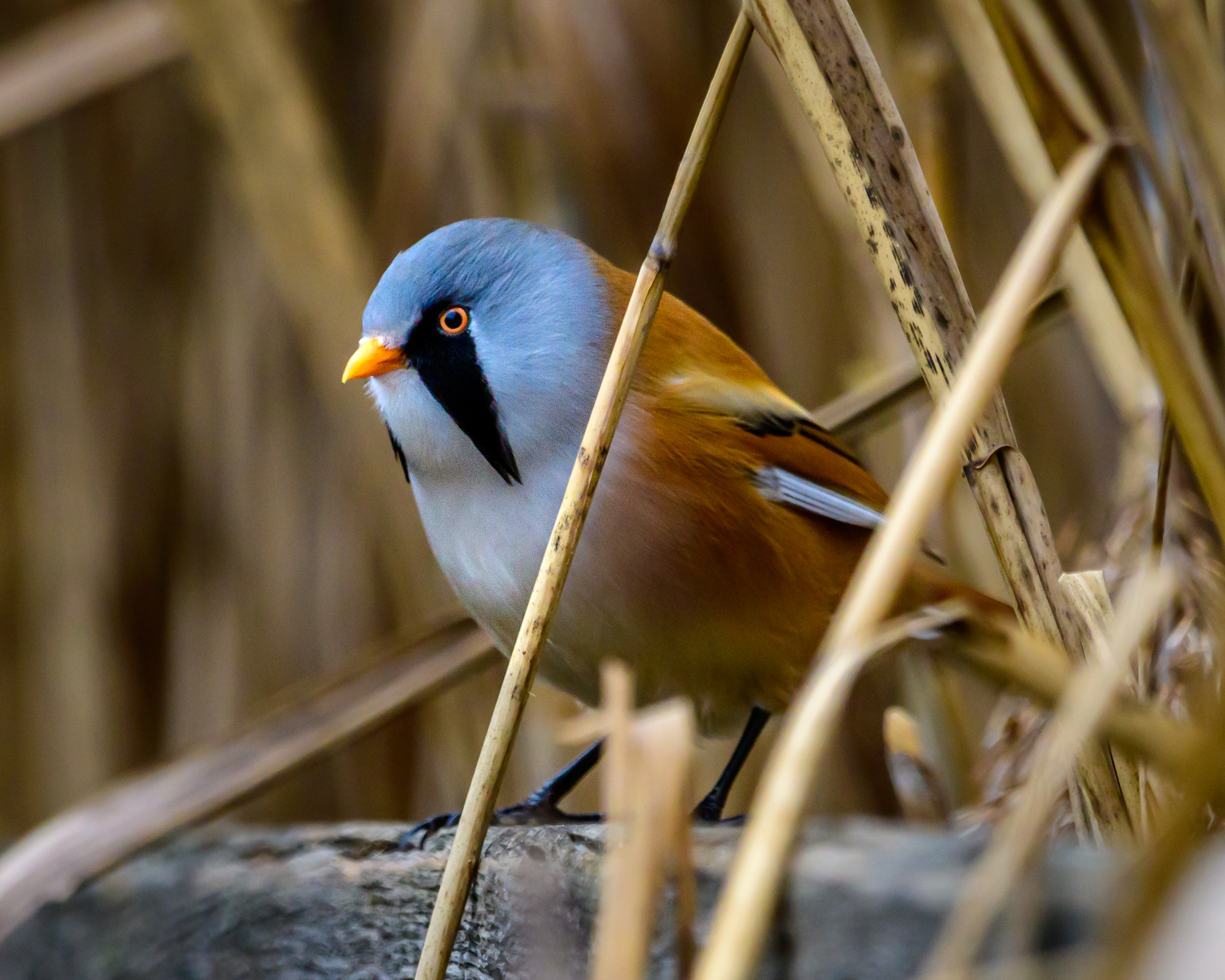
Bearded reedling

Order: Passeriformes Family: Panuridae

This species, the only one in its family, is found in reed beds throughout temperate Europe and Asia.

- Bearded reedling, Panurus biarmicus

== Cisticolas and allies ==
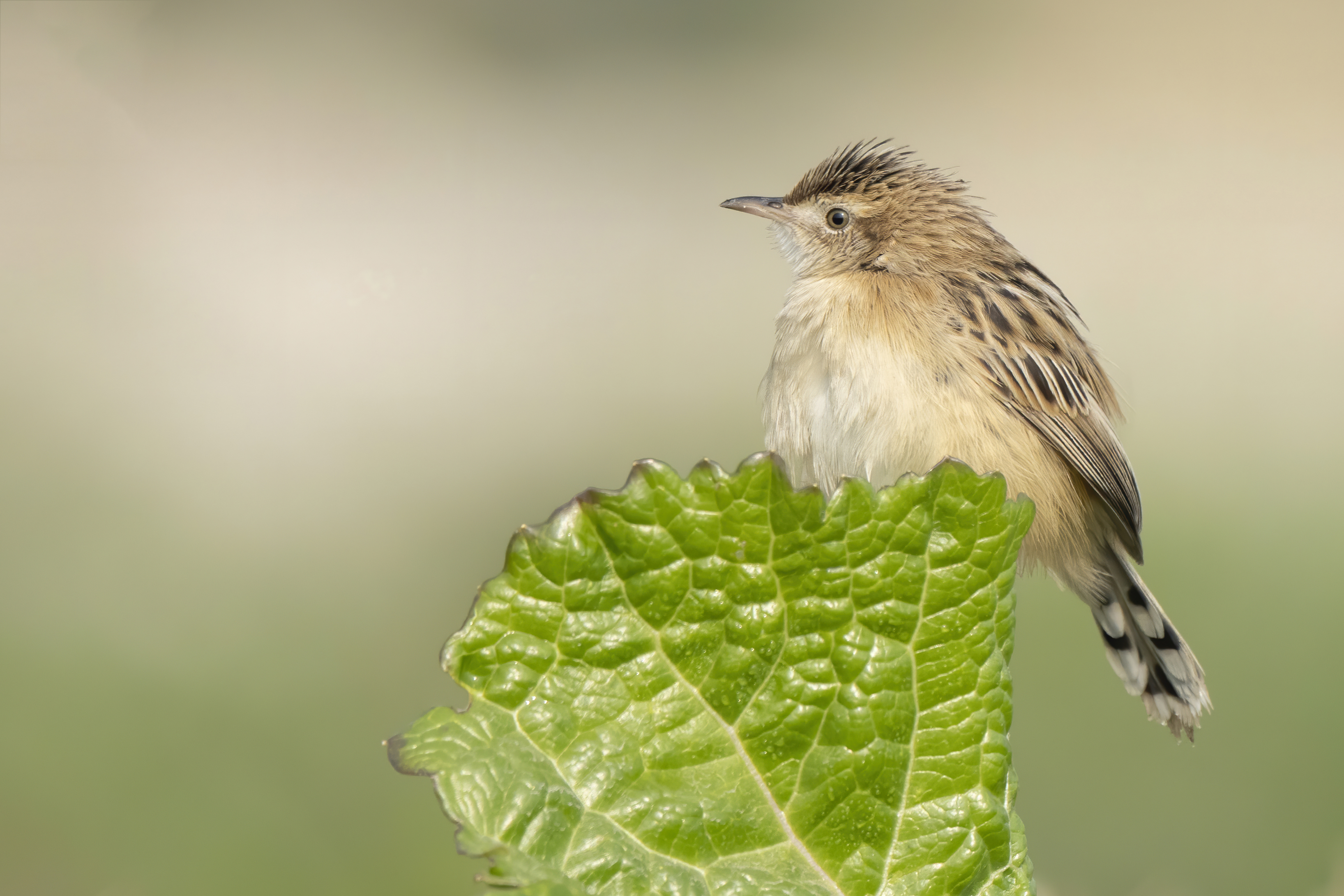
Zitting cisticola

Order: Passeriformes Family: Cisticolidae

The Cisticolidae are warblers found mainly in warmer southern regions of the Old World. They are generally very small birds of drab brown or grey appearance found in open country such as grassland or scrub.

- Zitting cisticola, Cisticola juncidis (A)

== Reed warblers and allies ==
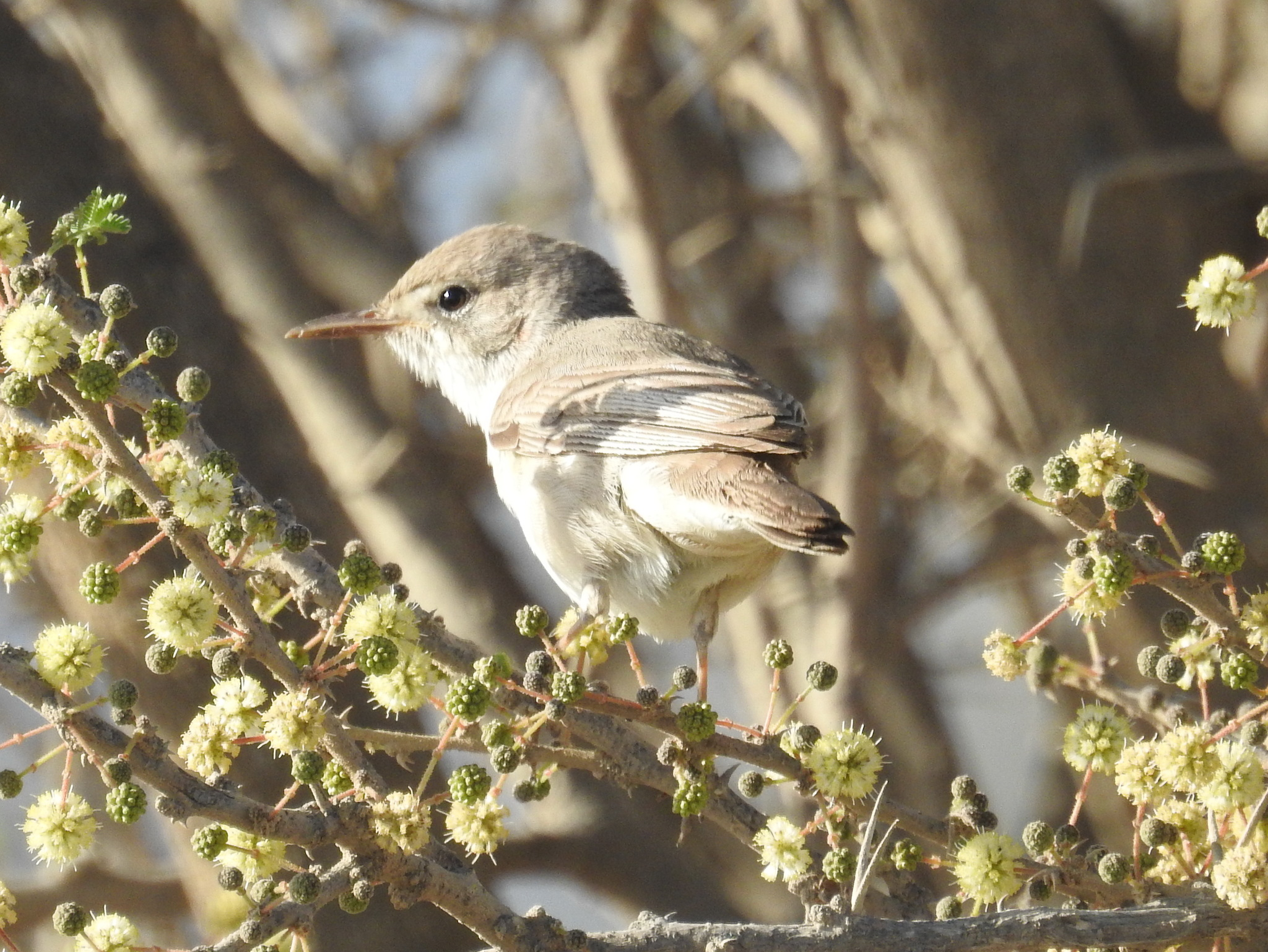
Upcher's warbler

Order: Passeriformes Family: Acrocephalidae

The members of this family are usually rather large for "warblers". Most are rather plain olivaceous brown above with much yellow to beige below. They are usually found in open woodland, reedbeds, or tall grass. The family occurs mostly in southern to western Eurasia and surroundings, but it also ranges far into the Pacific, with some species in Africa.

- Booted warbler, Iduna caligata (A)
- Eastern olivaceous warbler, Iduna pallida
- Upcher's warbler, Hippolais languida
- Olive-tree warbler, Hippolais olivetorum (A)
- Icterine warbler, Hippolais icterina
- Moustached warbler, Acrocephalus melanopogon
- Sedge warbler, Acrocephalus schoenobaenus
- Paddyfield warbler, Acrocephalus agricola
- Marsh warbler, Acrocephalus palustris
- Common reed warbler, Acrocephalus scirpaceus
- Great reed warbler, Acrocephalus arundinaceus

== Grassbirds and allies ==
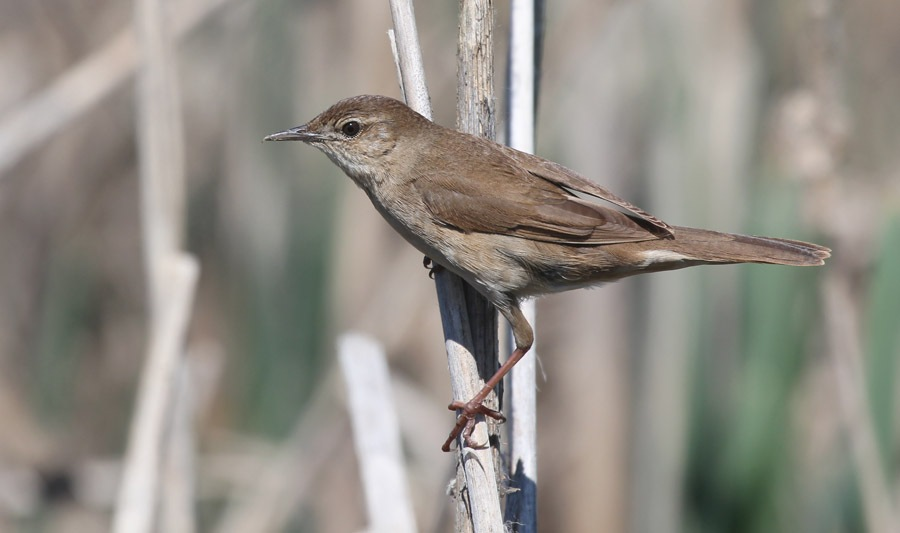
Savi's warbler

Order: Passeriformes Family: Locustellidae

Locustellidae are a family of small insectivorous songbirds found mainly in Eurasia, Africa, and the Australian region. They are smallish birds with tails that are usually long and pointed, and tend to be drab brownish or buffy all over.

- River warbler, Locustella fluviatilis
- Savi's warbler, Locustella luscinioides
- Common grasshopper warbler, Locustella naevia

== Swallows ==
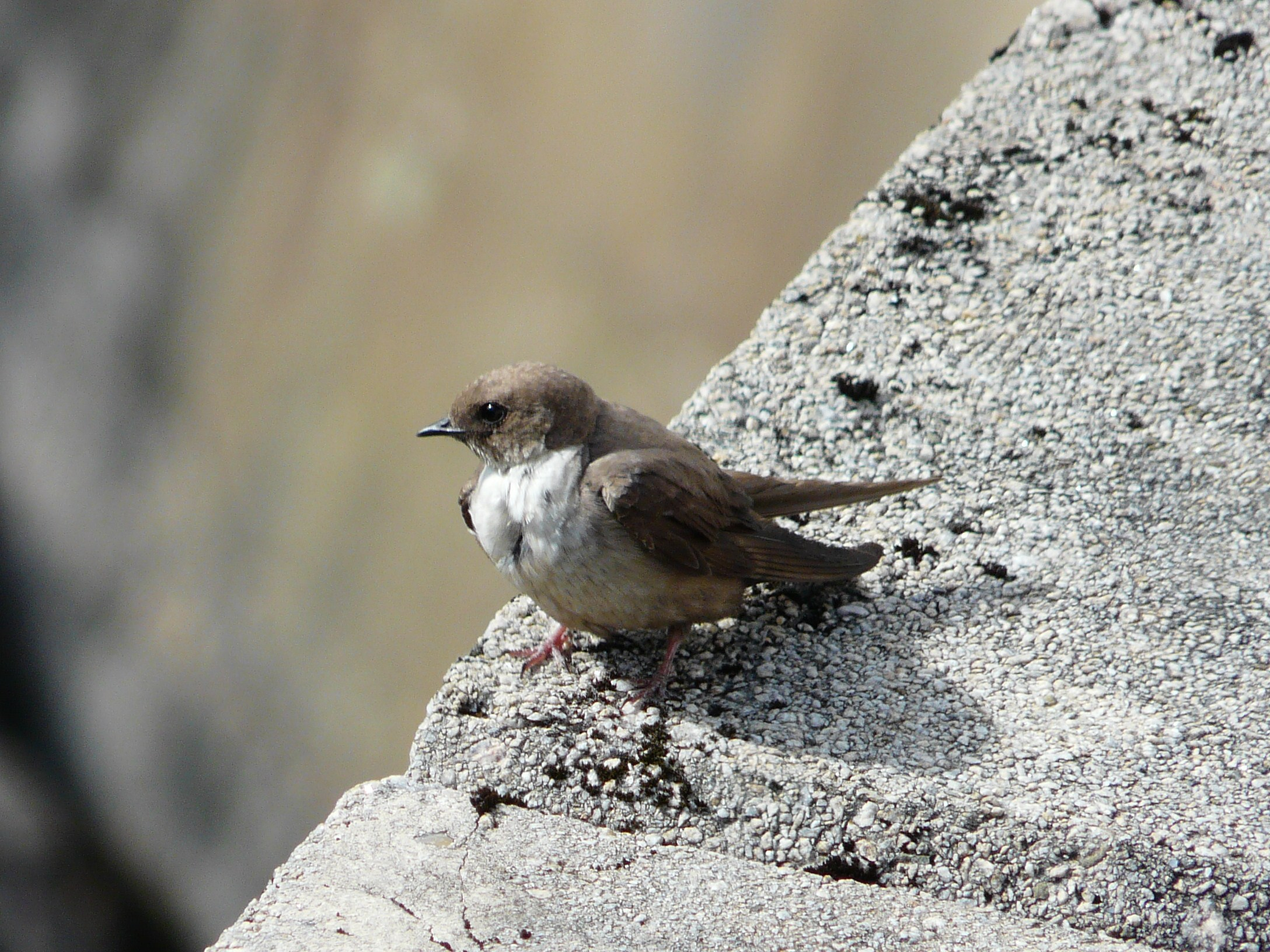
Eurasian crag-martin

Order: Passeriformes Family: Hirundinidae

The family Hirundinidae is adapted to aerial feeding. They have a slender streamlined body, long pointed wings and a short bill with a wide gape. The feet are adapted to perching rather than walking, and the front toes are partially joined at the base.

- Bank swallow, Riparia riparia
- Eurasian crag martin, Ptyonoprogne rupestris
- Barn swallow, Hirundo rustica
- European red-rumped swallow, Cecropis rufula
- Western house martin, Delichon urbicum

== Bulbuls ==
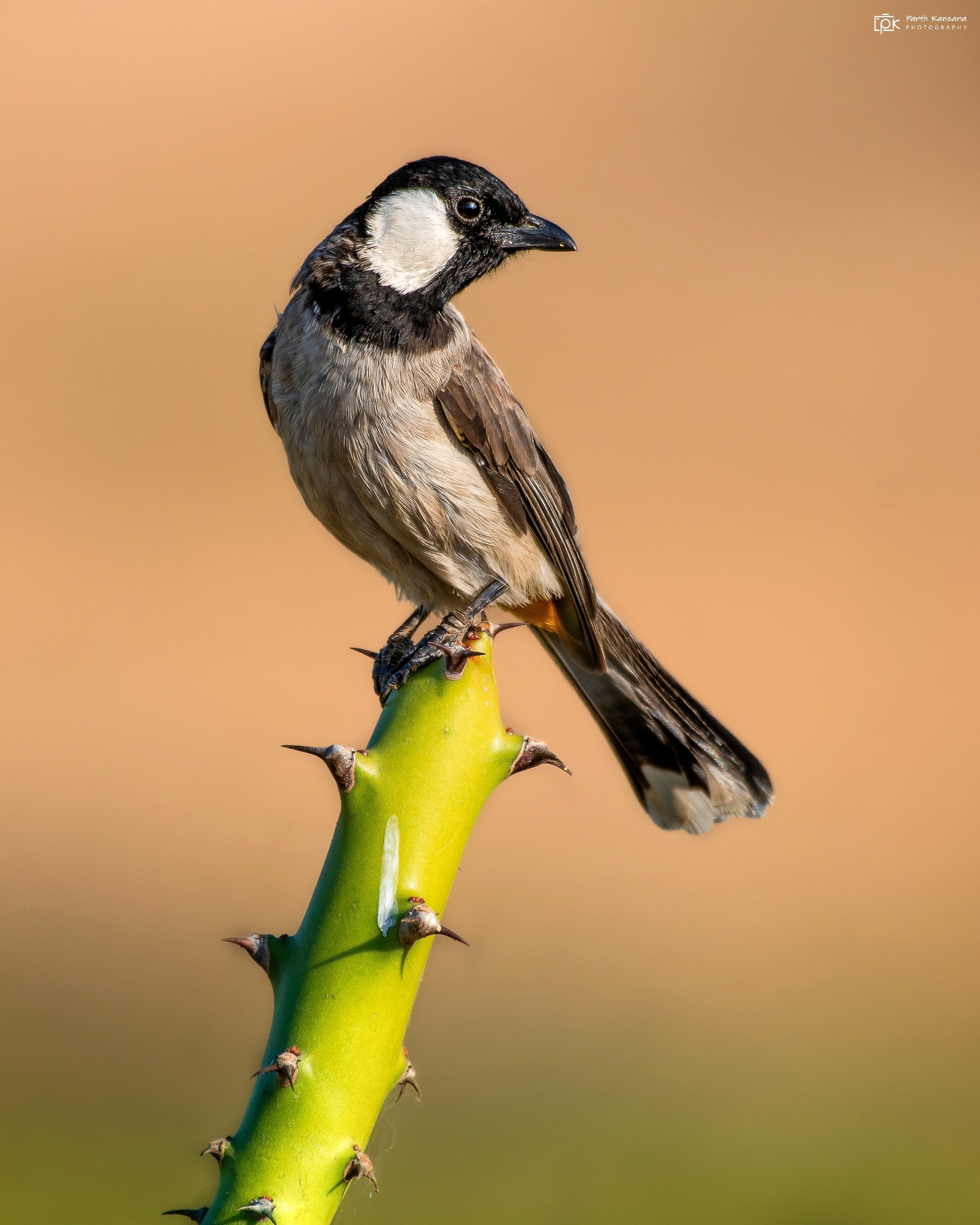
White-eared bulbul

Order: Passeriformes Family: Pycnonotidae

Bulbuls are medium-sized passerine songbirds. The family is distributed across Africa, Middle East, tropical Asia, Indonesia, and Japan.

- White-eared bulbul, Pycnonotus leucotis (A)

== Leaf warblers ==
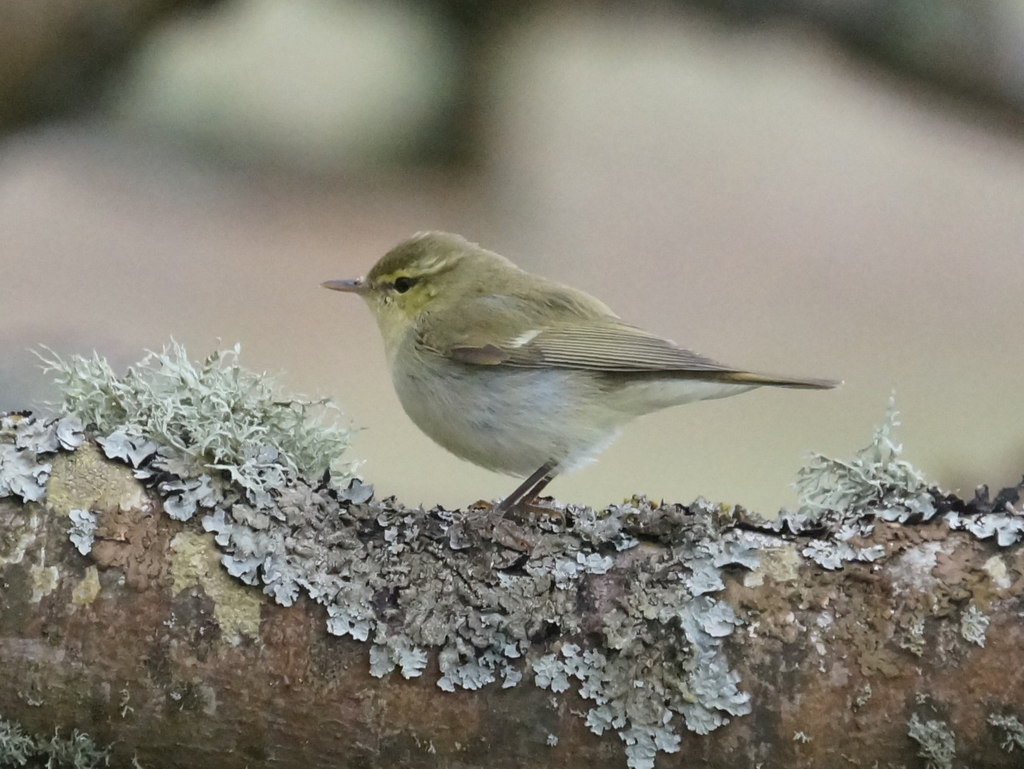
Green warbler

Order: Passeriformes Family: Phylloscopidae

Leaf warblers are a family of small insectivorous birds found mostly in Eurasia and ranging into Wallacea and Africa. The species are of various sizes, often green-plumaged above and yellow below, or more subdued with greyish-green to greyish-brown colours.

- Wood warbler, Phylloscopus sibilatrix
- Eastern Bonelli's warbler, Phylloscopus orientalis (A)
- Willow warbler, Phylloscopus trochilus
- Mountain chiffchaff, Phylloscopus sindianus
- Common chiffchaff, Phylloscopus collybita
- Green warbler, Phylloscopus nitidus

== Bush warblers and allies ==
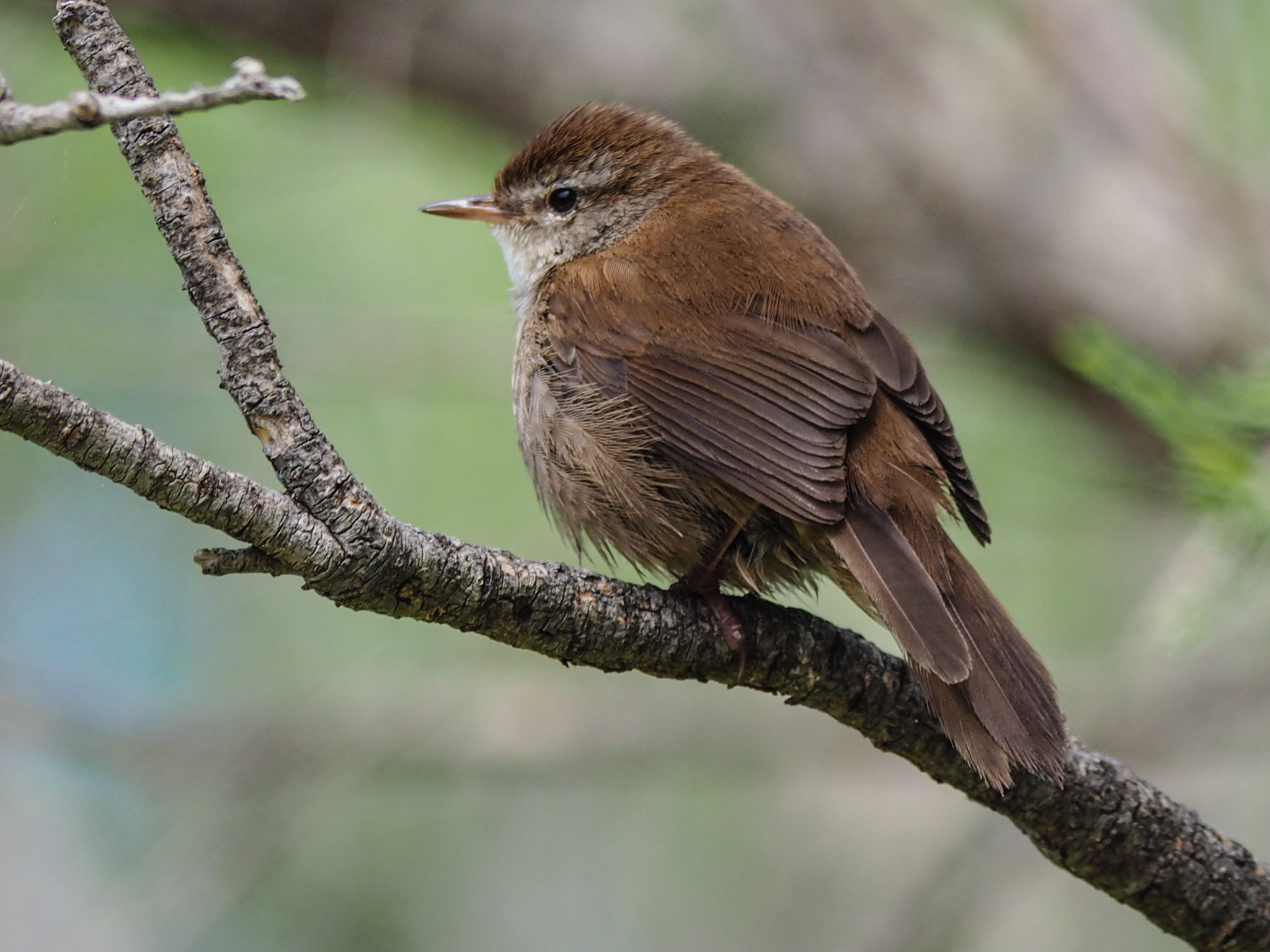
Cetti's warbler

Order: Passeriformes Family: Cettiidae

The members of this family are found throughout Africa, Asia, and Polynesia. Their taxonomy is in flux, and some authorities place some genera in other families.

- Cetti's warbler, Cettia cetti

== Long-tailed tits ==
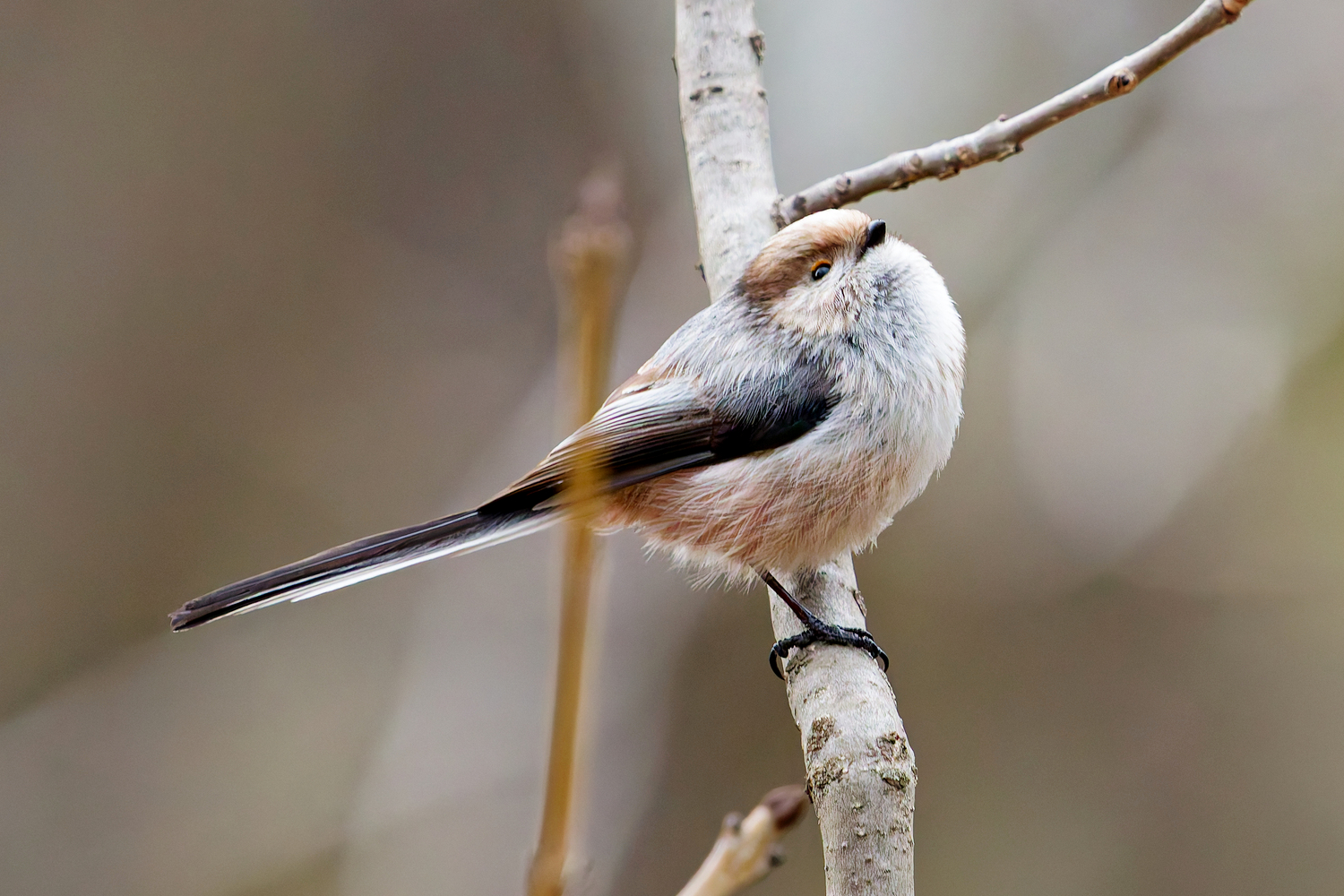
Long-tailed tit

Order: Passeriformes Family: Aegithalidae

Long-tailed tits are a group of small passerine birds with medium to long tails. They make woven bag nests in trees. Most eat a mixed diet which includes insects.

- Long-tailed tit, Aegithalos caudatus

== Sylviid warblers, parrotbills, and allies ==
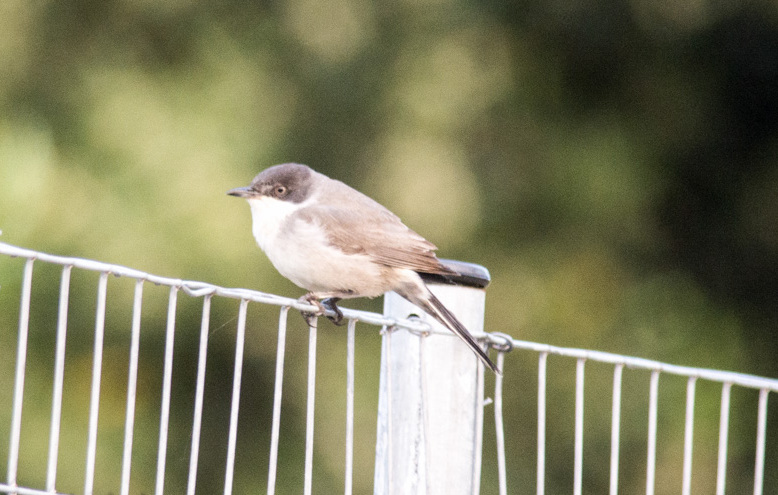
Eastern Orphean warbler

Order: Passeriformes Family: Sylviidae

The family Sylviidae is a group of small insectivorous passerine birds. They mainly occur as breeding species, as the common name implies, in Europe, Asia and, to a lesser extent, Africa. Most are of generally undistinguished appearance, but many have distinctive songs.

- Eurasian blackcap, Sylvia atricapilla
- Garden warbler, Sylvia borin
- Barred warbler, Curruca nisoria
- Lesser whitethroat, Curruca curruca
- Eastern Orphean warbler, Curruca crassirostris
- Menetries's warbler, Curruca mystacea
- Greater whitethroat, Curruca communis

== Crests ==
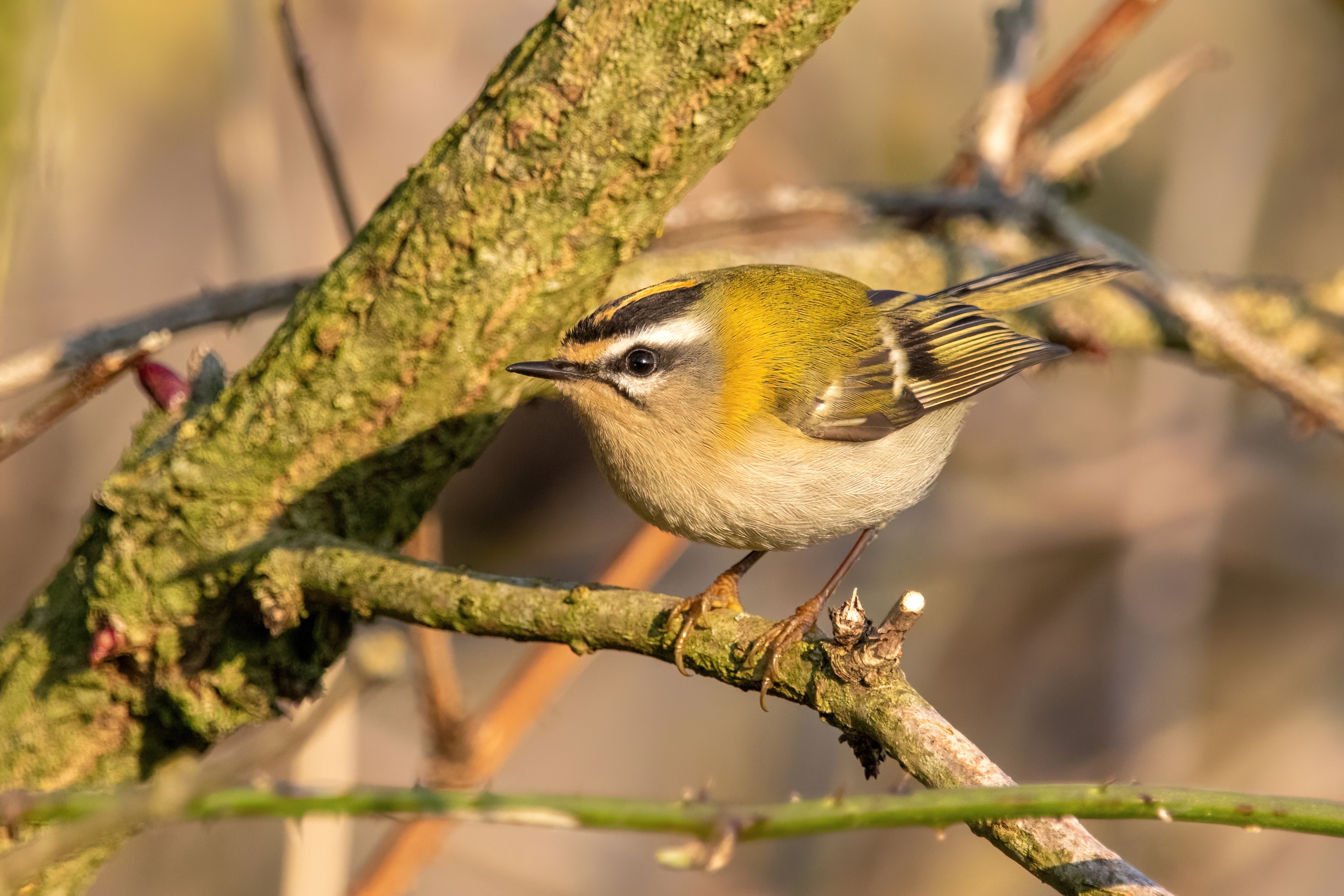
Common firecrest

Order: Passeriformes Family: Regulidae

The crests, also called kinglets, are a small group of birds formerly included in the Old World warblers, but now given family status because they are genetically distant from them.

- Goldcrest, Regulus regulus
- Common firecrest, Regulus ignicapillus

== Wallcreeper ==
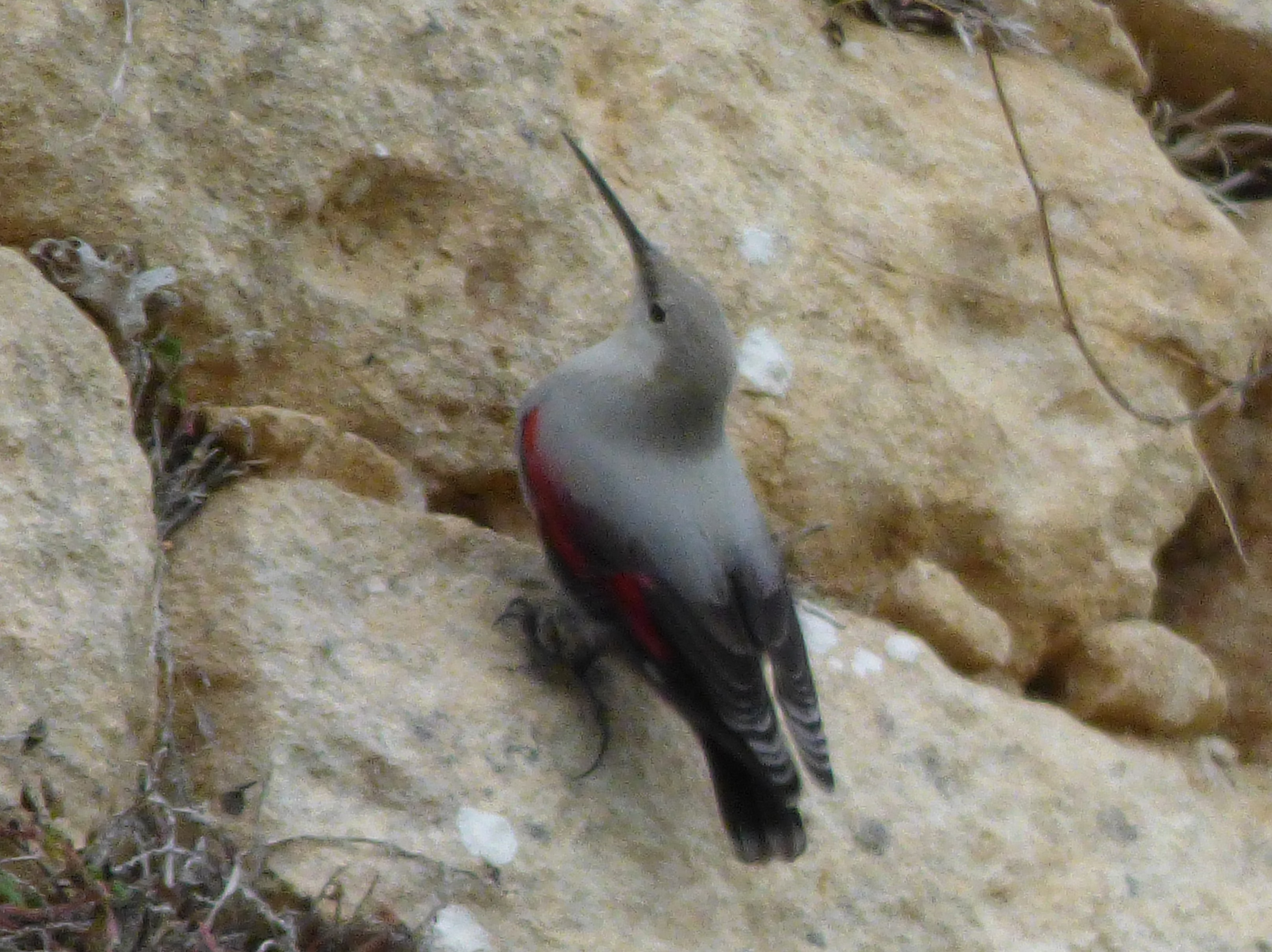
Wallcreeper

Order: Passeriformes Family: Tichodromidae

The wallcreeper is a small bird related to the nuthatch family, which has stunning crimson, grey and black plumage.

- Wallcreeper, Tichodroma muraria (A)

== Nuthatches ==
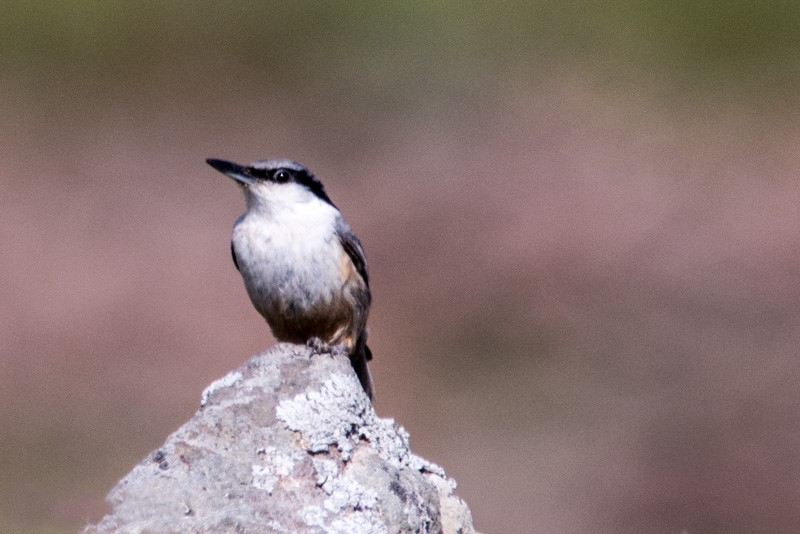
Western rock nuthatch

Order: Passeriformes Family: Sittidae

Nuthatches are small woodland birds. They have the unusual ability to climb down trees head first, unlike other birds which can only go upwards. Nuthatches have big heads, short tails and powerful bills and feet.

- Eurasian nuthatch, Sitta europaea
- Western rock nuthatch, Sitta neumayer
- Eastern rock nuthatch, Sitta tephronota

== Treecreepers ==
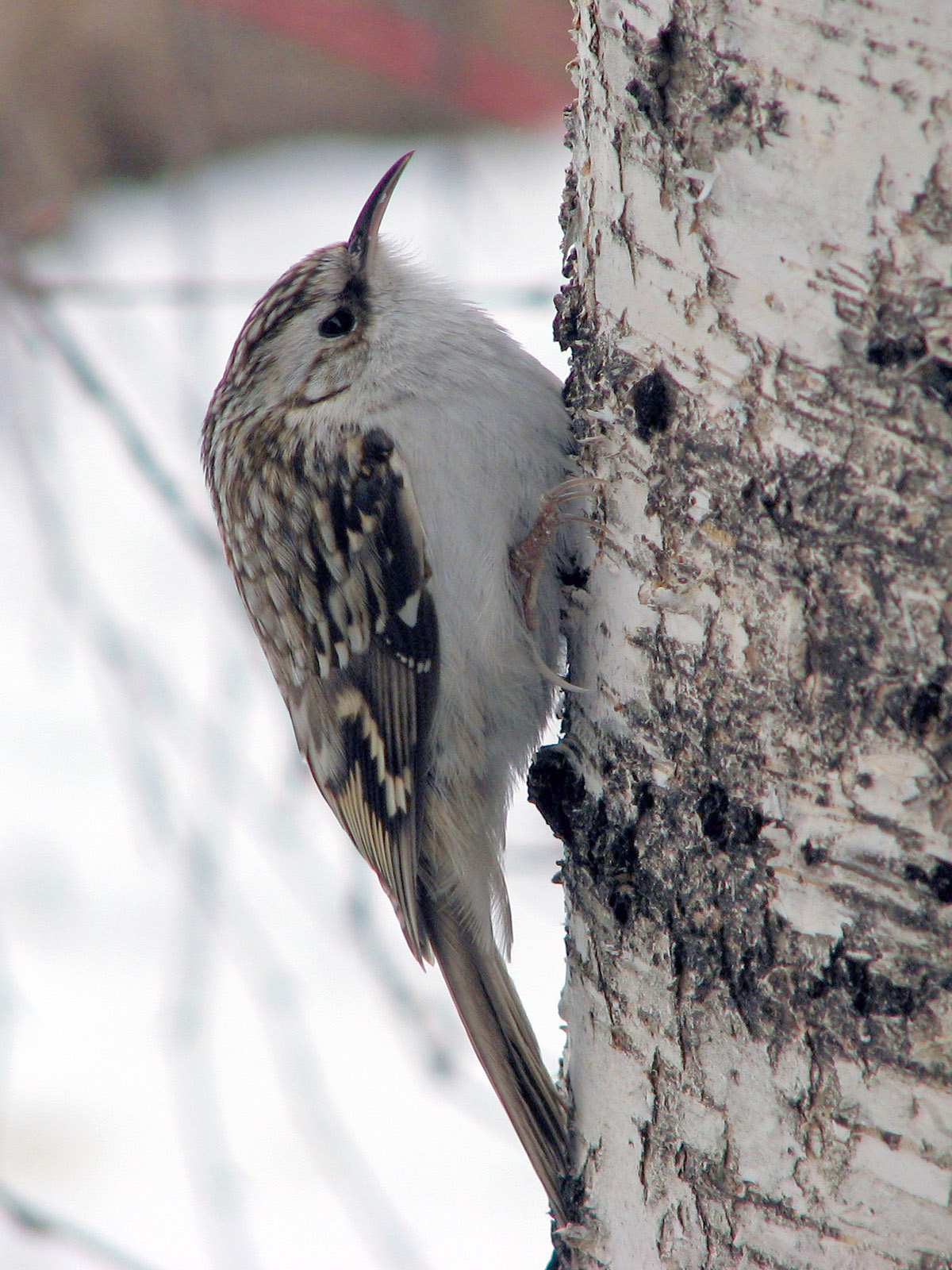
Eurasian treecreeper

Order: Passeriformes Family: Certhiidae

Treecreepers are small woodland birds, brown above and white below. They have thin pointed down-curved bills, which they use to extricate insects from bark. They have stiff tail feathers, like woodpeckers, which they use to support themselves on vertical trees.

- Eurasian treecreeper, Certhia familiaris

== Wrens ==
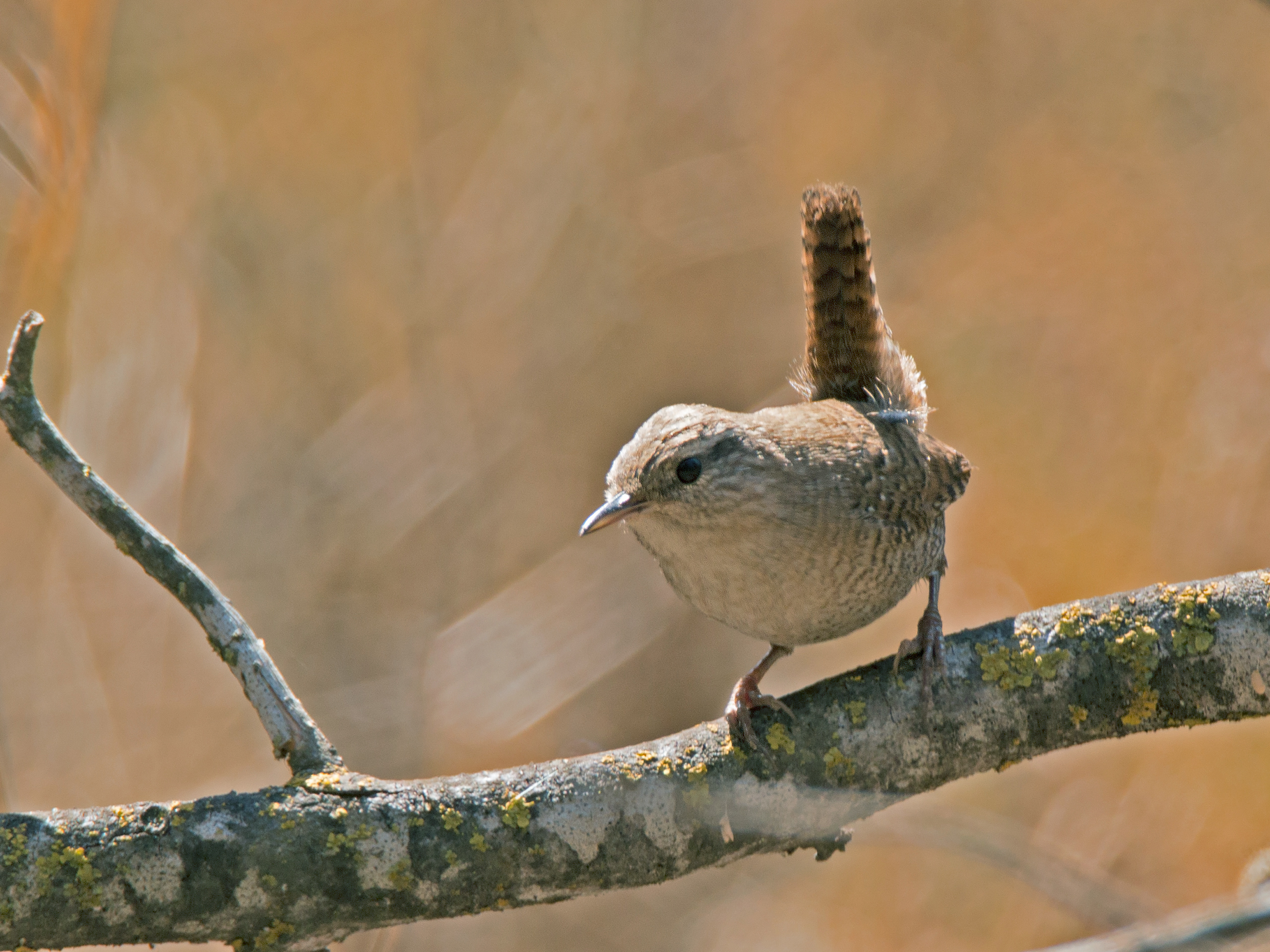
Eurasian wren

Order: Passeriformes Family: Troglodytidae

The wrens are mainly small and inconspicuous except for their loud songs. These birds have short wings and thin down-turned bills. Several species often hold their tails upright. All are insectivorous.

- Eurasian wren, Troglodytes troglodytes

== Dippers ==
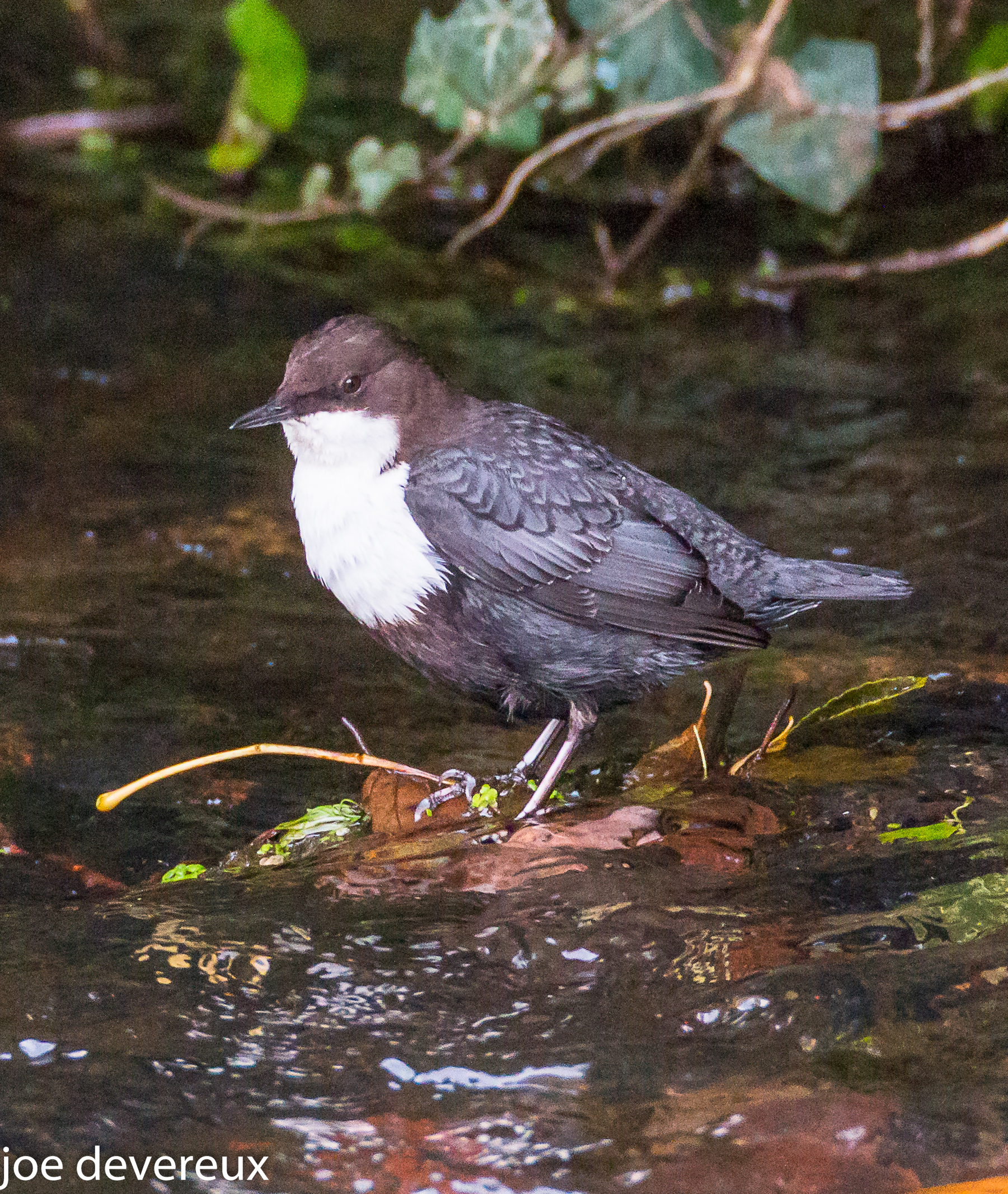
White-throated dipper

Order: Passeriformes Family: Cinclidae

Dippers are a group of perching birds whose habitat includes aquatic environments in the Americas, Europe and Asia. They are named for their bobbing or dipping movements.

- White-throated dipper, Cinclus cinclus

== Starlings ==
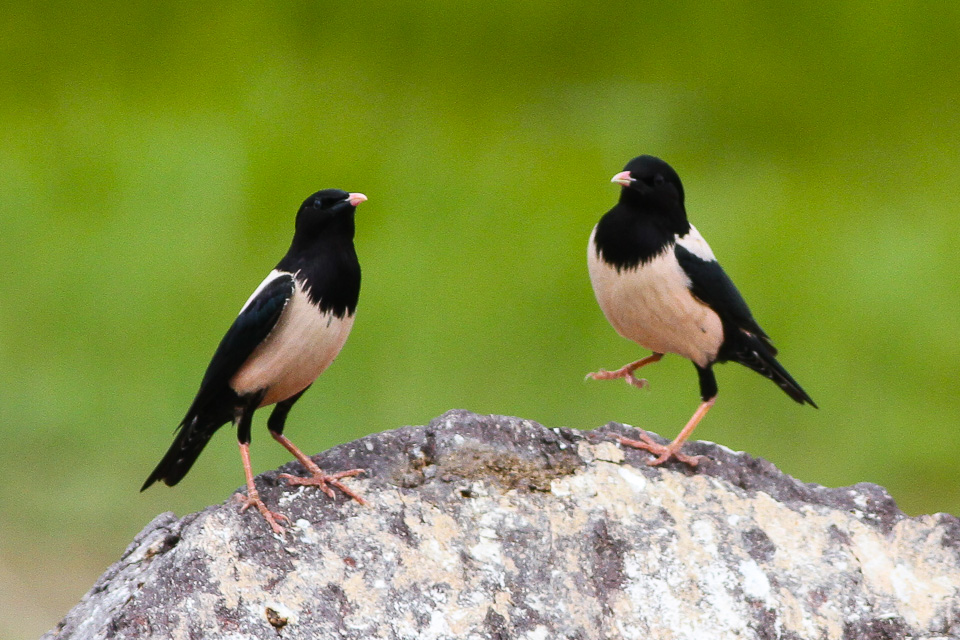
Rosy starling

Order: Passeriformes Family: Sturnidae

Starlings are small to medium-sized passerine birds. Their flight is strong and direct and they are very gregarious. Their preferred habitat is fairly open country. They eat insects and fruit. Plumage is typically dark with a metallic sheen.

- Common starling, Sturnus vulgaris
- Rosy starling, Pastor roseus

== Thrushes and allies ==
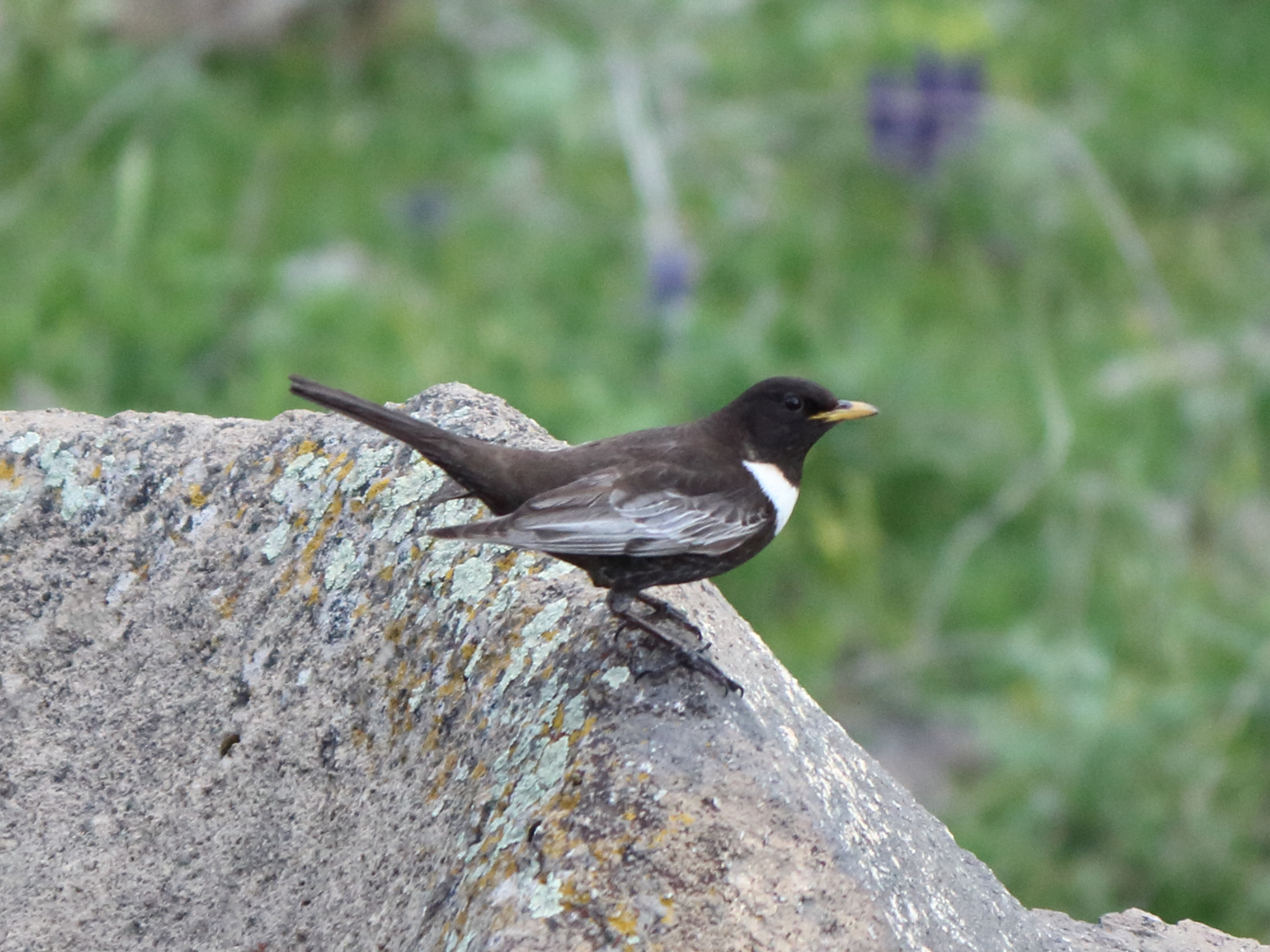
Ring ouzel

Order: Passeriformes Family: Turdidae

The thrushes are a group of passerine birds that occur mainly in the Old World. They are plump, soft plumaged, small to medium-sized insectivores or sometimes omnivores, often feeding on the ground. Many have attractive songs.

- Mistle thrush, Turdus viscivorus
- Song thrush, Turdus philomelos
- Redwing, Turdus iliacus
- Common blackbird, Turdus merula
- Fieldfare, Turdus pilaris
- Ring ouzel, Turdus torquatus
- Black-throated thrush, Turdus atrogularis

== Old World flycatchers ==
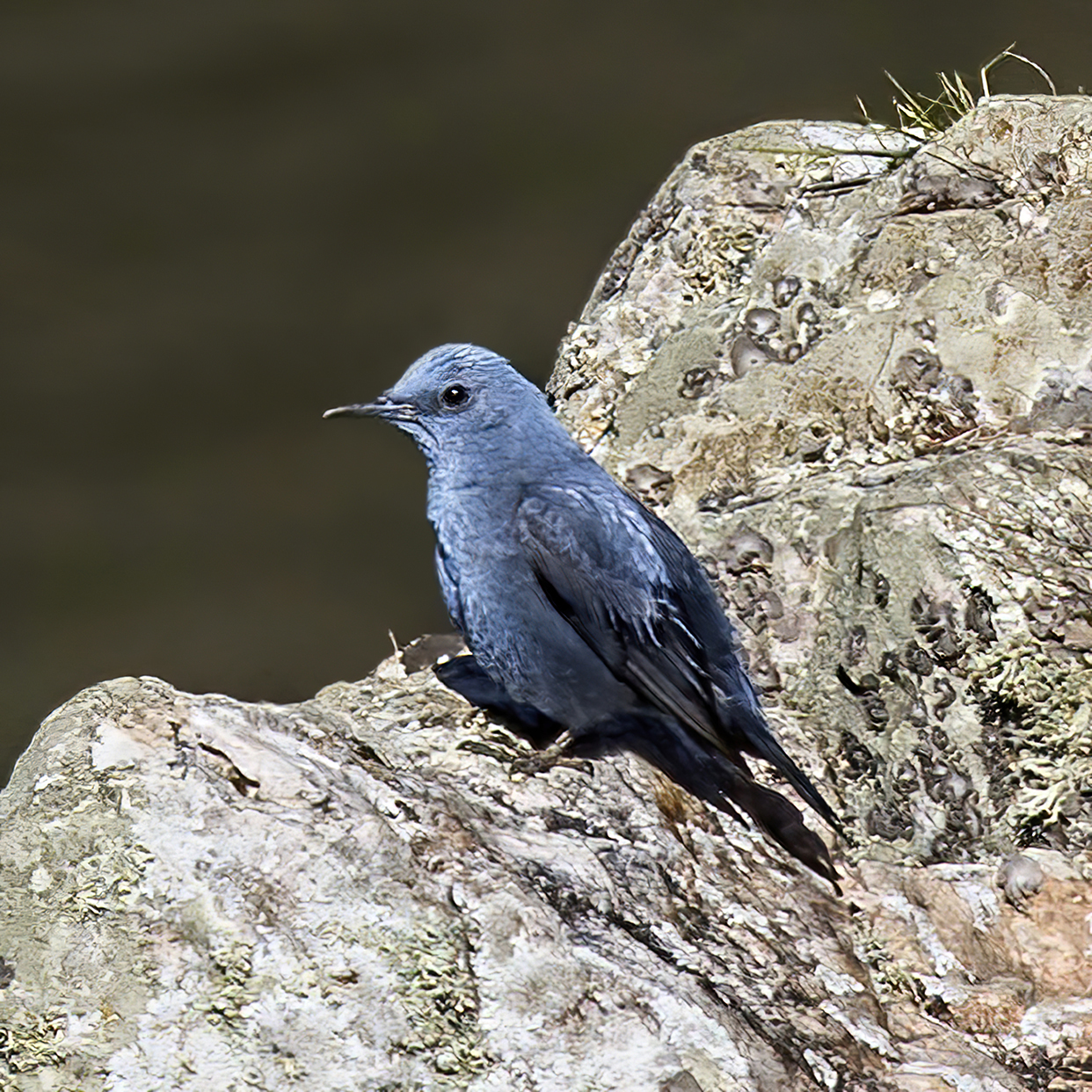
Blue rock thrush

Order: Passeriformes Family: Muscicapidae

Old World flycatchers are a large group of small passerine birds native to the Old World. They are mainly small arboreal insectivores. The appearance of these birds is highly varied, and while some have weak songs and harsh calls, others produce among the most noted bird songs of all.

- Spotted flycatcher, Muscicapa striata
- Rufous-tailed scrub robin, Cercotrichas galactotes
- European robin, Erithacus rubecula
- White-throated robin, Irania gutturalis
- Thrush nightingale, Luscinia luscinia
- Common nightingale, Luscinia megarhynchos (A)
- Bluethroat, Luscinia svecica
- Red-breasted flycatcher, Ficedula parva
- Semicollared flycatcher, Ficedula semitorquata
- European pied flycatcher, Ficedula hypoleuca
- Collared flycatcher, Ficedula albicollis (A)
- Common redstart, Phoenicurus phoenicurus
- White-winged redstart, Phoenicurus erythrogaster (A)
- Black redstart, Phoenicurus ochruros
- Common rock thrush, Monticola saxatilis
- Blue rock thrush, Monticola solitarius
- Whinchat, Saxicola rubetra
- European stonechat, Saxicola rubicola
- Siberian stonechat, Saxicola maurus
- Northern wheatear, Oenanthe oenanthe
- Isabelline wheatear, Oenanthe isabellina
- Desert wheatear, Oenanthe deserti
- Pied wheatear, Oenanthe pleschanka
- Eastern black-eared wheatear, Oenanthe melanoleuca
- Finsch's wheatear, Oenanthe finschii
- Persian wheatear, Oenanthe chrysopygia

== Waxwings ==
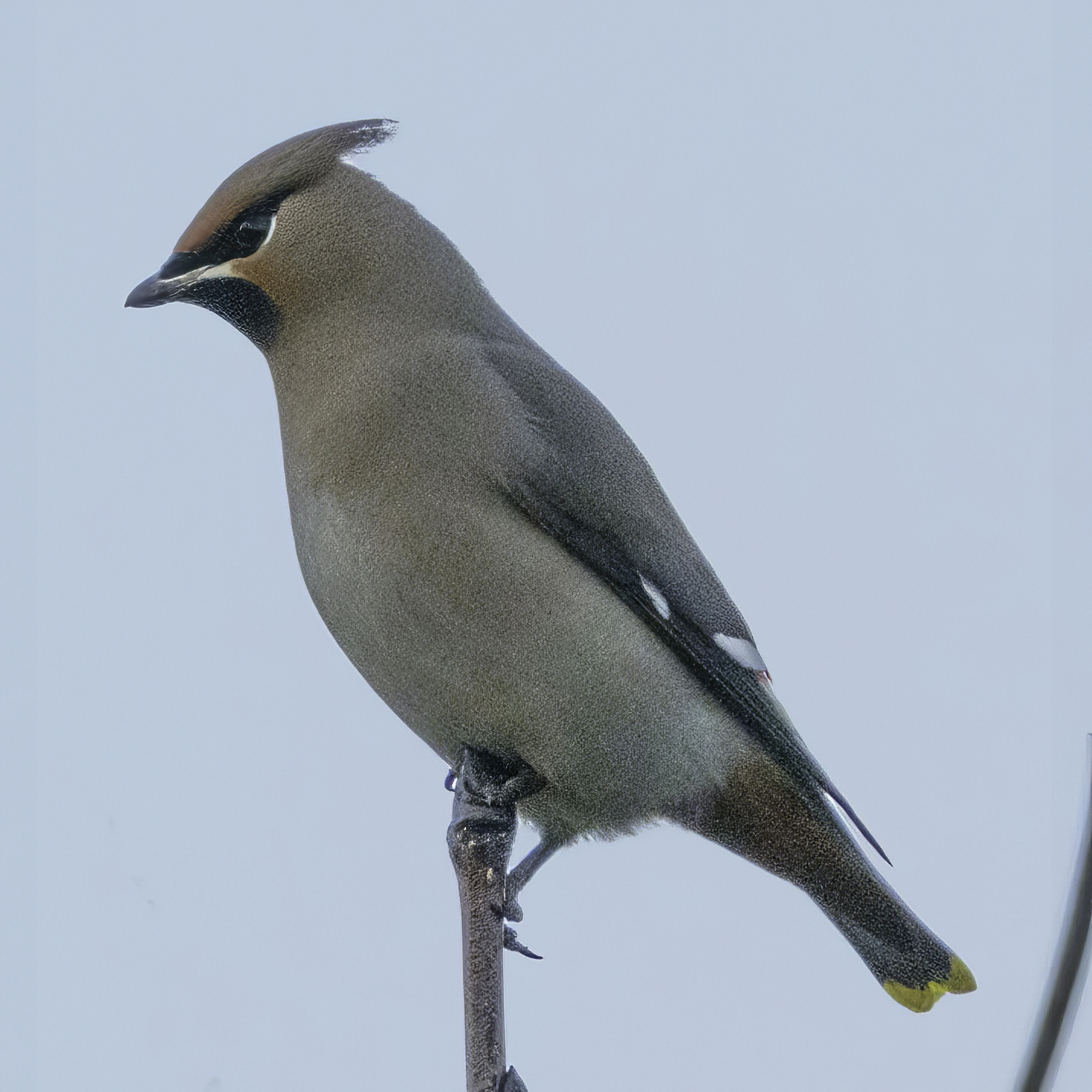
Bohemian waxwing

Order: Passeriformes Family: Bombycillidae

The waxwings are a group of passerine birds with soft silky plumage and unique red tips to some of the wing feathers. In the Bohemian and cedar waxwings, these tips look like sealing wax and give the group its name. These are arboreal birds of northern forests. They live on insects in summer and berries in winter.

- Bohemian waxwing, Bombycilla garrulus (A)

== Accentors ==
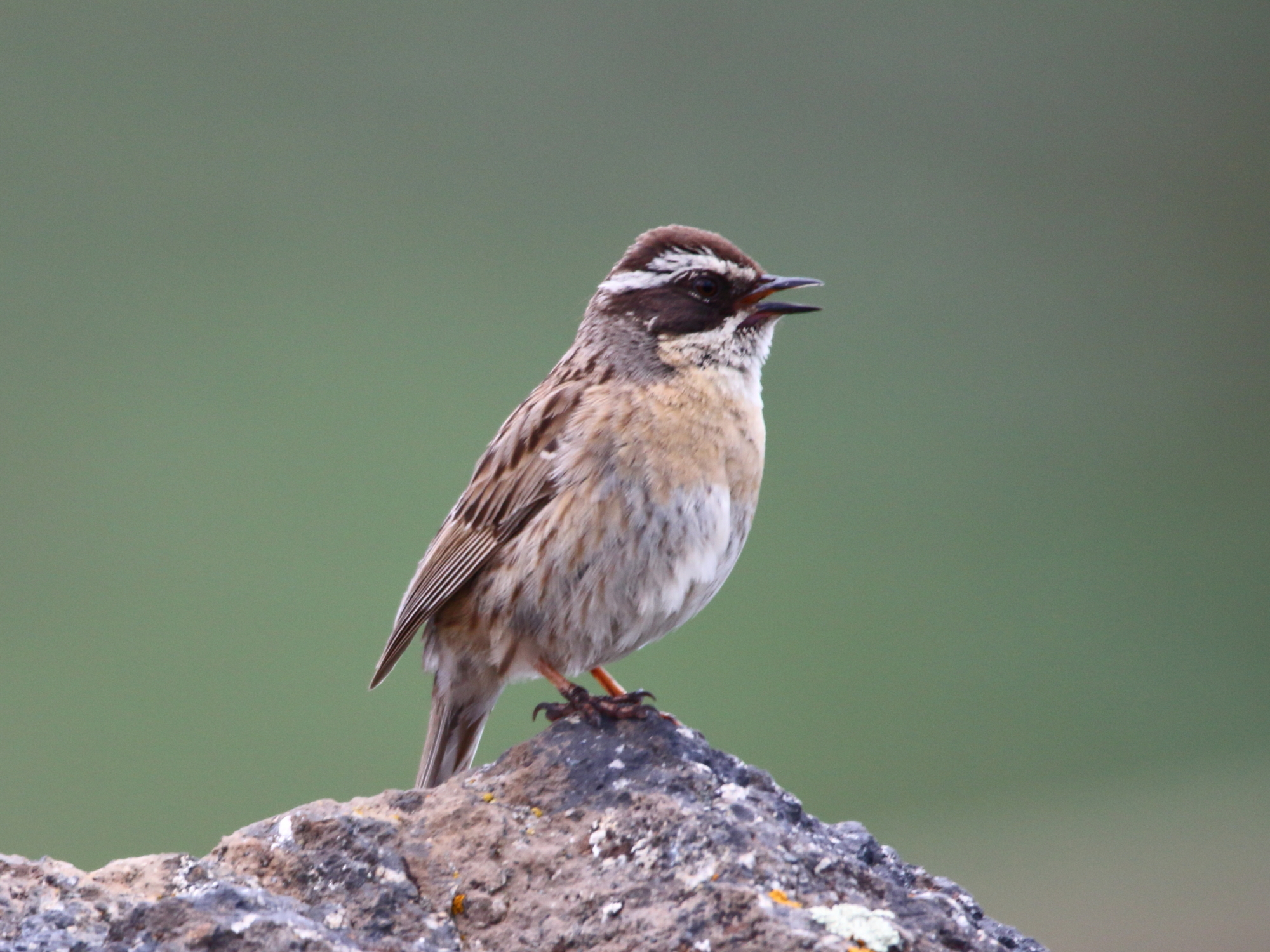
Radde's accentor

Order: Passeriformes Family: Prunellidae

The accentors are in the only bird family, Prunellidae, which is completely endemic to the Palearctic. They are small, fairly drab species superficially similar to sparrows.

- Alpine accentor, Prunella collaris
- Radde's accentor, Prunella ocularis
- Dunnock, Prunella modularis

== Old World sparrows ==
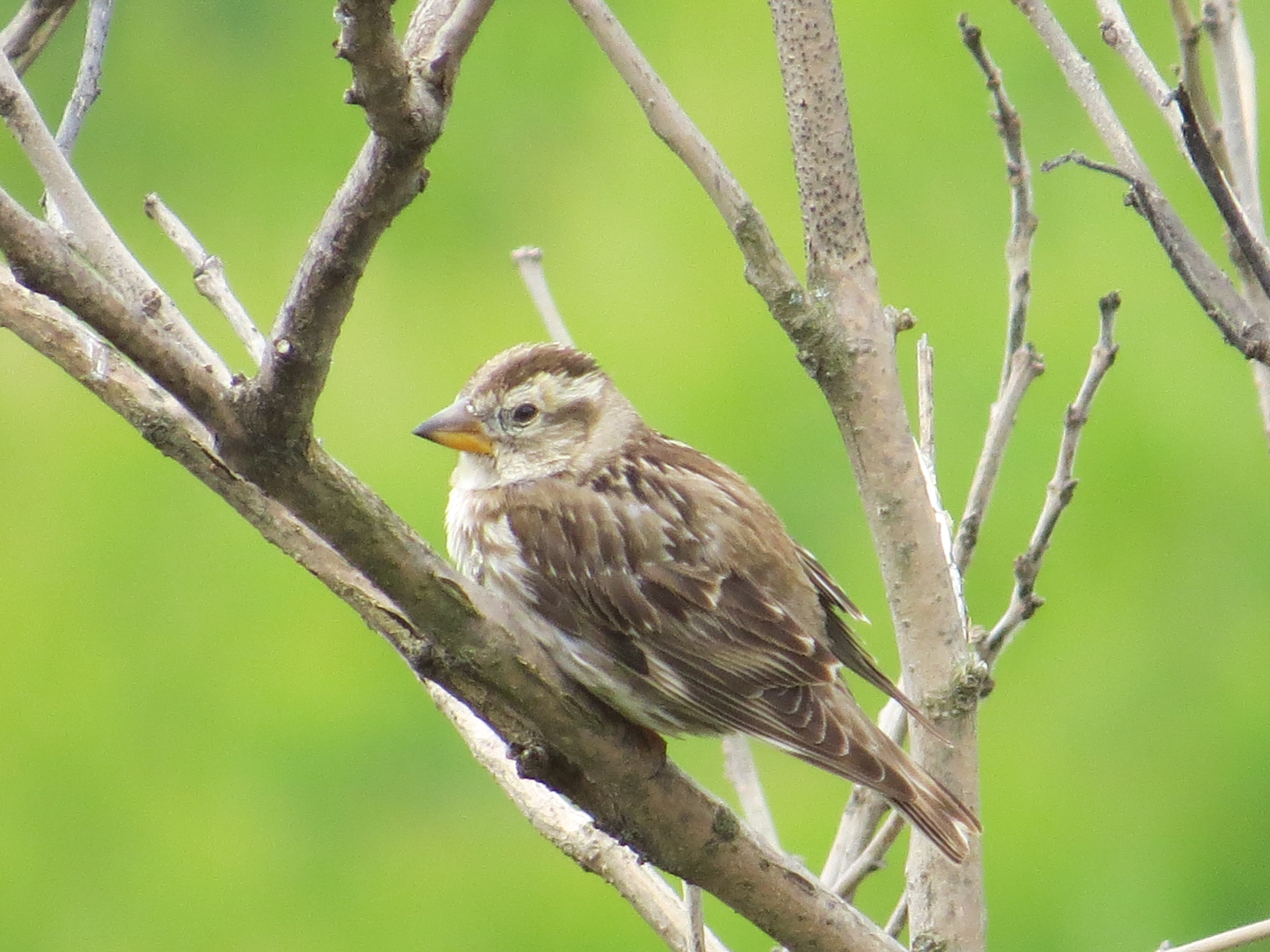
Rock sparrow

Order: Passeriformes Family: Passeridae

Old World sparrows are small passerine birds. In general, sparrows tend to be small, plump, brown or grey birds with short tails and short powerful beaks. Sparrows are seed eaters, but they also consume small insects.

- House sparrow, Passer domesticus
- Spanish sparrow, Passer hispaniolensis
- Eurasian tree sparrow, Passer montanus
- Rock sparrow, Petronia petronia
- Pale rockfinch, Carpospiza brachydactyla
- White-winged snowfinch, Montifringilla nivalis

== Wagtails and pipits ==
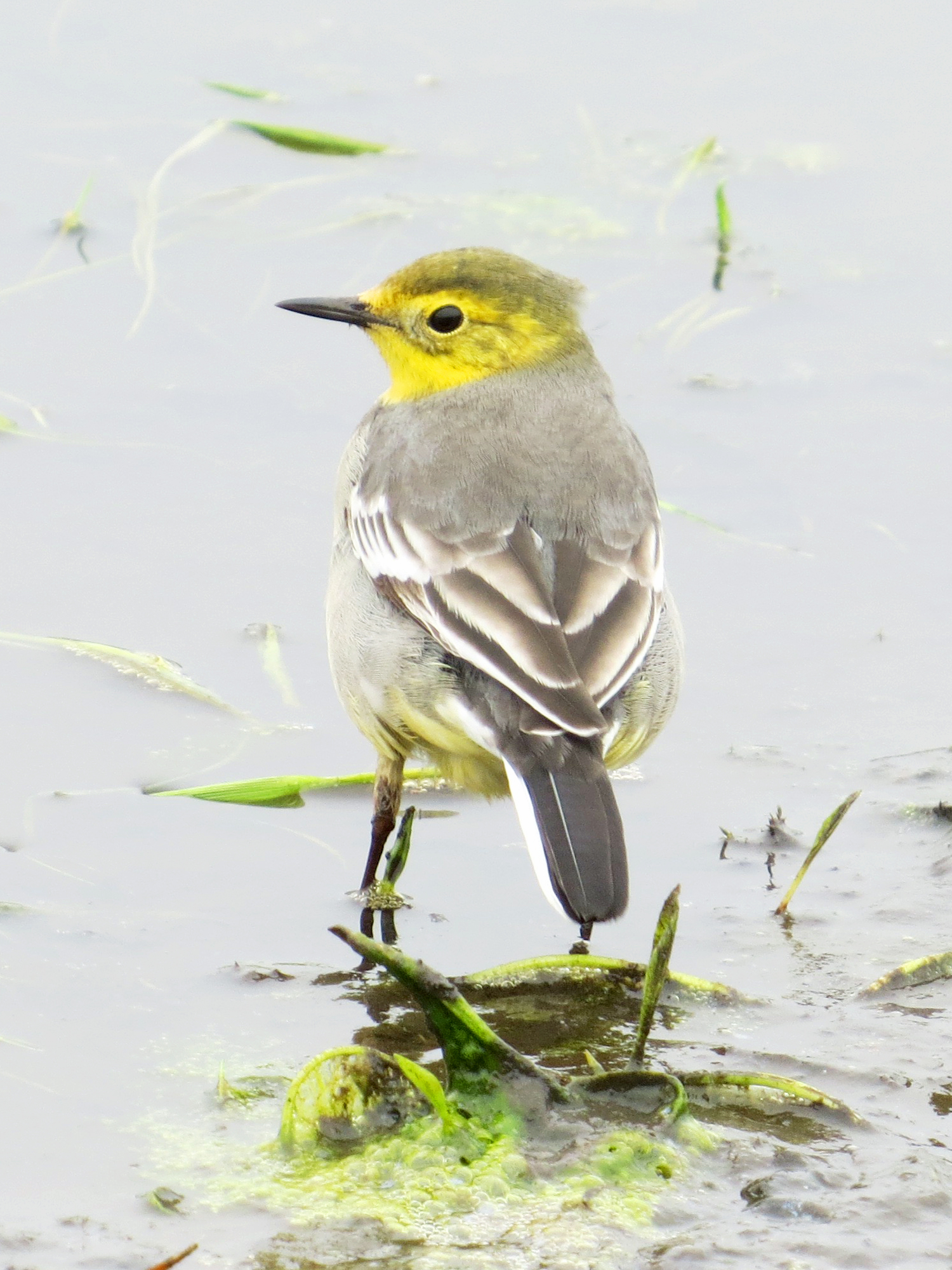
Citrine wagtail

Order: Passeriformes Family: Motacillidae

Motacillidae is a family of small passerine birds with medium to long tails. They include the wagtails, longclaws and pipits. They are slender, ground feeding insectivores of open country.

- Grey wagtail, Motacilla cinerea
- Western yellow wagtail, Motacilla flava
- Citrine wagtail, Motacilla citreola
- White wagtail, Motacilla alba
- Richard's pipit, Anthus richardi (A)
- Tawny pipit, Anthus campestris
- Meadow pipit, Anthus pratensis
- Tree pipit, Anthus trivialis
- Red-throated pipit, Anthus cervinus
- Water pipit, Anthus spinoletta

== Finches and allies ==
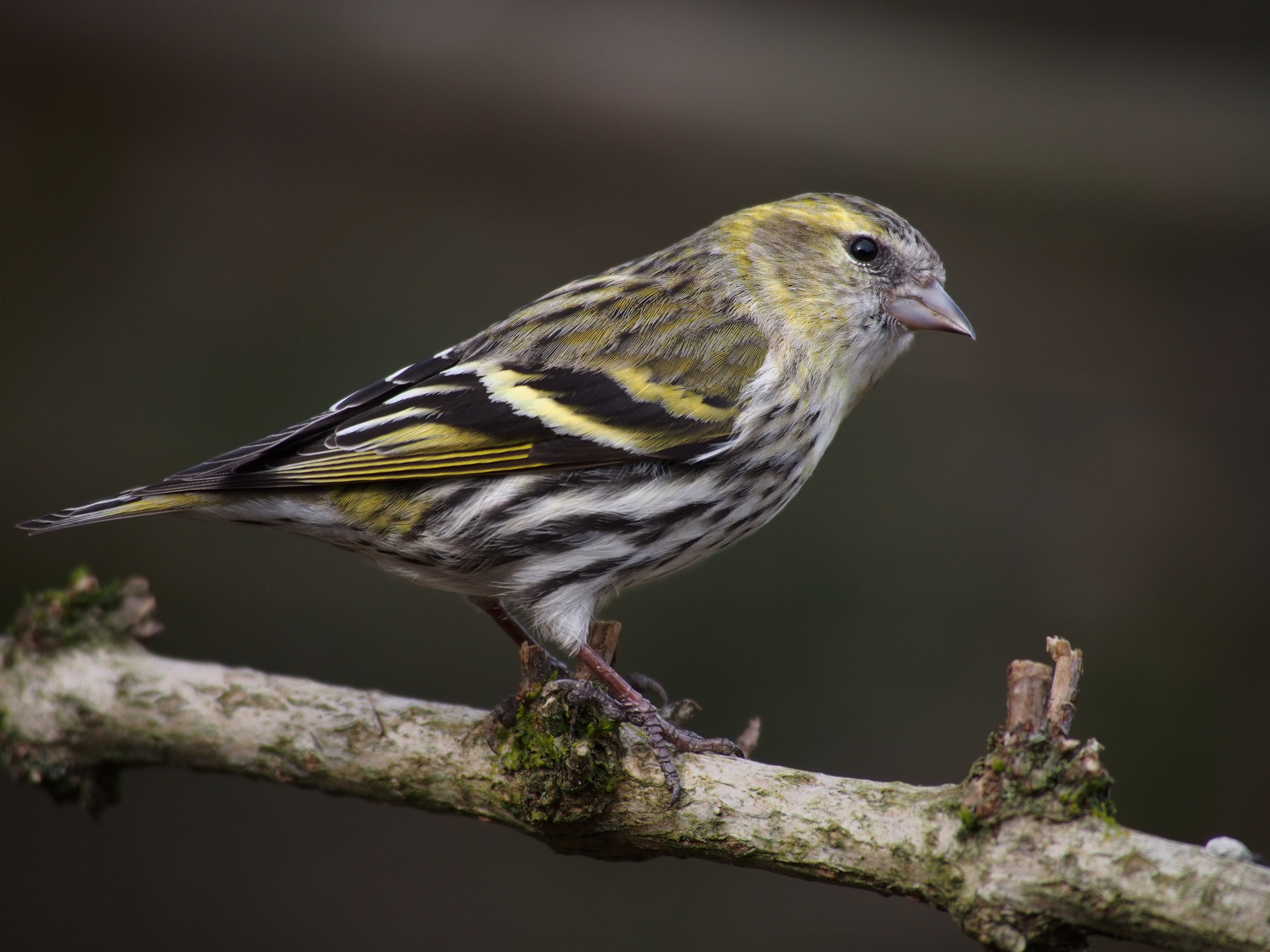
Eurasian siskin

Order: Passeriformes Family: Fringillidae

Finches are seed-eating passerine birds, that are small to moderately large and have a strong beak, usually conical and in some species very large. All have twelve tail feathers and nine primaries. These birds have a bouncing flight with alternating bouts of flapping and gliding on closed wings, and most sing well.

- Eurasian chaffinch, Fringilla coelebs
- Brambling, Fringilla montifringilla
- Hawfinch, Coccothraustes coccothraustes
- Common rosefinch, Carpodacus erythrinus
- Long-tailed rosefinch, Carpodacus sibiricus (A)
- Eurasian bullfinch, Pyrrhula pyrrhula
- Crimson-winged finch, Rhodopechys sanguineus
- Trumpeter finch, Bucanetes githagineus
- Mongolian finch, Bucanetes mongolicus
- Desert finch, Rhodospiza obsoleta (A)
- European greenfinch, Chloris chloris
- Twite, Linaria flavirostris
- Common linnet, Linaria cannabina
- Red crossbill, Loxia curvirostra
- European goldfinch, Carduelis carduelis
- European serin, Serinus serinus (A)
- Red-fronted serin, Serinus pusillus
- Eurasian siskin, Spinus spinus

== Longspurs and arctic buntings ==
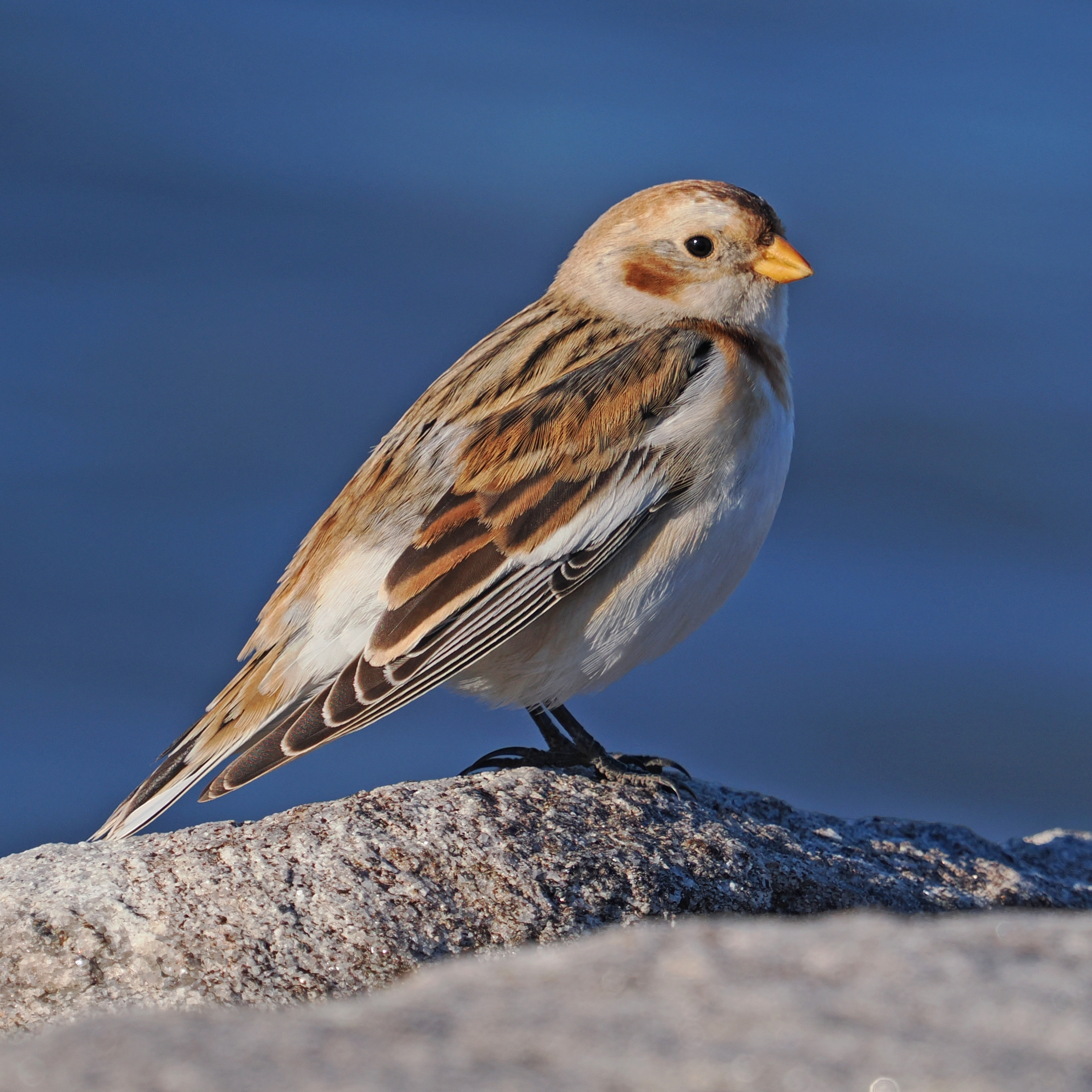
Snow bunting

Order: Passeriformes Family: Calcariidae

The Calcariidae are a family of birds that had been traditionally grouped with the buntings, but differ in a number of respects and are usually found in open grassy areas.

- Snow bunting, Plectrophenax nivalis (A)

== Old World buntings ==
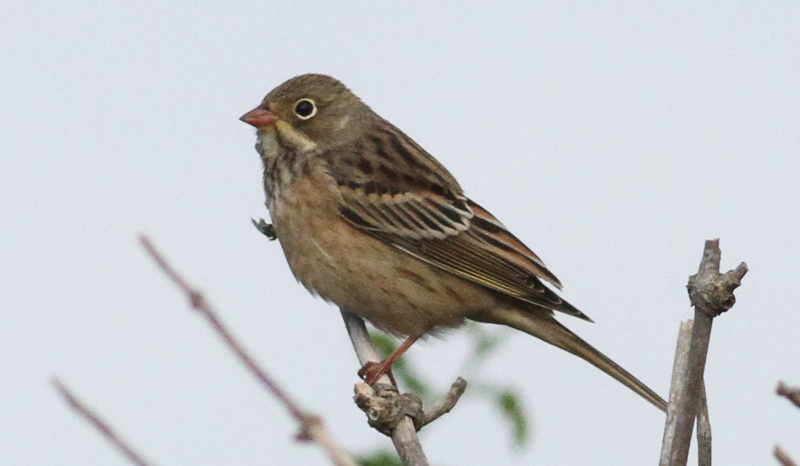
Ortolan bunting

Order: Passeriformes Family: Emberizidae

The buntings are a large family of passerine birds. They are seed-eating birds with distinctively shaped bills. Many buntings have distinctive head patterns.

- Black-headed bunting, Emberiza melanocephala
- Corn bunting, Emberiza calandra
- Rock bunting, Emberiza cia
- Yellowhammer, Emberiza citrinella
- Pine bunting, Emberiza leucocephalos (A)
- Grey-necked bunting, Emberiza buchanani
- Ortolan bunting, Emberiza hortulana
- Reed bunting, Emberiza schoeniclus
- Rustic bunting, Emberiza rustica (A)

== See also ==
- Fauna of Armenia
- List of birds
- Lists of birds by region
- List of birds of Europe
- List of mammals of Armenia
- Wildlife of Armenia
