= Kabudeh =

Kabudeh (Persian: كبوده) may refer to:

- Kabudeh-ye Olya, Kermanshah Province
- Kabudeh-ye Sofla, Kermanshah Province
- Kabudeh, South Khorasan
- Kabudeh, Zirkuh, South Khorasan Province
- Kabudeh-ye Abu ol Vafai
- Kabudeh-ye Dehju
- Kabudeh-ye Hasanabad
