= Wildlife of Armenia =

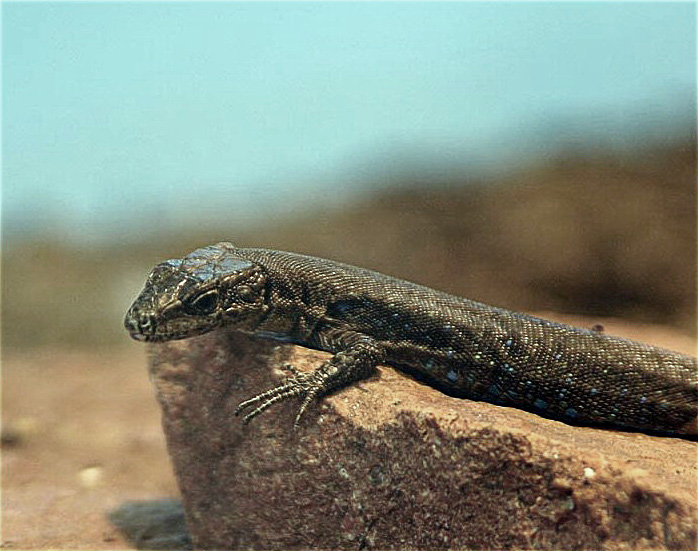
Armenian rock lizard

The wildlife of Armenia includes the wild boar, crested porcupine, various lizards, snakes and numerous species of birds and plants. Endangered species in Armenia are the bear, wild goat, Armenian mouflon and the leopard.

== Fauna ==
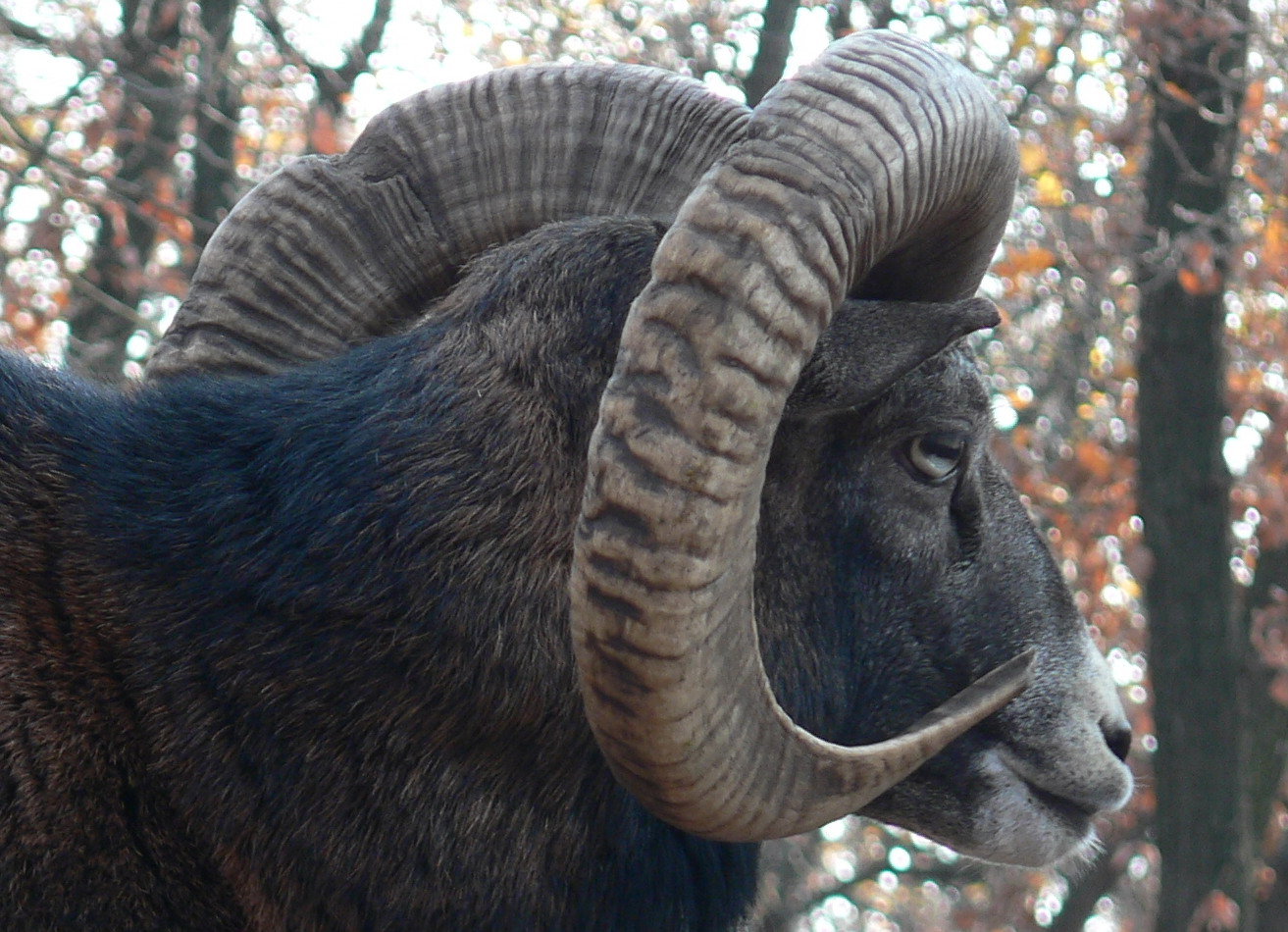
The mouflon, ancestor of domesticated sheep

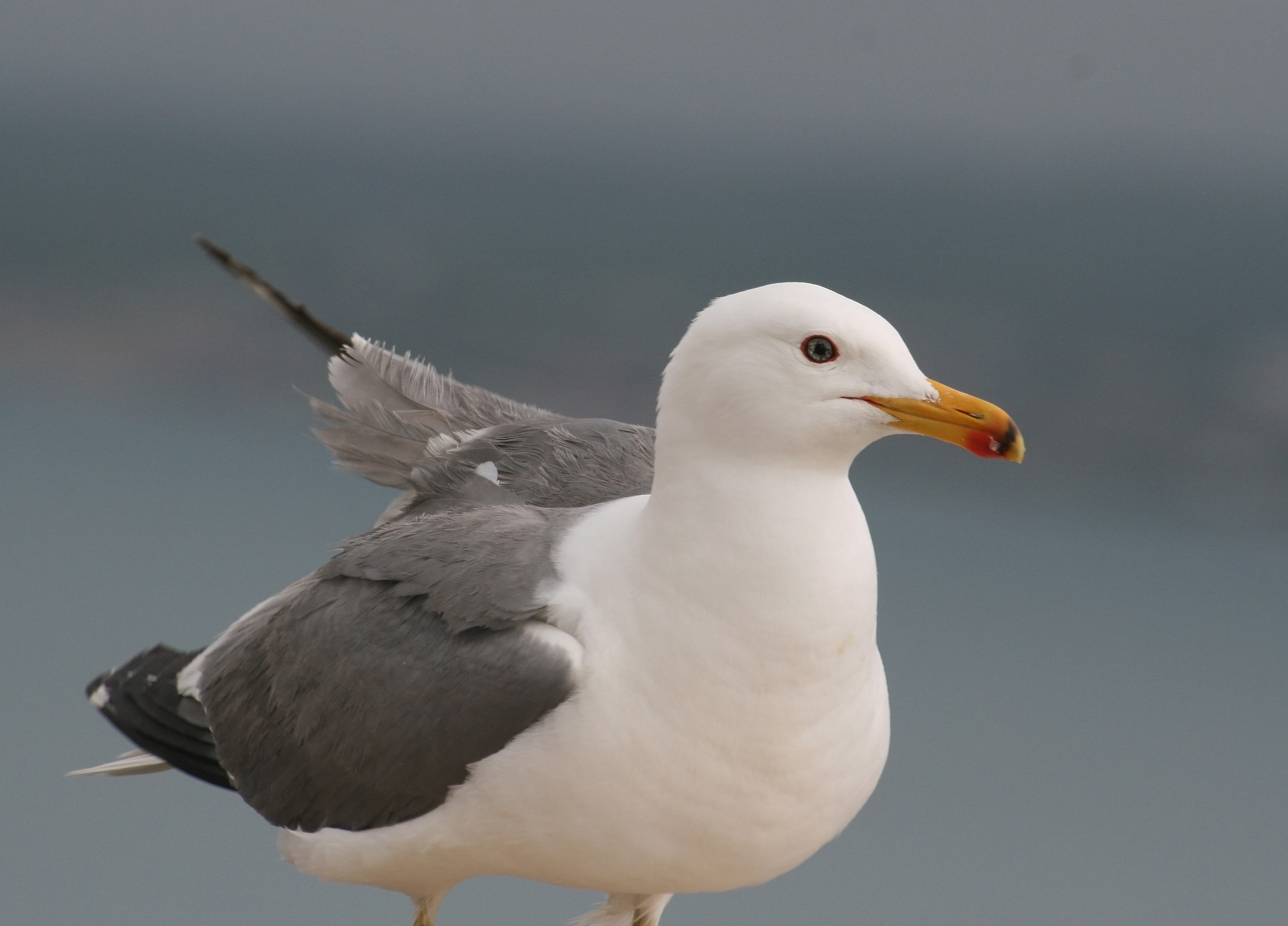
Armenian gull

Fauna in Armenia is diverse given the country's relatively small size, owing to the varied habitats created by the area's mountainous terrain. Armenia is an important area for migratory animals, about 350 different bird species were recorded in the country. Many of the world's domesticated animals originated in or near Armenia, and the mouflon, the ancestor of domesticated sheep, is present there. Research suggests that about a quarter of the animal species in Armenia are internationally endangered. The mouflon is suffering a great population decline due to poaching and habitat loss, and the Sevan trout, which once made up thirty percent of the fish in Lake Sevan, have virtually disappeared.

Southern and south-western Armenia remains the last stronghold of the Persian leopard in the Caucasus, in part due to the region being connected with the leopard population in Iran. The total population in Armenia is thought to number 10 to 20 individuals, including adults, sub-adults and cubs.

=== Common ===
- Armenian gull
- Armenian rock lizard
- Armenian mouflon
- African wildcat
- Brown bear
- Beech marten
- Caucasian bear
- Caucasian squirrel
- Caucasian badger
- Common spoonbill
- Eurasian brown bear
- Eastern imperial eagle
- Eumeces schneiderii
- Eurasian lynx
- Eurasian otter
- European jackal
- European otter
- European wildcat
- Jungle cat
- Greek tortoise
- Golden jackal
- Golden eagle
- Karabakh horse
- Least weasel
- Long-eared hedgehog
- Marbled polecat
- Natterer's bat
- Persian leopard
- Sevan khramulya
- Sevan trout
- Squacco heron
- Steppe wolf
- Steppe eagle
- Striped hyena
- Syrian brown bear
- Montivipera raddei
- Wild goat
- Wild boar
- Vipera darevskii
- Raccoon
- Red deer
- Red fox
- Roe deer

== Flora ==
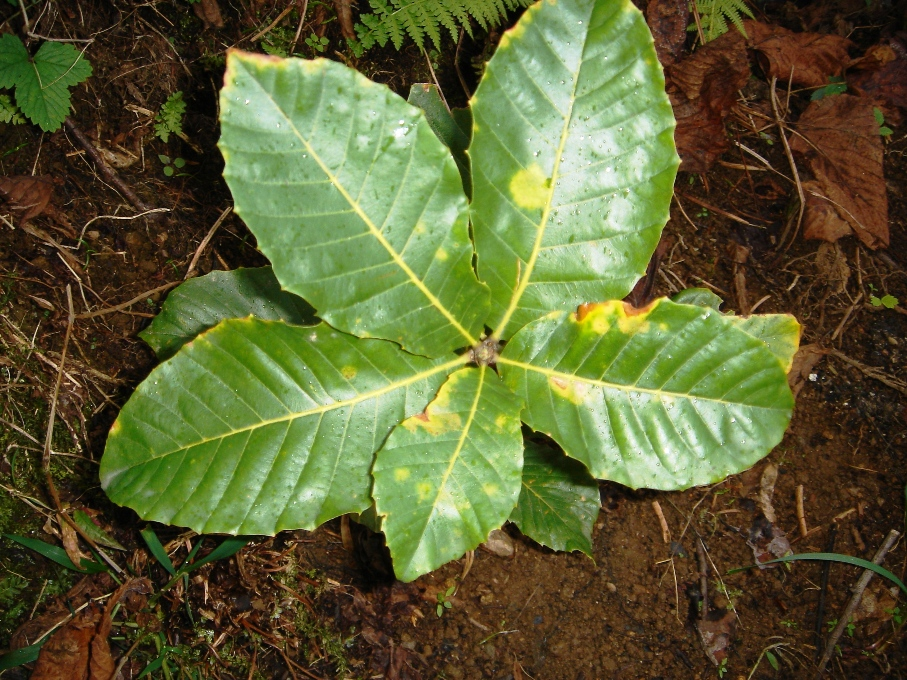
An Armenian oak leaf

In Armenia forest cover is around 12% of the total land area, equivalent to 328,470 hectares (ha) of forest in 2020, down from 334,730 hectares (ha) in 1990. In 2020, naturally regenerating forest covered 310,000 hectares (ha) and planted forest covered 18,470 hectares (ha). Of the naturally regenerating forest 5% was reported to be primary forest (consisting of native tree species with no clearly visible indications of human activity) and around 0% of the forest area was found within protected areas. For the year 2015, 100% of the forest area was reported to be under public ownership.

Some flora found in Armenia includes:

- Acer campestre
- Apricot
- Armenian cucumber
- Downy birch
- Black poplar
- Elaeagnus angustifolia
- Eurasian smoketree
- European pear
- Common fig
- Hackberry
- Sycamore maple
- White mulberry
- Norway maple
- Armenian oak
- Pomegranate
- Populus alba
- Pyrus salicifolia
- Quince
- Sea-buckthorn
- Tatar maple
- Prunus avium
- White willow
- Chaerophyllum macrospermum

== See also ==
- Climate of Armenia
- Fauna of Armenia
- List of birds of Armenia
- List of mammals of Armenia
- List of protected areas of Armenia
