= Kabudan =

Kabudan (Persian: كبودان) may refer to:

- Kabudan Island in Lake Urmia, Iran
- Kabudan, East Azerbaijan
- Kabudan, Kerman
- Kabudan, Khuzestan
- Kabudan, Razavi Khorasan
- Kabudan, South Khorasan
- Kaboodan, in South Khorasan Province
