= Fauna of Armenia =

Native animals of Armenia

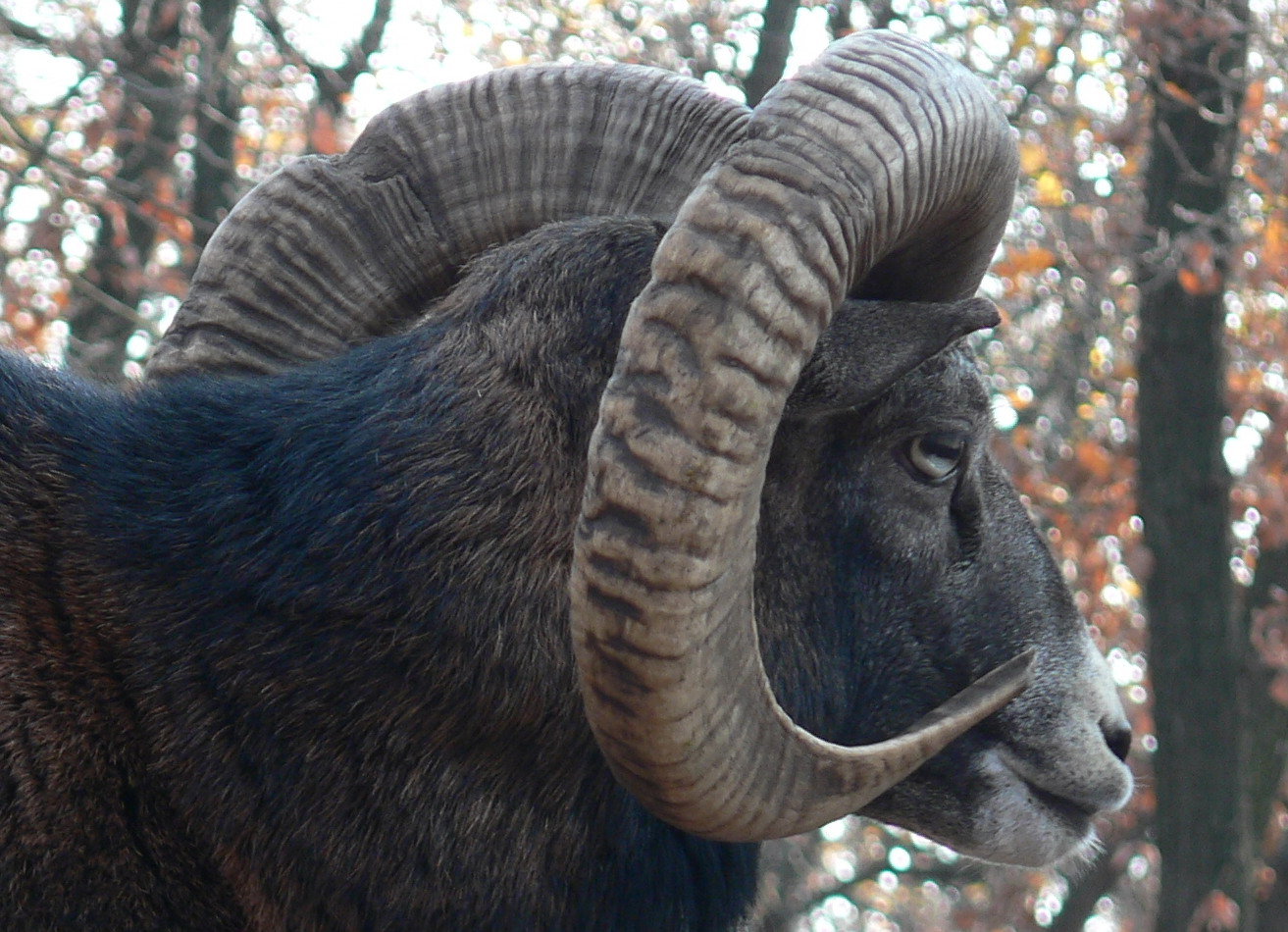
The mouflon, ancestor of domesticated sheep

Fauna in Armenia is diverse given the country's relatively small geographic size, owing to the varied habitats created by the area's mountainous terrain. Armenia is an important area for migratory animals; about 350 different bird species were recorded in the country. Many of the world's domesticated animals originated in the area Armenia is located in, and the mouflon, the ancestor of domesticated sheep, is present there. Research suggests that about a quarter of the animal species in Armenia are internationally endangered. The mouflons are suffering a great population decline due to poaching and habitat loss, and the Sevan trout, which made up thirty percent of the fish in Lake Sevan, have virtually disappeared.

== Felidae ==
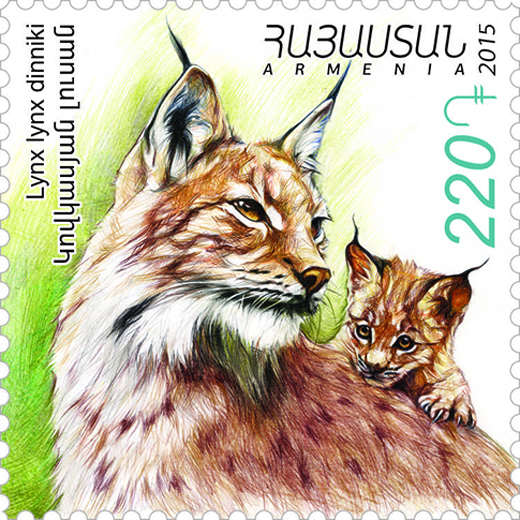
Caucasian Lynx stamp of Armenia

Southern and south-western Armenia remain the last stronghold for survival of the Persian leopard in the whole Caucasus, in part due to its connectivity with Iran, where the main portion of the Persian leopard population exists. The total population size in Armenia numbers no more than 10-20 individuals, including adults, sub adults and cubs. Special calculations were not carried out. By fragmentary data, the population in Armenia is accounted not more than 25 individuals.

Before being hunted to extinction in the Trans-Caucasus in the 10th century, the Asiatic lion used to occur in the region of Yerevan and the Araks River.

=== Common animals ===
- Armenian gull
- Armenian rock lizard
- Armenian mouflon
- Armenian Gampr
- Armenian Semicoarsewool
- African wildcat
- Brown bear
- Black stork
- Bearded vulture
- Beech marten
- Cinereous vulture
- Caucasian bear
- Caucasian grouse
- Caucasian squirrel
- Caucasian Shepherd Dog
- Caucasian badger
- Common spoonbill
- Eurasian brown bear
- Eastern imperial eagle
- Eumeces schneiderii
- Eremias pleskei
- Eurasian lynx
- Eurasian otter
- Eurasian griffon vulture
- European jackal
- European otter
- European wildcat
- Egyptian vulture
- Jungle cat
- Trumpeter finch
- Greek tortoise
- Golden jackal
- Golden eagle
- Karabakh horse
- Least weasel
- Long-eared hedgehog
- Little bustard
- Marbled polecat
- Natterer's bat
- Persian leopard
- Sevan khramulya
- Sevan trout
- Squacco heron
- Steppe wolf
- Steppe eagle
- Striped hyena
- Syrian brown bear
- Montivipera raddei
- Woodchat shrike
- White-tailed eagle
- White stork
- Wild goat
- Wild boar
- Vipera darevskii
- Raccoon
- Red deer
- Red fox
- Roe deer
- Levant sparrowhawk
- Peregrine falcon
- Phrynocephalus persicus
- Pelobates syriacus
- Marsh frog
- European green toad

== Reserves ==
Several reserves have been established in Armenia to preserve the fauna, flora and their ecosystems:

- Khosrov Forest State Reserve
- Shikahogh State Reserve
- Erebuni State Reserve

== See also ==
- Climate of Armenia
- Geography of Armenia
- List of birds of Armenia
- List of mammals of Armenia
- Wildlife of Armenia
