= List of mammals of Armenia =

There are sixty-two mammal species in Armenia. This list is derived from the IUCN Red List which lists species of mammals and includes those mammals that have been classified as recently extinct (since 1500 AD).

Icons which state each species' global IUCN status:
| CR | Critically Endangered | In imminent risk of extinction in the wild |
| EN | Endangered | Facing an extremely high risk of extinction in the wild |
| VU | Vulnerable | Facing a high risk of extinction in the wild |
| NT | Near Threatened | Doesn't meet any criteria that would categorise it as risking extinction but likely to in the future |
| LC | Least Concern | No current identifiable risks to this species |
| DD | Data Deficient | Inadequate information to make an assessment of the risks to this species |

== Order: Artiodactyla (even-toed ungulates) ==
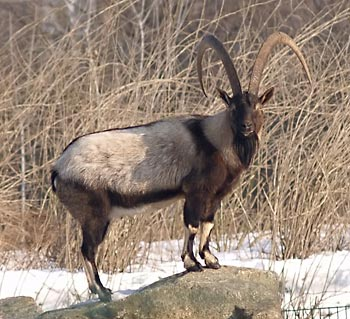
Wild goat

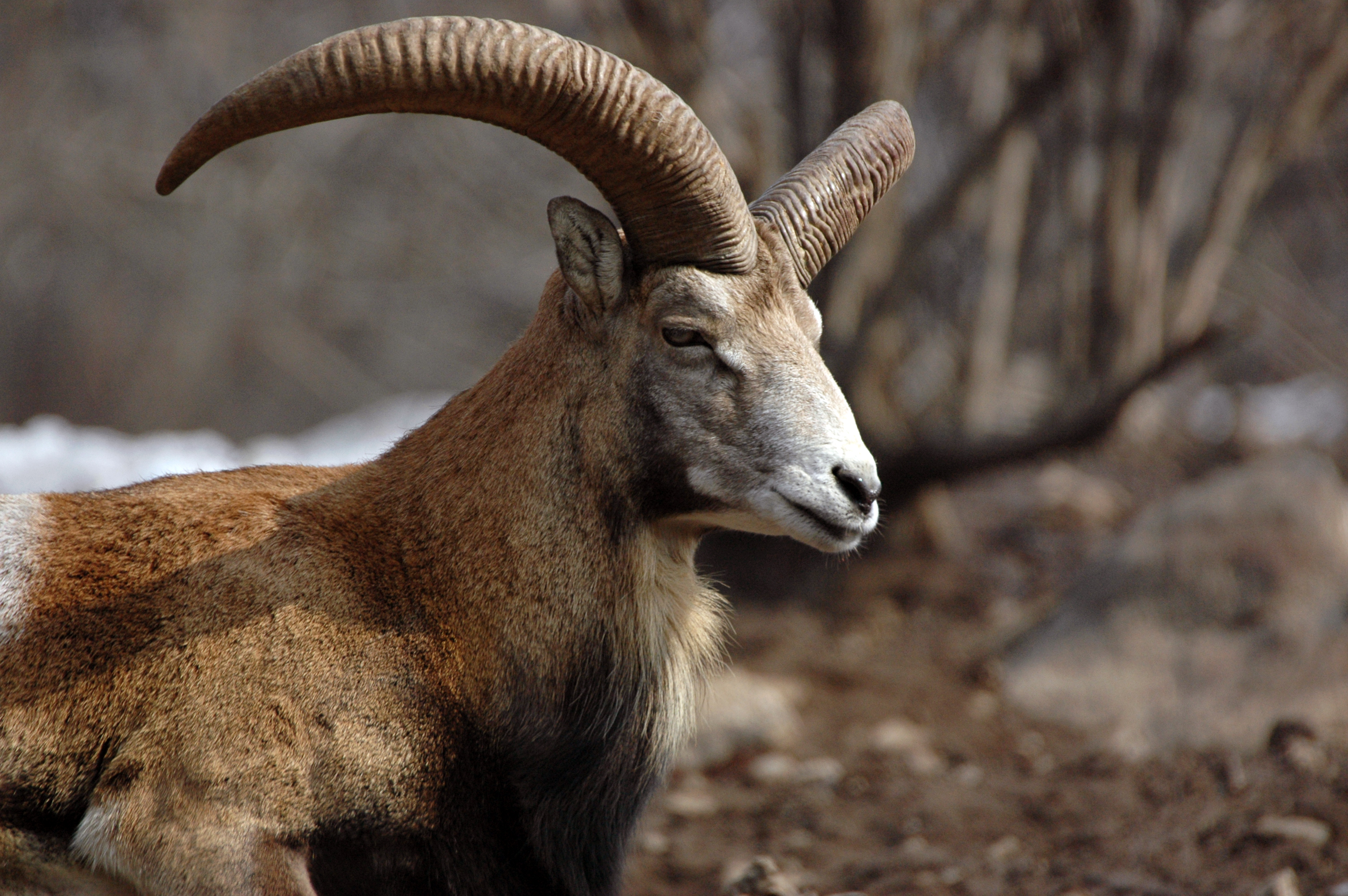
Armenian mouflon

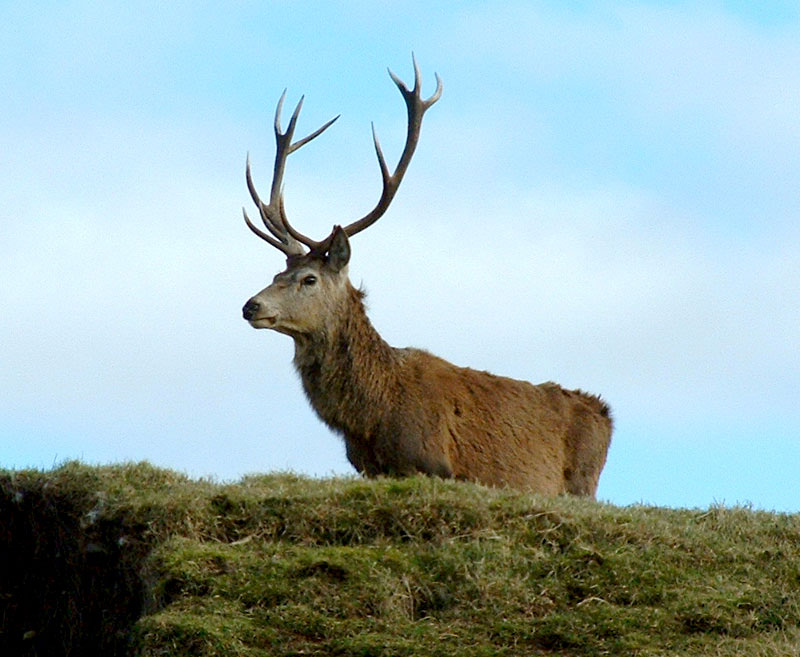
Red deer

The even-toed ungulates are ungulates whose weight is borne about equally by the third and fourth toes, rather than mostly or entirely by the third as in perissodactyls. There are about 220 artiodactyl species, including many that are of great economic importance to humans.

- Family: Bovidae (cattle, antelope, sheep, goats)
  - Subfamily: Caprinae
    - Genus: Capra
      - Wild goat, C. aegagrus NT
    - Genus: Ovis
      - Mouflon, O. gmelini NT
        - Armenian mouflon, O. g. gmelini
    - Genus: Rupicapra
      - Chamois, R. rupicapra LC
- Family: Cervidae (deer)
  - Subfamily: Cervinae
    - Genus: Axis
      - Chital, A. axis LC introduced
    - Genus: Cervus
      - Red deer, C. elaphus LC
      - Sika deer, C. nippon LC introduced
  - Subfamily: Capreolinae
    - Genus: Capreolus
      - Roe deer, C. capreolus LC
- Family: Suidae (pigs)
  - Subfamily: Suinae
    - Genus: Sus
      - Wild boar, S. scrofa LC

== Order: Carnivora (carnivorans) ==
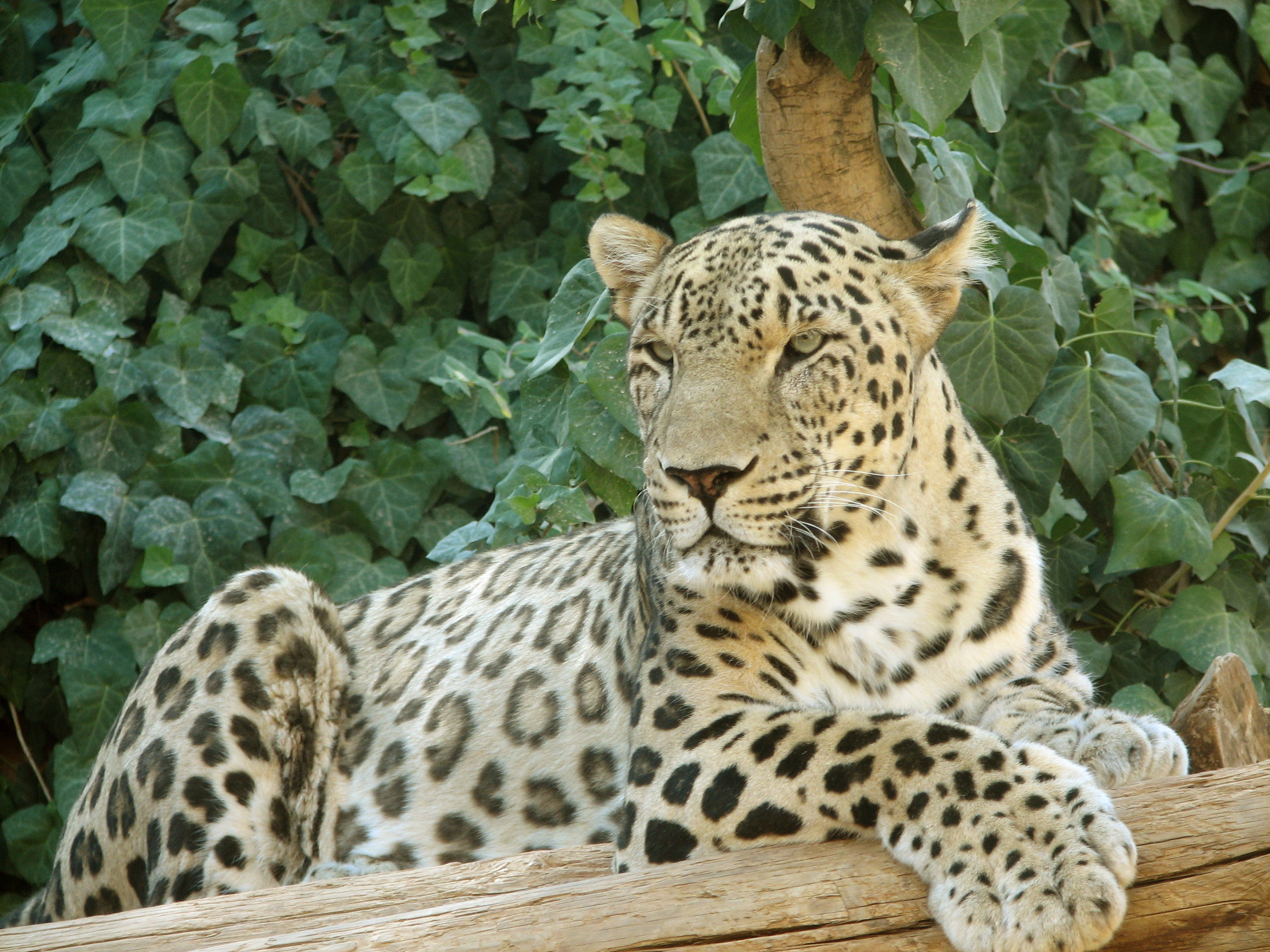
Persian leopard

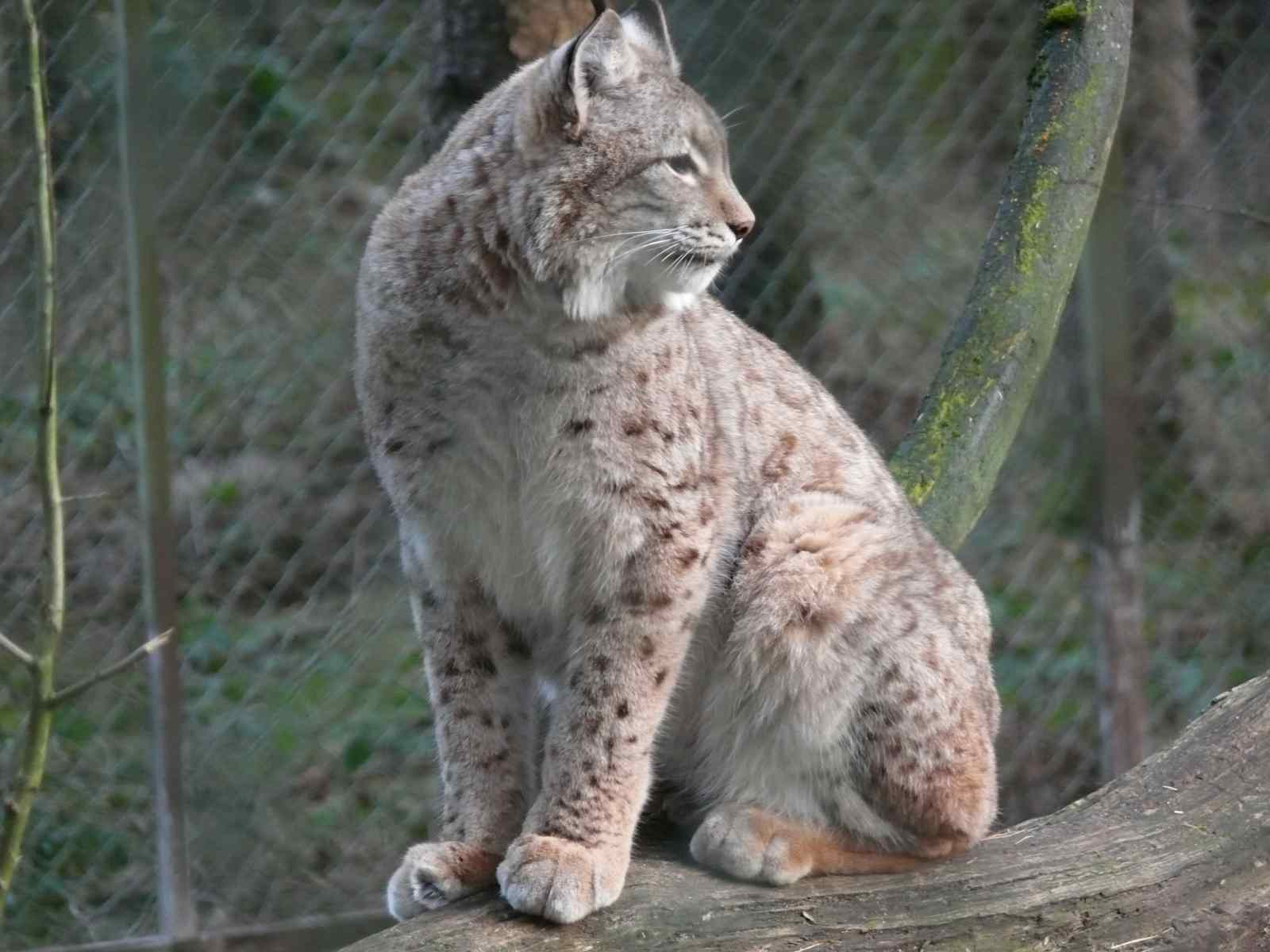
Eurasian lynx

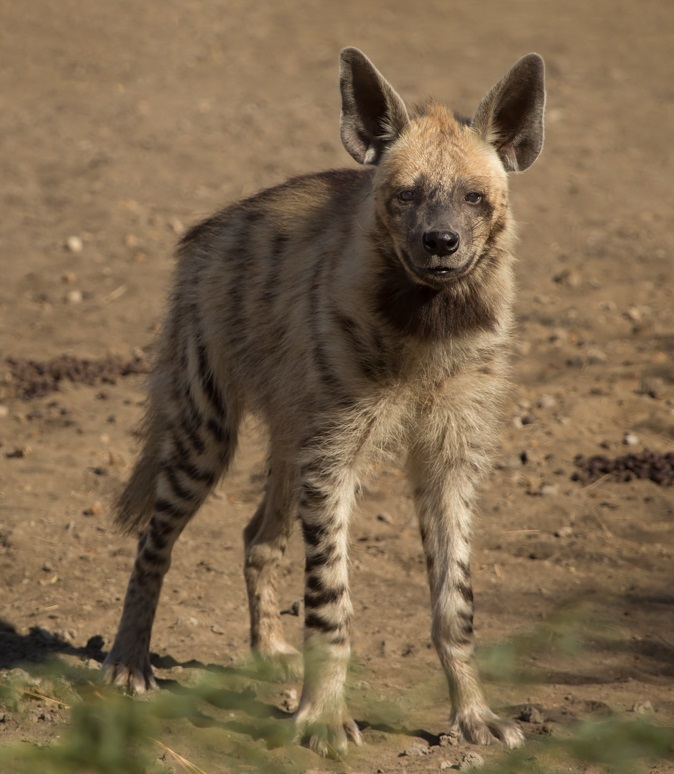
Striped hyena

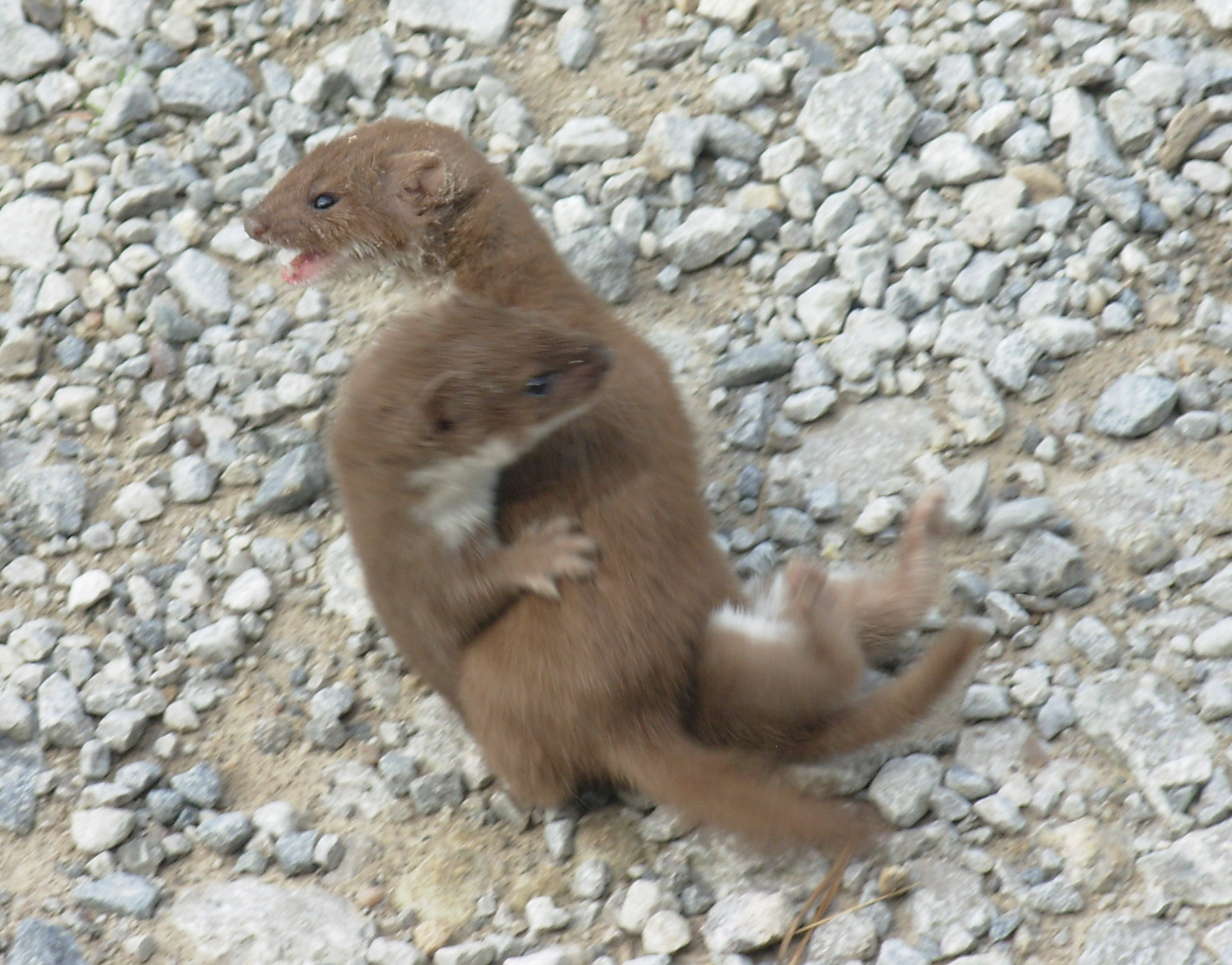
Least weasel

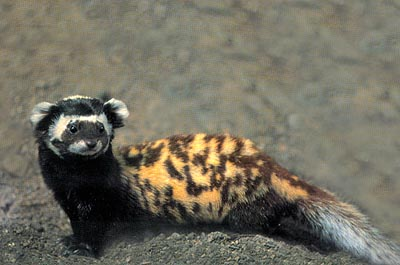
Marbled polecat

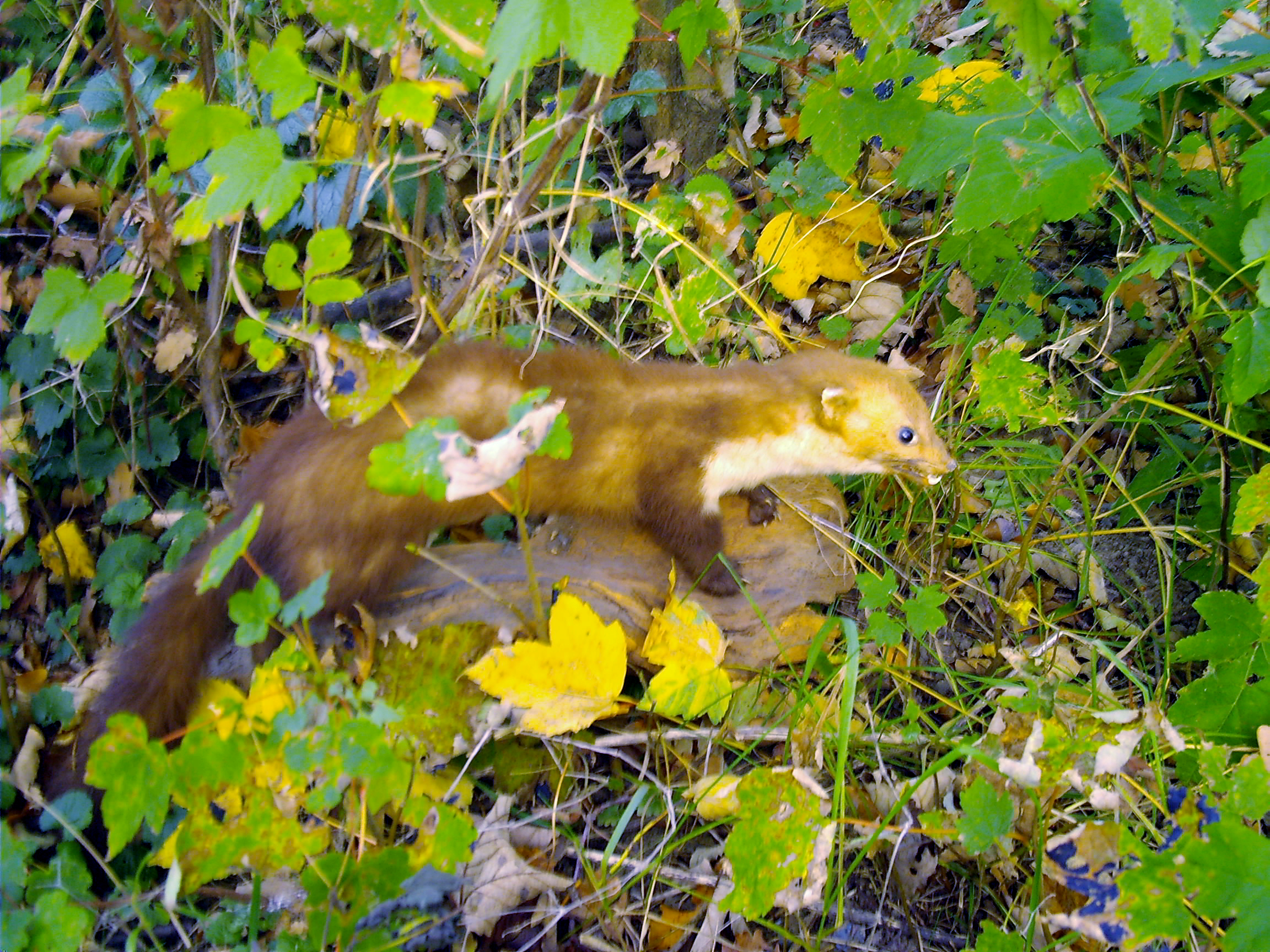
Beech marten

There are over 260 species of carnivorans, the majority of which feed primarily on meat. They have a characteristic skull shape and dentition.

- Suborder: Feliformia
  - Family: Felidae (cats)
    - Subfamily: Felinae
      - Genus: Felis
        - Jungle cat, F. chaus LC
        - African wildcat, F. lybica LC
      - Genus: Lynx
        - Eurasian lynx, L. lynx LC
          - Caucasian lynx, L. l. dinniki
      - Genus: Otocolobus
        - Pallas's cat, O. manul LC possibly extirpated
    - Subfamily: Pantherinae
      - Genus: Panthera
        - Leopard, P. pardus VU
          - Persian leopard, P. p. tulliana EN
  - Family: Hyaenidae (hyaenas)
    - Genus: Hyaena
      - Striped hyena, H. hyaena NT
- Suborder: Caniformia
  - Family: Canidae (dogs, foxes)
    - Genus: Canis
      - Golden jackal, C. aureus LC
        - European jackal, C. a. moreoticus
      - Gray wolf, C. lupus LC
        - Steppe wolf, C. l. campestris
    - Genus: Vulpes
      - Red fox, V. vulpes LC
  - Family: Ursidae (bears)
    - Genus: Ursus
      - Brown bear, U. arctos LC
        - Eurasian brown bear, U. a. arctos
  - Family: Mustelidae (mustelids)
    - Genus: Lutra
      - Eurasian otter, L. lutra NT
    - Genus: Martes
      - Beech marten, M. foina LC
      - European pine marten, M. martes LC
    - Genus: Meles
      - Caucasian badger, M. canescens NE
    - Genus: Mustela
      - Least weasel, M. nivalis LC
    - Genus: Vormela
      - Marbled polecat, V. peregusna VU

== Order: Chiroptera (bats) ==
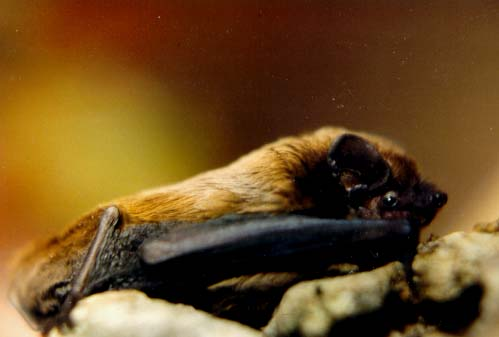
Lesser noctule

The bats' most distinguishing feature is that their forelimbs are developed as wings, making them the only mammals capable of flight. Bat species account for about 20% of all mammals.

- Family: Vespertilionidae
  - Subfamily: Myotinae
    - Genus: Myotis
      - Geoffroy's bat, M. emarginatus LC
      - Whiskered bat, M. mystacinus LC
      - Natterer's bat, M. nattereri LC
      - Schaub's myotis, M. schaubi DD
  - Subfamily: Vespertilioninae
    - Genus: Barbastella
      - Western barbastelle, B. barbastellus NT
    - Genus: Nyctalus
      - Greater noctule bat, N. lasiopterus VU
      - Lesser noctule, N. leisleri LC
  - Subfamily: Miniopterinae
    - Genus: Miniopterus
      - Common bent-wing bat, M. schreibersii VU
- Family: Rhinolophidae
  - Subfamily: Rhinolophinae
    - Genus: Rhinolophus
      - Blasius's horseshoe bat, R. blasii LC
      - Mediterranean horseshoe bat, R. euryale NT
      - Greater horseshoe bat, R. ferrumequinum LC
      - Lesser horseshoe bat, R. hipposideros LC
      - Mehely's horseshoe bat, R. mehelyi VU

== Order: Eulipotyphla (hedgehogs, shrews and moles) ==
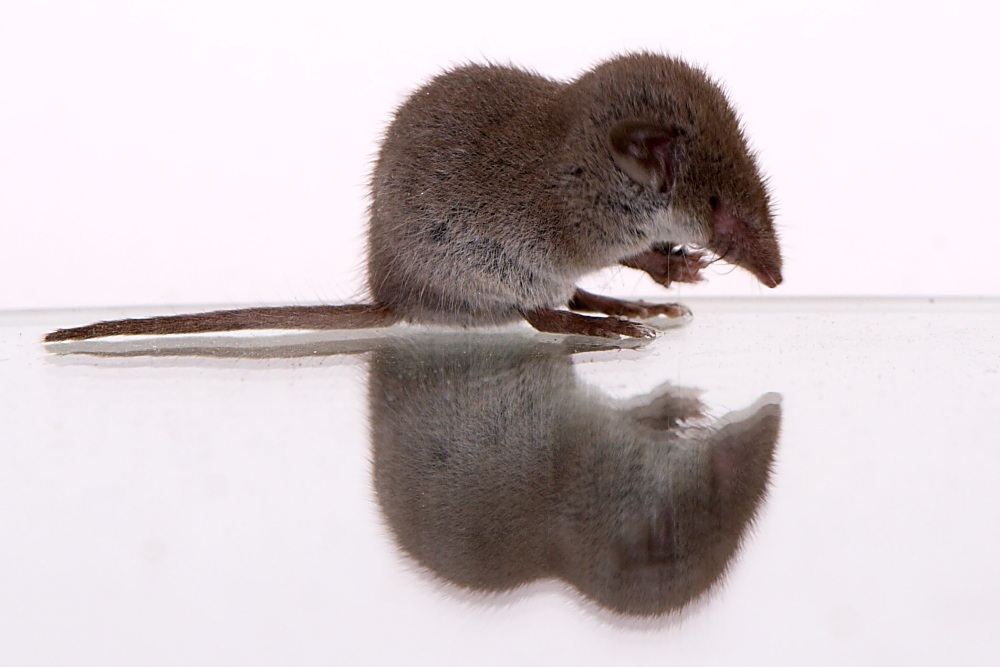
Lesser white-toothed shrew

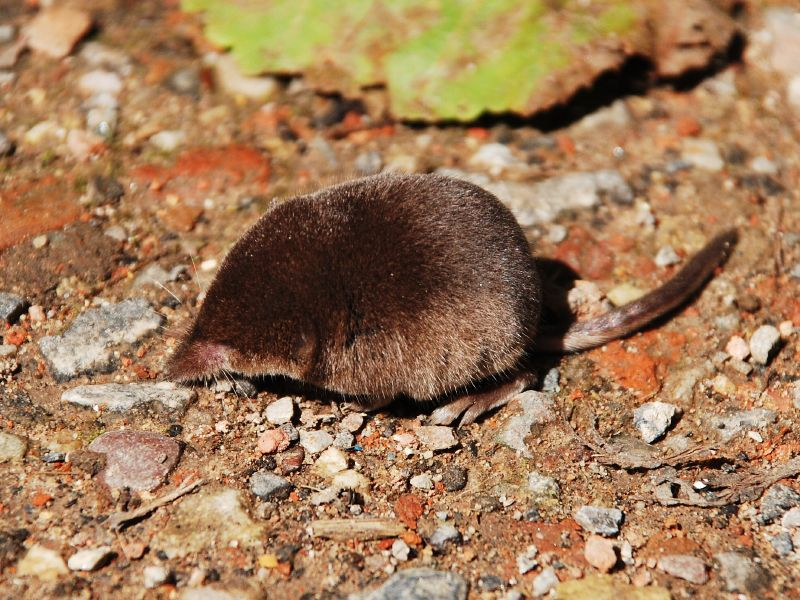
Eurasian pygmy shrew

Hedgehogs are easily recognised by their spines, shrews closely resemble mice, and moles are stout-bodied burrowers.

- Family: Erinaceidae (hedgehogs)
  - Subfamily: Erinaceinae
    - Genus: Erinaceus
      - Southern white-breasted hedgehog, E. concolor LC
- Family: Soricidae (shrews)
  - Subfamily: Crocidurinae
    - Genus: Crocidura
      - Armenian shrew, C. armenica DD
      - Gueldenstaedt's shrew, C. gueldenstaedtii LC
      - Bicolored shrew, C. leucodon LC
      - Lesser white-toothed shrew, C. suaveolens LC
  - Subfamily: Soricinae
    - Tribe: Nectogalini
      - Genus: Neomys
        - Transcaucasian water shrew, N. teres LC
    - Tribe: Soricini
      - Genus: Sorex
        - Eurasian pygmy shrew, S. minutus LC
        - Radde's shrew, S. raddei LC
        - Caucasian pygmy shrew, S. volnuchini LC

== Order: Lagomorpha (lagomorphs) ==
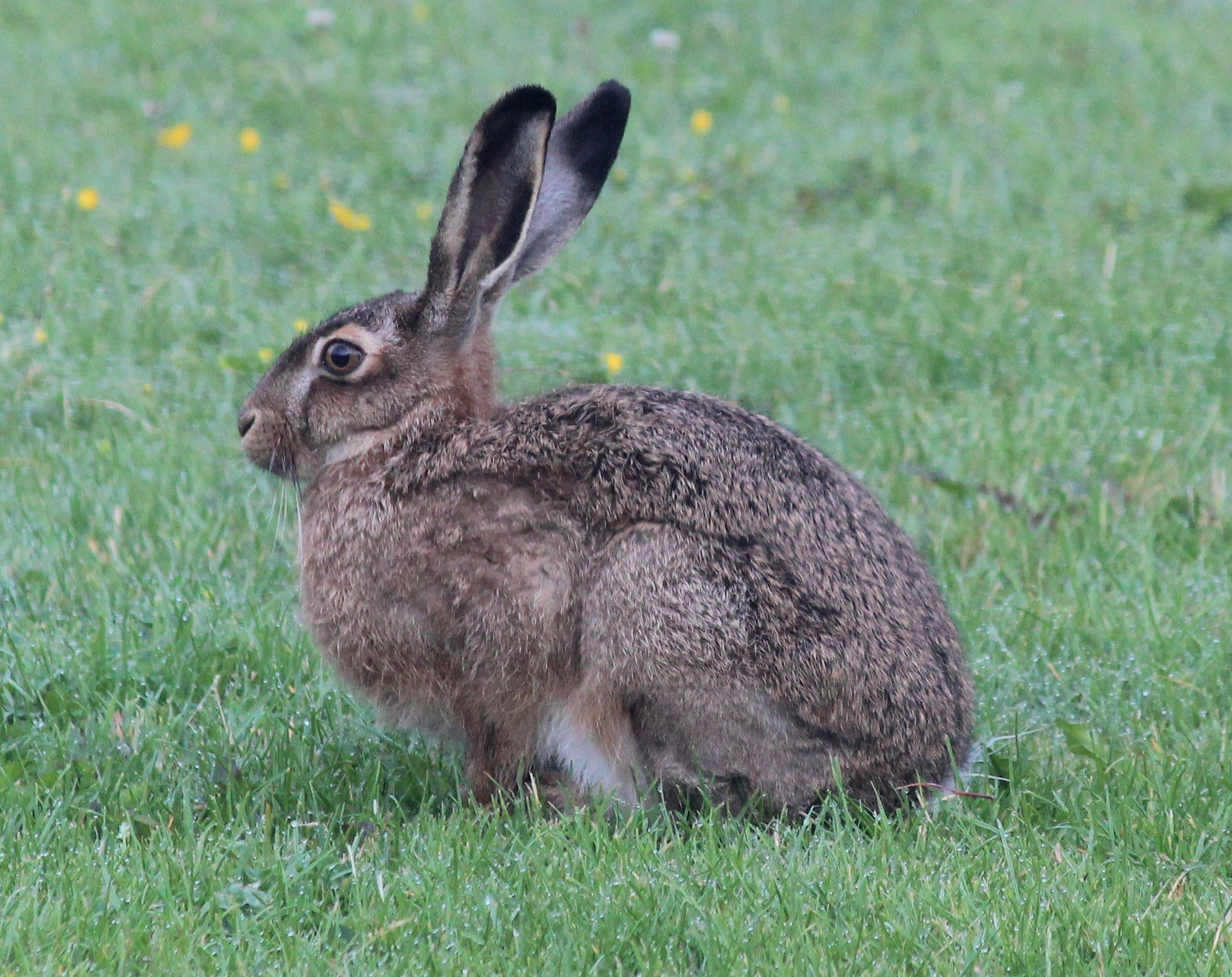
European hare

The lagomorphs comprise two families, Leporidae (hares and rabbits), and Ochotonidae (pikas). Though they can resemble rodents, and were classified as a superfamily in that order until the early 20th century, they have since been considered a separate order. They differ from rodents in a number of physical characteristics, such as having four incisors in the upper jaw rather than two.

- Family: Leporidae
  - Genus: Lepus
    - European hare, L. europaeus LC

== Order: Rodentia (rodents) ==
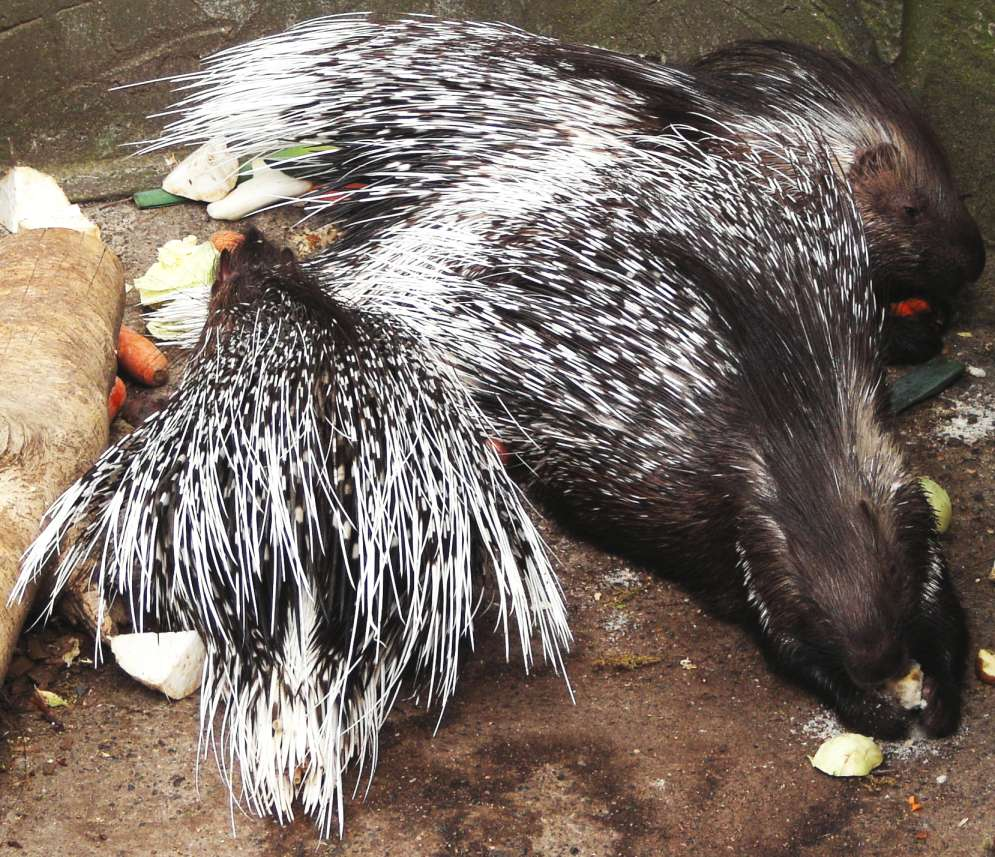
Indian crested porcupine

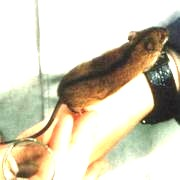
Striped field mouse

Rodents make up the largest order of mammals, with over 40% of mammalian species. They have two incisors in the upper and lower jaw which grow continually and must be kept short by gnawing. Most rodents are small though the capybara can weigh up to 45 kg (100 lb).

- Suborder: Hystricomorpha
  - Family: Hystricidae (Old World porcupines)
    - Genus: Hystrix
      - Indian crested porcupine, H. indica LC
- Suborder: Sciurognathi
  - Family: Sciuridae (squirrels)
    - Subfamily: Sciurinae
      - Tribe: Sciurini
        - Genus: Sciurus
          - Caucasian squirrel, S. anomalus LC
    - Subfamily: Xerinae
      - Tribe: Marmotini
        - Genus: Marmota
          - Long-tailed marmot, M. caudata LC
        - Genus: Spermophilus
          - Asia Minor ground squirrel, Spermophilus xanthoprymnus NT
  - Family: Gliridae (dormice)
    - Subfamily: Glirinae
      - Genus: Glis
        - European edible dormouse, Glis glis LC
      - Genus: Dryomys
        - Forest dormouse, Dryomys nitedula LC
      - Genus: Eliomys
        - Garden dormouse, Eliomys quercinus NT
  - Family: Dipodidae (jerboas)
    - Subfamily: Allactaginae
      - Genus: Allactaga
        - Small five-toed jerboa, Allactaga elater LC
    - Subfamily: Sicistinae
      - Genus: Sicista
        - Armenian birch mouse, S. armenica CR
  - Family: Spalacidae
    - Subfamily: Spalacinae
      - Genus: Nannospalax
        - Nehring's blind mole-rat, Nannospalax nehringi LC
  - Family: Cricetidae
    - Subfamily: Cricetinae
      - Genus: Mesocricetus
        - Turkish hamster, Mesocricetus brandti NT
    - Subfamily: Arvicolinae
      - Genus: Chionomys
        - Snow vole, Chionomys nivalis LC
      - Genus: Ellobius
        - Transcaucasian mole vole, Ellobius lutescens LC
      - Genus: Microtus
        - Altai vole, Microtus obscurus LC
  - Family: Muridae (mice, rats, voles, gerbils, hamsters, etc.)
    - Subfamily: Gerbillinae
      - Genus: Meriones
        - Dahl's jird, Meriones dahli CR
        - Persian jird, Meriones persicus LC
        - Tristram's jird, Meriones tristrami LC
        - Vinogradov's jird, Meriones vinogradovi LC
    - Subfamily: Murinae
      - Genus: Apodemus
        - Striped field mouse, Apodemus agrarius LC
        - Yellow-breasted field mouse, Apodemus fulvipectus LC
        - Black Sea field mouse, Apodemus ponticus LC
        - Ural field mouse, Apodemus uralensis LC
      - Genus: Micromys
        - Eurasian harvest mouse, Micromys minutus LC
      - Genus: Rattus
        - Brown rat, R. norvegicus LC introduced

== Locally extinct ==
The following species are locally extinct in the country:

- Cheetah, Acinonyx jubatus
- Moose, Alces alces
- Onager, Equus hemionus
- Goitered gazelle, Gazella subgutturosa
- Lion, Panthera leo
- Tiger, Panthera tigris
- Caucasian moose, Alces alces caucasicus

== See also ==
- Fauna of Armenia
- List of birds of Armenia
- List of chordate orders
- Lists of mammals by region
- Mammal classification
- Wildlife of Armenia
