= Kabudlar =

Kabudlar كبودلر
- Village
- Location within Iran
- Coordinates: 33°33′26″N 48°42′39″E
- Country: Iran
- Province: Lorestan
- County: Khorramabad
- Bakhsh: Zagheh
- Rural District: Zagheh

Population (2006)
  - Total: 71
- Time zone: UTC+3:30 (IRST)
  - Summer (DST): UTC+4:30 (IRDT)

Kabudlar (Persian: كبودلر, also Romanized as Kabūdlar; also known as Kabūdeh-ye Dehjū and Jūb Now-ye Kabūdlar) is a village in Zagheh Rural District, Zagheh District, Khorramabad County, Lorestan Province, Iran. At the 2006 census, its population was 71, in 15 families.
