= Kabudan, East Azerbaijan =

Kabudan كبودان
- Village
- Location within Iran
- Coordinates: 38°53′21″N 47°06′20″E
- Country: Iran
- Province: East Azerbaijan
- County: Kaleybar
- Bakhsh: Central
- Rural District: Yeylaq

Population (2006)
  - Total: 16
- Time zone: UTC+3:30 (IRST)
  - Summer (DST): UTC+4:30 (IRDT)

Kabudan (Persian: كبودان, also Romanized as Kabūdān; also known as Kārvān) is a village in Yeylaq Rural District, in the Central District of Kaleybar County, East Azerbaijan Province, Iran. At the 2006 census, its population was 16, in 6 families.
