= Kabudeh-ye Hasanabad =

Kabudeh-ye Hasanabad كبوده حسن اباد
- Village
- Location within Iran
- Coordinates: 33°45′59″N 48°28′37″E
- Country: Iran
- Province: Lorestan
- County: Khorramabad
- Bakhsh: Bayravand
- Rural District: Beyranvand-e Shomali

Population (2016)
  - Total: 29
- Time zone: UTC+3:30 (IRST)
  - Summer (DST): UTC+4:30 (IRDT)

Kabudeh-ye Hasanabad (Persian: كبوده حسن اباد, also Romanized as Kabūdeh-ye Ḩasanābād) is a village in Beyranvand-e Shomali Rural District, Bayravand District, Khorramabad County, Lorestan Province, Iran. At the 2006 census, its population was 29, in 8 families.
