= Kabudeh-ye Olya =

Kabudeh-ye Olya كبوده عليا
- Village
- Location within Iran
- Coordinates: 34°15′25″N 47°05′37″E
- Country: Iran
- Province: Kermanshah
- County: Kermanshah
- Bakhsh: Central
- Rural District: Qarah Su

Population (2006)
  - Total: 77
- Time zone: UTC+3:30 (IRST)
  - Summer (DST): UTC+4:30 (IRDT)

Kabudeh-ye Olya (Persian: كبوده عليا, also Romanized as Kabūdeh-ye ‘Olyā; also known as Kabūdeh-ye Bālā) is a village in Qarah Su Rural District, in the Central District of Kermanshah County, Kermanshah Province, Iran. At the 2006 census, its population was 77, in 16 families.
