= Armenian birch mouse =

Conservation status
- Critically Endangered (IUCN 3.1)

Scientific classification
- Kingdom: Animalia
- Phylum: Chordata
- Class: Mammalia
- Order: Rodentia
- Family: Sminthidae
- Genus: Sicista
- Species: S. armenica

Binomial name
- Sicista armenica Sokolov & Baskevich, 1988

Species of rodent

The Armenian birch mouse (Sicista armenica) is a species of rodent in the family Sminthidae, the birch mice. This mouse is endemic to Armenia.

== Taxonomy ==
The Armenian birch mouse was first formally described in 1988 by the Russian zoologists Vladimir Evgenevich Sokolov and Marina Isakovna Baskevich with its type locality given as near the village of Hanqavan in Kotayk Province on the Pambak Ridge. It is one of a group of sister species of birch mice found in the Caucasus known as the S. caucasica group. Within this group this species is more closely related to the Kazbeg birch mouse (S. kazbegica) than it is to the western species pair of the Caucasian birch mouse (S. caucasica) and Kluchor birch mouse (S. klucorica), a speciation pattern reflected in other small mammal taxa in the region. The genus Sicista is the only extant genus in the family Sminthidae, the birch mice.

== Description ==
The Armenian birch mouse is similar in appearance to the other species in the S. caucasica group but has a different chromosome count of 2n=36.

== Biology ==
The Armenian birch mouse is little known but other birch mice are nocturnal and feed on seeds, berries and insects. They move across the ground with small jumps and can easily climb on the bushes and trees due to its semi-prehensile tail. The nest, oval shaped, is made of plant remains in a shallow hole dug by the animal itself.

== Distribution and habitat ==
The Armenian birch mouse is endemic to Armenia where it is known from the valley of the Marmarik River in the Razdan River basin in the Pambakskiy Range of the Lesser Caucasus. It is know from two localities, the type locality and the Sevan Pass. This species is found in subalpine meadows with tall grass on the upper forest ecotone.

== Status and conservation ==
The Armenian birch mouse is assessed as being Critically endangered by the International Union for Conservation of Nature because this species is known from two locations and despite searching a number of suitable locations only one individual was found in 2017 in the Sevan Pass.
