= Climate of Armenia =

Armenia map of Köppen climate classification.

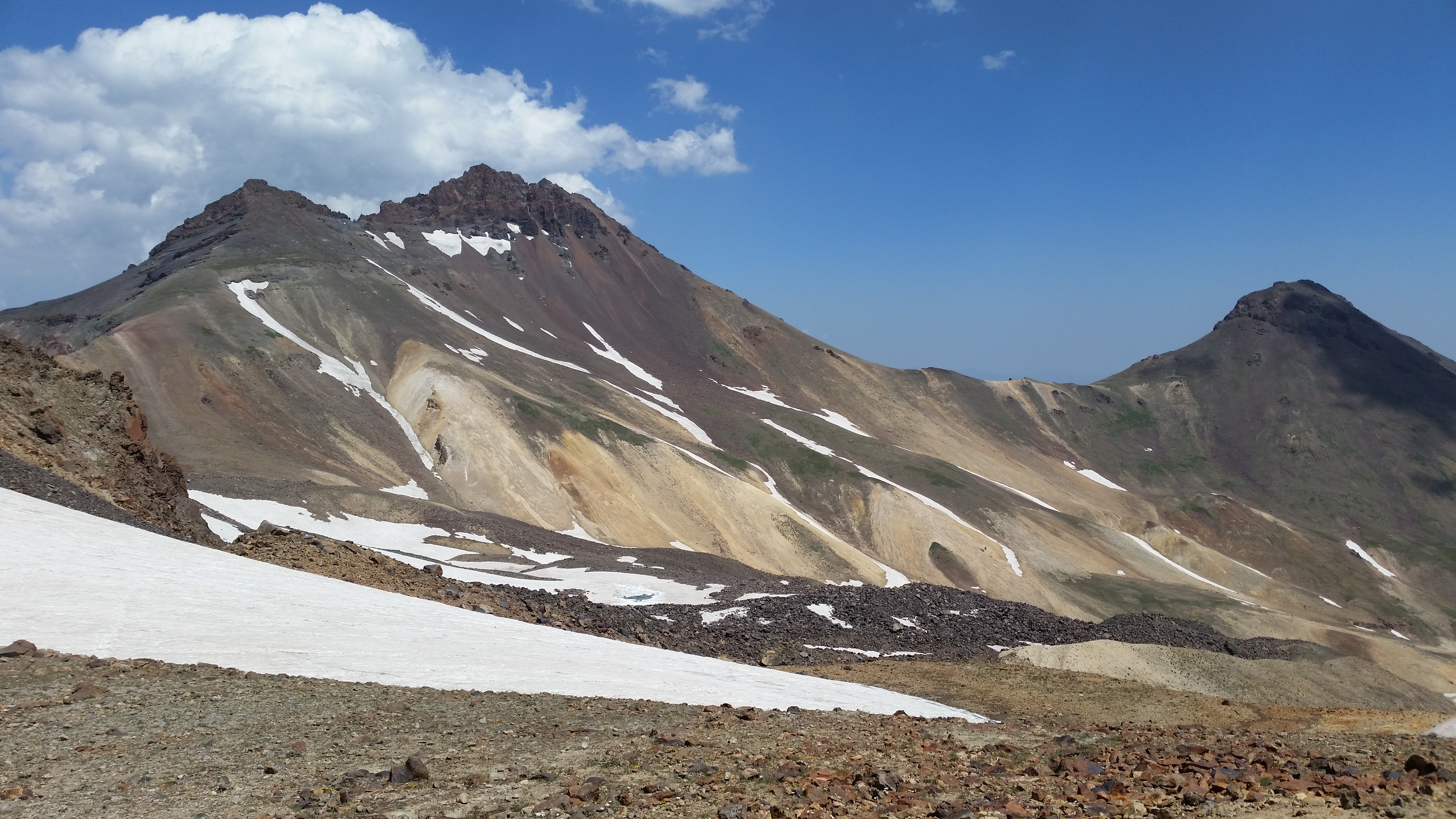
Tundra climate, at the northern peak of Mt. Aragats.

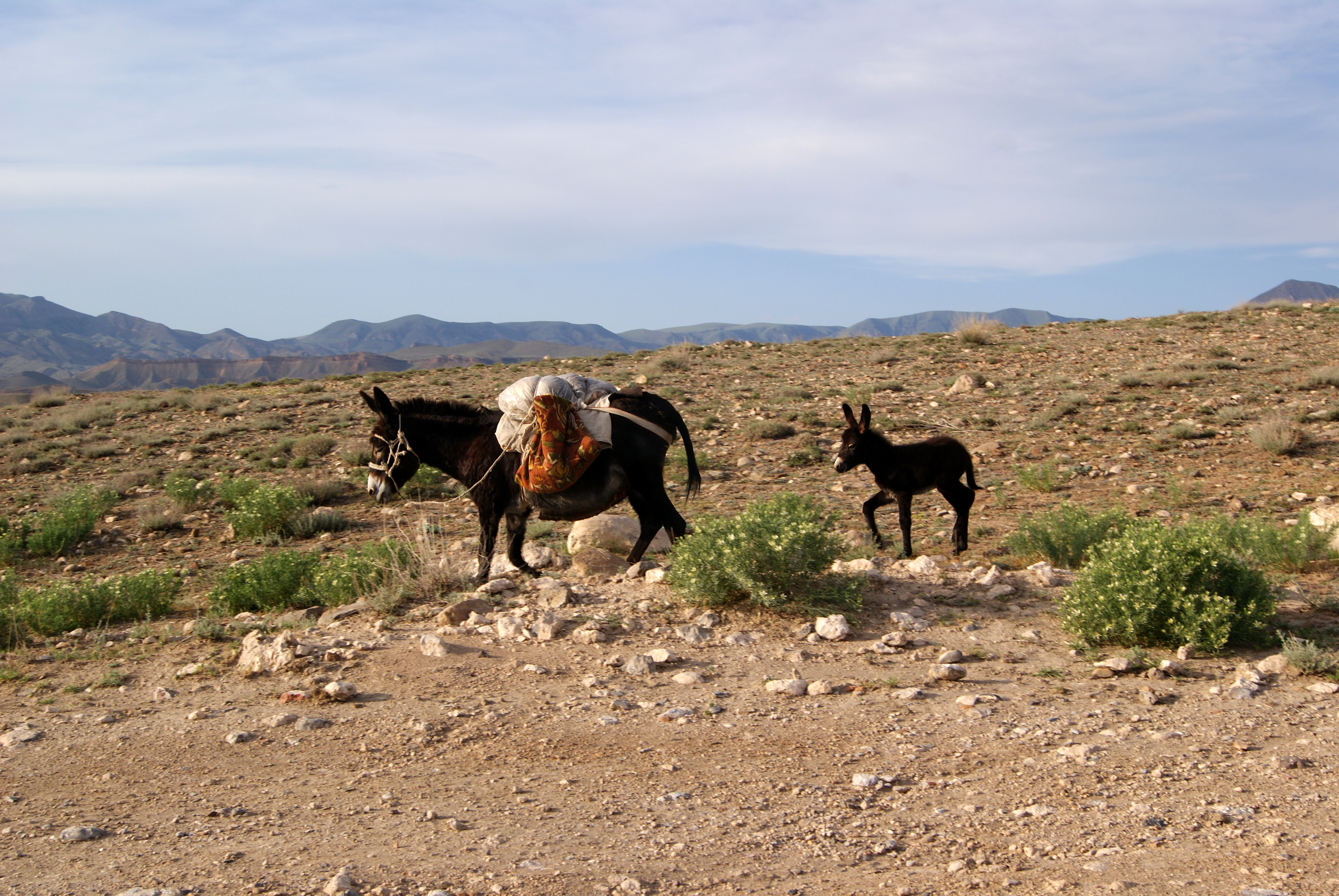
Cold desert climate, at Goravan Sands Sanctuary.

In Armenia, climates vary from cold desert and cold steppe on the lower parts of the Ararat plain, to tundra on mountain peaks, and a humid continental climate in the inner parts. The following six basic types can be distinguished. Another type of climate is the dry continental type. It prevails mostly along the middle reaches of the Arax up to an elevation of 1,300 m. It differs from the dry subtropical climate by its cold winters.

== History ==
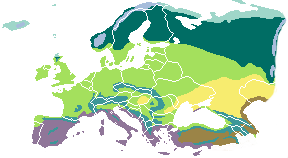
Biomes of Europe and surrounding regions: tundra alpine tundra taiga montane forest temperate broadleaf forest mediterranean forest temperate steppe dry steppe

According to historical sources, in ancient times the winter was the same as it is today, fairly cold in the Armenian lowlands and high in the mountains. 4th century B.C. Greek historian Xenophon, in his Anabasis (The Retreat of the 10,000), which describes the retreat of 10,000 Greek mercenaries through the Armenian mountains into the autumn, related that at night, when the soldiers were asleep, snow fell in the mountains and covered the men and their weapons. He wrote that the snow that fell in one night was about one meter deep. In the same work he noted that the Armenians protected themselves against the freezing frost by rubbing fat or almond oil into their bodies. Armenian historian Movses Khorenatsi (5th century A. D.) described the climate of the Ararat plain as hot and dry in the summer.

Human settlement	Height	Precipitation (mm)	Daily mean °C	Average snow depth	Maximum snow depth	Minimum snow depth	Days of snow cover	Humidity %
Bagratashen	453	444	11.7	—	—	—	—	72
Ijevan	732	563	10.6	10	28	1	38	73
Vanadzor	1350	586	7.4	17	38	3	72	71
Stepanavan	1397	683	6.6	19	53	4	73	73
Tashir	1507	713	5.8	17	37	2	72	75
Spitak	1552	439	7.1	12	56	2	63	69
Chambarak	1861	557	4.8	16	37	5	102	74
Meghri	627	259	13.8	5	27	0	21	61
Kapan	705	544	11.5	10	32	2	34	71
Artashat	829	235	11.1	10	44	0	39	65
Armavir	861	244	11.3	10	42	0	45	60
Yerevan	942	316	11.4	12	46	0	44	60
Yeghvard	1317	407	9.8	28	68	0	74	62
Areni	1009	357	11.8	14	—	—	40	56
Eghegnadzor	1267	398	10.8	18	—	—	50	66
Sisian	1580	365	6.6	12	34	3	73	68
Gyumri	1556	477	5.8	26	61	4	96	70
Talin	1582	435	7.9	24	64	2	82	59
Artik	1750	516	5.8	22	51	5	95	66
Fantan	1798	640	6.0	50	79	13	124	66
Aparan	1291	651	4.3	56	92	10	125	69
Sevan	1936	556	4.0	36	83	3	136	74
Mets Masrik	1940	390	4.2	21	35	7	109	69
Martuni	1995	457	5.6	26	75	2	98	67
Nshkhark	2334	488	2.7	64	102	33	160	72
Paghakn	2004	574	1.8	53	81	17	138	74
Aragats (mount)	3329	1065	-2.7	166	235	66	252	73

== Climate change ==
Like many countries of the world, Armenia is no exception at experiencing climatic changes over the past decades. Reports, such as the World Bank Group's, show that the country has already undergone climate variability, leaving different systems affected. This is due to high vulnerability to external shocks. The high share of natural gas puts Armenia below the global average in terms of greenhouse emissions. These exposures affect natural resources and other aspects of the environment.

Data indicates that Armenia's average temperature has risen by more than 1.2°C since 1929. Specialists have also documented an increase in changes in precipitation patterns that contribute to the concerns connected to water scarcity. The latter could be due to earlier snowmelt and reduced snowfall. This lowers river levels in summer and creates irrigation shortages. The results of the annual river flow assessment carried out for 2020, 2070 and 2100, show a prediction of river flow reduction by 14-39%. This changes the narrative for farming regions that need a constant water supply.

Ecosystems, as well as Biodiversity, are also being influenced. Many plant and animal species are losing their natural habitats, as forests are becoming vulnerable to degradation and wildfires. The CBD Sixth National Report states that more than 17,000 hectares of forest (5-5.5%) may disappear due to unfavorable conditions for forest growth. It was found that forest areas have significantly reduced.

Armenia has begun integrating climate considerations into national strategies. Armenia's government has created certain policies and international commitments, which include updated Nationally Determined Contributions under the Paris Agreement, planning to reduce greenhouse gas emissions and expand renewable use. The government also cooperates with international organizations, such as United Nations Framework Convention on Climate Change, the European Union, Global Environment Facility, and United Nations Development Programme. There are also programs, supported by the United Nations and other partners, focusing on climate-resilient management and protection to assist communities in adapting quickly to changing environmental conditions. The Ministry of Environment (Armenia), in partnership with the World Bank, developed a program called Resiland, which aimed to promote sustainable activities to resist climate change effects.

== Data for selected stations ==
Climate data for Yerevan (1991–2020, extremes 1885–present)
Month	Jan	Feb	Mar	Apr	May	Jun	Jul	Aug	Sep	Oct	Nov	Dec	Year
Record high °C (°F)	19.5 (67.1)	19.6 (67.3)	27.6 (81.7)	35.0 (95.0)	36.1 (97.0)	41.1 (106.0)	43.7 (110.7)	42.0 (107.6)	40.0 (104.0)	34.1 (93.4)	26.0 (78.8)	20.0 (68.0)	43.7 (110.7)
Mean daily maximum °C (°F)	1.7 (35.1)	6.3 (43.3)	13.7 (56.7)	19.8 (67.6)	25.1 (77.2)	30.9 (87.6)	34.5 (94.1)	34.4 (93.9)	29.2 (84.6)	21.6 (70.9)	12.8 (55.0)	4.2 (39.6)	19.5 (67.1)
Daily mean °C (°F)	−3.5 (25.7)	0.0 (32.0)	7.0 (44.6)	12.9 (55.2)	17.7 (63.9)	23.1 (73.6)	26.8 (80.2)	26.7 (80.1)	21.4 (70.5)	14.0 (57.2)	5.8 (42.4)	−0.8 (30.6)	12.6 (54.7)
Mean daily minimum °C (°F)	−7.8 (18.0)	−5.4 (22.3)	0.9 (33.6)	6.4 (43.5)	10.8 (51.4)	15.1 (59.2)	19.1 (66.4)	18.9 (66.0)	13.2 (55.8)	7.1 (44.8)	0.1 (32.2)	−4.9 (23.2)	6.1 (43.0)
Record low °C (°F)	−27.6 (−17.7)	−26 (−15)	−19.1 (−2.4)	−10.2 (13.6)	−0.6 (30.9)	3.7 (38.7)	7.5 (45.5)	7.9 (46.2)	0.1 (32.2)	−6.5 (20.3)	−14.4 (6.1)	−28.2 (−18.8)	−28.2 (−18.8)
Average precipitation mm (inches)	21 (0.8)	21 (0.8)	60 (2.4)	56 (2.2)	47 (1.9)	24 (0.9)	17 (0.7)	10 (0.4)	10 (0.4)	51 (2.0)	25 (1.0)	21 (0.8)	363 (14.3)
Average extreme snow depth cm (inches)	5 (2.0)	3 (1.2)	1 (0.4)	0 (0)	0 (0)	0 (0)	0 (0)	0 (0)	0 (0)	0 (0)	0 (0)	1 (0.4)	5 (2.0)
Average rainy days	2	4	8	12	12	8	5	4	4	8	7	4	78
Average snowy days	7	7	2	0.2	0	0	0	0	0	0.1	1	5	22
Average relative humidity (%)	81	74	62	59	58	51	47	47	51	64	73	79	62
Mean monthly sunshine hours	92.6	125.4	177.3	206.7	263.0	321.6	352.4	332.5	293.0	221.2	148.0	87.3	2,620.8
Source 1: Pogoda.ru.net
Source 2: NOAA (sun 1981–2010)

Climate data for Ananun Pass(elevation:2122.122m 39°49′50″N 44°59′31″E), 1991–2020
Month	Jan	Feb	Mar	Apr	May	Jun	Jul	Aug	Sep	Oct	Nov	Dec	Year
Record high °C (°F)	9.5 (49.1)	9.6 (49.3)	16.3 (61.3)	23.5 (74.3)	25.0 (77.0)	30.2 (86.4)	34.5 (94.1)	33.0 (91.4)	30.0 (86.0)	23.6 (74.5)	16.0 (60.8)	13.4 (56.1)	34.5 (94.1)
Daily mean °C (°F)	−6.1 (21.0)	−5.1 (22.8)	−0.8 (30.6)	4.8 (40.6)	9.7 (49.5)	14.8 (58.6)	18.6 (65.5)	19.1 (66.4)	14.8 (58.6)	8.6 (47.5)	1.3 (34.3)	−3.6 (25.5)	6.3 (43.4)
Record low °C (°F)	−23 (−9)	−20 (−4)	−16 (3)	−17 (1)	−5 (23)	−0.5 (31.1)	1.5 (34.7)	6 (43)	−2 (28)	−5.5 (22.1)	−15.5 (4.1)	−19 (−2)	−23 (−9)
Average precipitation mm (inches)	44.9 (1.77)	44.6 (1.76)	53.6 (2.11)	80.1 (3.15)	74.1 (2.92)	35.0 (1.38)	22.2 (0.87)	14.6 (0.57)	18.6 (0.73)	38.9 (1.53)	36.9 (1.45)	40.8 (1.61)	504.3 (19.85)
Average precipitation days (≥ 1.0 mm)	6.8	7.3	8.7	10.9	11.8	6.1	3.3	2.2	3.2	6	6	6.8	79.1
Average relative humidity (%)	75.7	74.6	71.8	69.7	69.2	63.1	61.3	58.1	58.6	65.6	72	74.6	67.9
Source: NOAA

Climate data for Vorortani Pass(elevation:2387.5m 39°41′35″N 45°42′42″E), 1991–2020
Month	Jan	Feb	Mar	Apr	May	Jun	Jul	Aug	Sep	Oct	Nov	Dec	Year
Record high °C (°F)	9.6 (49.3)	7.0 (44.6)	10.5 (50.9)	21.5 (70.7)	24.3 (75.7)	26.6 (79.9)	30.0 (86.0)	30.2 (86.4)	27.8 (82.0)	20.3 (68.5)	14.2 (57.6)	14.5 (58.1)	30.2 (86.4)
Daily mean °C (°F)	−8.1 (17.4)	−7.3 (18.9)	−3.6 (25.5)	1.7 (35.1)	7.3 (45.1)	11.6 (52.9)	13.8 (56.8)	14.5 (58.1)	11.7 (53.1)	6.3 (43.3)	−1.1 (30.0)	−6.0 (21.2)	3.4 (38.1)
Record low °C (°F)	−24.4 (−11.9)	−23.5 (−10.3)	−20.1 (−4.2)	−16.3 (2.7)	−6.6 (20.1)	−0.2 (31.6)	2.1 (35.8)	3.4 (38.1)	−4.8 (23.4)	−9.0 (15.8)	−15.4 (4.3)	−20.4 (−4.7)	−24.4 (−11.9)
Average precipitation mm (inches)	47.4 (1.87)	46.5 (1.83)	49.0 (1.93)	71.0 (2.80)	79.6 (3.13)	57.9 (2.28)	40.1 (1.58)	23.8 (0.94)	25.0 (0.98)	42.2 (1.66)	44.5 (1.75)	46.4 (1.83)	573.4 (22.58)
Average precipitation days (≥ 1.0 mm)	8.1	8.2	9.3	10.5	12.5	8.1	5.3	3.5	3.9	7	7.1	8.5	92
Average relative humidity (%)	87.3	87.5	87	84.9	82.4	81.3	80.5	76.6	75.7	79.1	84.4	86.7	82.8
Source: NOAA

== See also ==
- Geography of Armenia
- Wildlife of Armenia
