= Kabudeh-ye Sofla =

Kabudeh-ye Sofla كبوده سفلي
- Village
- Location within Iran
- Coordinates: 34°16′32″N 47°05′45″E
- Country: Iran
- Province: Kermanshah
- County: Kermanshah
- Bakhsh: Central
- Rural District: Qarah Su

Population (2006)
  - Total: 119
- Time zone: UTC+3:30 (IRST)
  - Summer (DST): UTC+4:30 (IRDT)

Kabudeh-ye Sofla (Persian: كبوده سفلي, also Romanized as Kabūdeh-ye Soflá; also known as Kabūdeh-ye Pā’īn) is a village in Qarah Su Rural District, in the Central District of Kermanshah County, Kermanshah Province, Iran. At the 2006 census, its population was 119, in 25 families.
