= Kabudan Island =

Island in Iran

Native name: قویونداغی آداسی
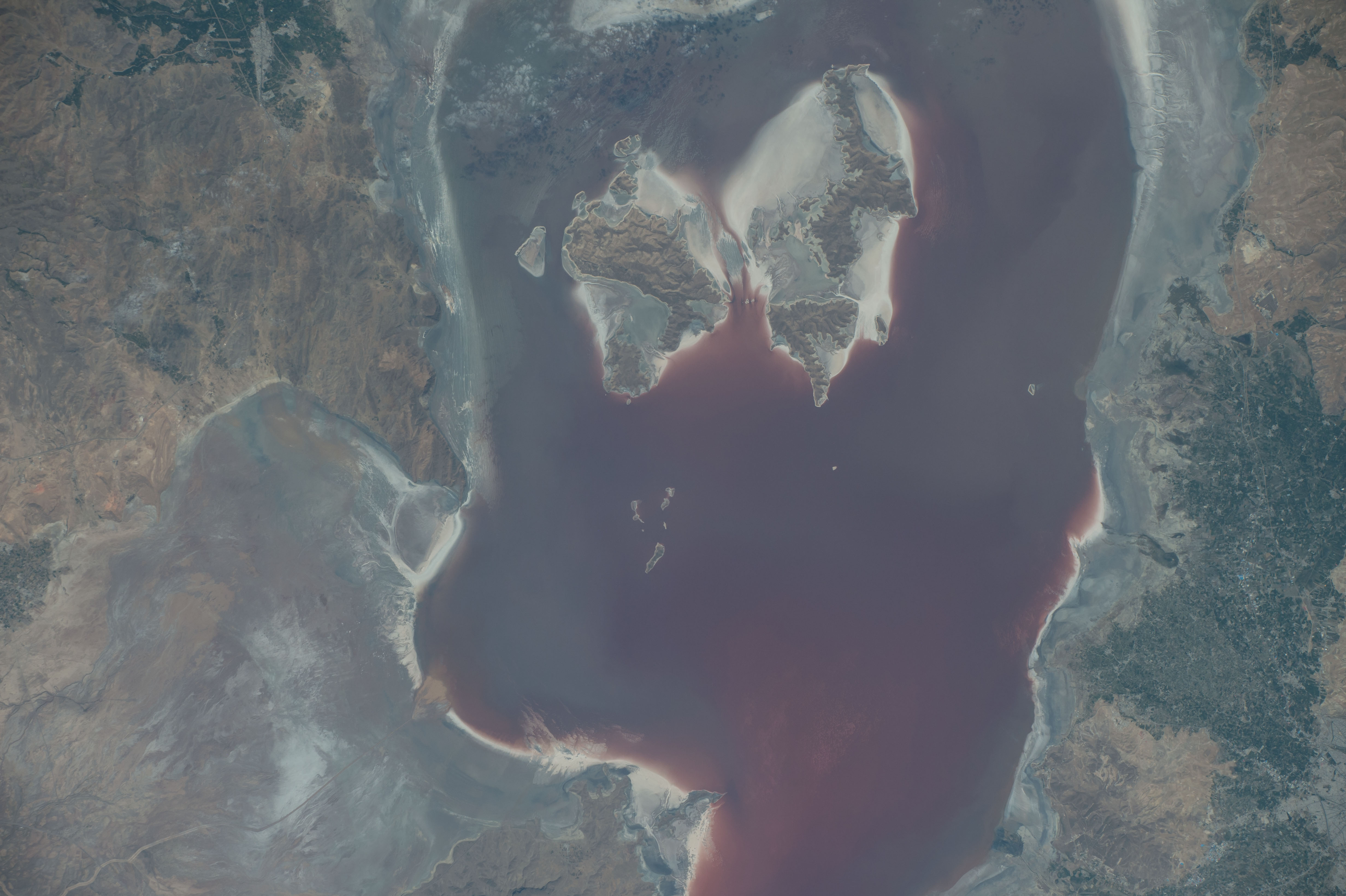
- Kaboodan Island

- Location within Iran
- Interactive map of Kabudan Island

Geography
- Location: Persian Gulf
- Coordinates: 37°28′49″N 45°37′15″E

Administration
- Iran

Kabudan Island or Goyundaği adasi Island (Persian: قویونداغی آداسی) is an island of the Urmia Lake in Iran. Covering an area of about 3,175 hectares, it is located in the east of the lake. Goyundaği adasi Island was declared a protected area by the Department of Environment in 1967.

== Sources ==
- "Kaboodan Island, Urmia". 2020. Iran Travel Guide. Accessed March 6, 2020. .
- Sirang Rasaneh, www.sirang.com. 2020. "Kaboodan Island (Qoyundagi) 2020 Tourist Attraction In Orumieh, Travel To Iran, Visit Iran". Itto.Org | Iran Tourism & Touring. Accessed March 6, 2020. .
