= Kabudeh, South Khorasan =

Kabudeh كبوده
- Village
- Location within Iran
- Coordinates: 32°29′18″N 59°34′32″E
- Country: Iran
- Province: South Khorasan
- County: Sarbisheh
- Bakhsh: Mud
- Rural District: Naharjan

Population (2006)
  - Total: 34
- Time zone: UTC+3:30 (IRST)
  - Summer (DST): UTC+4:30 (IRDT)

Kabudeh (Persian: كبوده, also Romanized as Kabūdeh; also known as Qal‘eh-ye Kabūdeh, and Kaboodan) is a village in Naharjan Rural District, Mud District, Sarbisheh County, South Khorasan Province, Iran. At the 2006 census, its population was 34, in 12 families.
