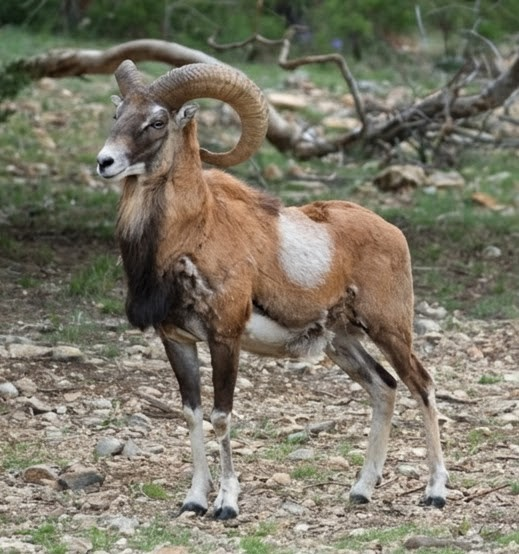
- On Hatada Ranch, Valley Mills, Texas, USA.

Scientific classification
- Kingdom: Animalia
- Phylum: Chordata
- Class: Mammalia
- Order: Artiodactyla
- Family: Bovidae
- Subfamily: Caprinae
- Genus: Ovis
- Species: O. orientalis
- Subspecies: O. o. gmelini

Trinomial name
- Ovis orientalis gmelini Blyth, 1841

Synonyms
- Ovis gmelini gmelinii Ovis gmelini Ovis ammon orientalis Ovis ophion armeniana (Nasonov, 1919)

= Armenian mouflon =

Subspecies of mammal

The Armenian mouflon (Ovis orientalis gmelini) is an endangered subspecies of mouflon endemic to Iran, Armenia, the Nakhchivan Autonomous Republic of Azerbaijan, Turkey and Iraq.

== Taxonomy ==
The Armenian mouflon was first described in 1840 by Edward Blyth, who equated it with the "Orientalische Schaaf" (Oriental sheep) described by Samuel Gottlieb Gmelin in 1774.

It is known as the Armenian mouflon in both Armenian: հայկական մուֆլոն, haykakan muflon and Persian: قوچ‌ ارمنی, Qutch-e armani. Alternative names include Armenian wild sheep, Armenian red sheep, Transcaucasian mountain sheep, Transcaucasian sheep. and Anatolian mouflon.

== Distribution and population ==
In Iran, Armenian mouflons are found in the northwestern part of the country. Individuals were transferred to Kabudan Island in Lake Urmia in 1895 and 1906 by one of the governors of Iranian Azerbaijan. A study carried out in the 1970s at the island found that their number declined from around 3,500 in 1970 to 1,000 in 1973. In 2004 1,658 Armenian wild sheep were counted at the Angouran Protected Area in Iran's Zanjan Province.

In Armenia, O. o. gmelini is found in Syunik Province (and to a lesser extent, in the provinces of Ararat and Vayots Dzor). According to a 2009 study there were "hardly over 200" mouflons in Armenia.

In Azerbaijan, an estimated 250 to 300 mouflons are found in the Nakhchivan Autonomous Republic.

== Habitat ==
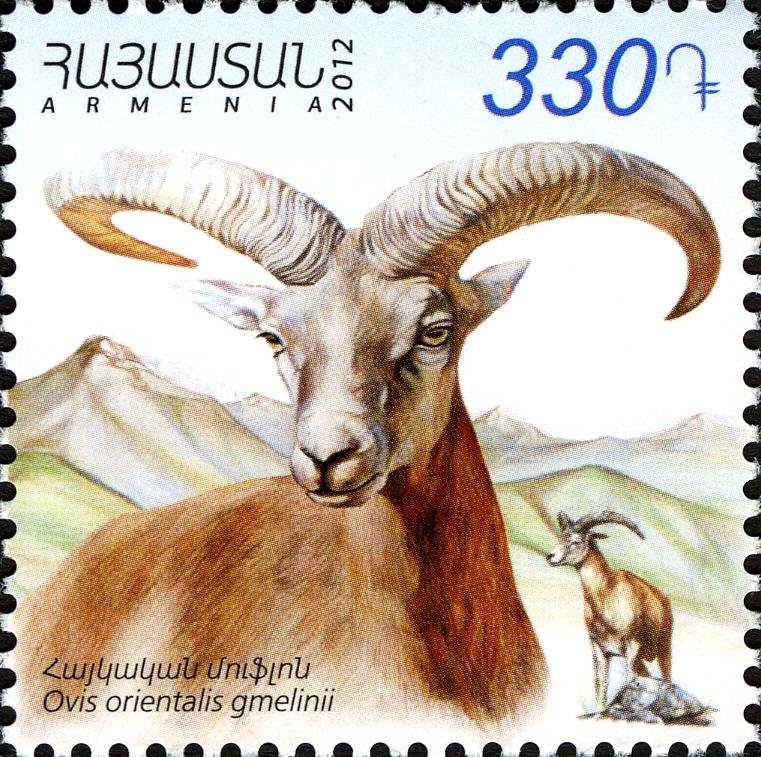
O. o. gmelini on a 2012 Armenian stamp

The Armenian mouflon lives mostly in open rough terrain at medium or high altitudes, where they inhabit rocky hill country, lowland and highland steppes, rocky semideserts and, grass-covered slopes in the southern Caucasus region. They spend the summer at the highest elevations, right below the permanent snow. In winter, they move lower and may come into the valleys. They live in small or large herds (up to several dozen sheep). In the summer, the older males live singly or in separate groups. They may live up to 18 years.

These sheep have been introduced to Texas, USA, where they are used for the activity of hunting.

== Protection measures ==
O. o. gmelini was listed in Category I of the USSR Red Data Book. In Armenia, hunting it has been forbidden since 1936. A captive-breeding program has been initiated at the Zoological Institute of Armenia aiming to expand Khosrov Nature Reserve, reorganize the Orbubad Sanctuary into a state reserve, control livestock, and reduce poaching. As of 2011, the fine for hunting the Armenian mouflon in Armenia was 3 million drams (roughly $8,000).

In Iran, hunting of O. o. gmelini is allowed only under permit, outside the protected areas, between September and February. Within the protected areas, grazing of domestic livestock is strictly controlled.
