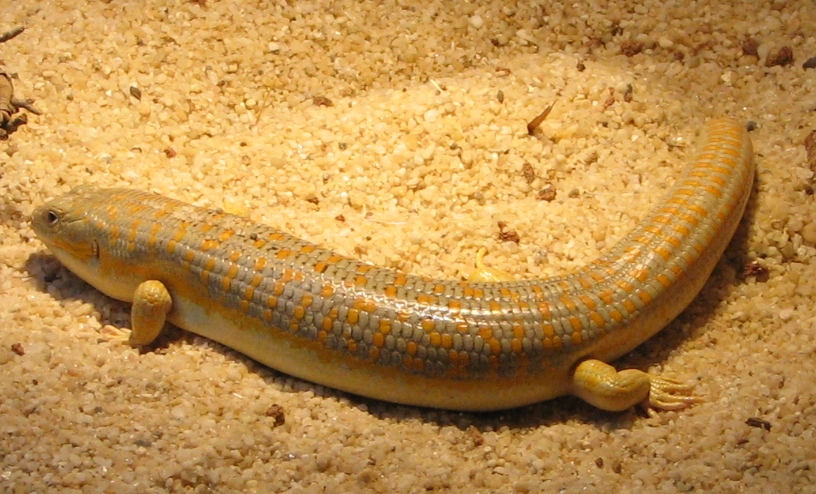

Conservation status
- Least Concern (IUCN 3.1)

Scientific classification
- Kingdom: Animalia
- Phylum: Chordata
- Class: Reptilia
- Order: Squamata
- Family: Scincidae
- Genus: Eumeces
- Species: E. schneiderii

Binomial name
- Eumeces schneiderii (Daudin, 1802)

Synonyms
- Scincus schneiderii Daudin, 1802; Eumeces pavimentatus I. Geoffroy Saint-Hilaire, 1827; Plestiodon aldrovandi A.M.C. Duméril & Bibron, 1839; Eumeces schneideri — Boulenger, 1890; Novoeumeces schneideri — Griffith et al., 2000; Eumeces schneiderii — Bauer et al., 2017

= Schneider's skink =

Species of lizard

Eumeces schneiderii, commonly known as Schneider's skink or Berber skink, is a species of lizard in the family Scincidae. The species is endemic to Central Asia, Western Asia, and North Africa. There are five recognized subspecies.

== Etymology ==
Both the specific name, schneiderii, and one of the common names, Schneider's skink, are in honor of German zoologist Johann Gottlob Theaenus Schneider.

The subspecific name, barani, is in honor of Turkish herpetologist İbrahim Baran.

== Description ==
E. schneiderii has the following characters: Head moderate; snout short, obtuse. Nasal rather large, usually divided, in contact with the two anterior upper labials; no postnasal; 5 supraoculars, the three anterior in contact with the frontal; parietals entirely separated by the interparietal; 4 or 5 pairs of nuchals; ear-opening rather large, with 4 or 5 long pointed lobules anteriorly; 2 azygos postmentals. 22 to 28 scales round the middle of the body, perfectly smooth, the laterals smallest, those of the two median dorsal series very broad and larger than the ventrals. The length of the hind limb is contained 2.5 to 3 times in the length from snout to vent. When pressed against the body, the limbs just meet or fail to meet. A series of transversely enlarged subcaudals.

Olive-grey or brownish above, uniform or with irregular golden-yellow spots or longitudinal streaks; a yellowish lateral streak, extending from below the eye to the hind limb, is constant; lower surfaces yellowish white.

Size: from snout to vent, 16.5 cm (6.5 inches); plus tail, 20 cm (8 inches).

== Subspecies ==
Four subspecies are recognized as being valid, including the nominotypical subspecies.

- Eumeces schneiderii barani Kumlutas et al., 2007
- Eumeces schneiderii pavimentatus (I. Geoffroy Saint-Hilaire, 1827)
- Eumeces schneiderii princeps (Eichwald, 1839)
- Eumeces schneiderii schneiderii (Daudin, 1802)

Nota bene: A trinomial authority in parentheses indicates that the subspecies was originally described in a genus other than Eumeces.

== Geographic distribution ==
E. schneiderii is found in Eastern Algeria, Tunisia, Libya, Egypt, Israel, Cyprus, Turkey, western Syria, Lebanon, Jordan, Iran (Kavir desert), Iraq, Saudi Arabia, Transcaucasia, Russia (Dagestan), Turkmenistan, Uzbekistan, Tajikistan, eastern Georgia, southern Armenia, Azerbaijan, Asia Minor, Afghanistan, northern Pakistan, northwestern India.

- Subspecies E. s. barani: Turkey (Anatolia).
- Subspecies E. s. pavimentatus: Jordan, Lebanon, Syria
- Subspecies E. s. princeps: Armenia, Azerbaijan, Caucasus

== Habitat ==
The preferred natural habitats of E. schneiderii are rocky areas, grassland, shrubland, and wetlands, at altitudes of 150–1,800 m (490–5,910 ft).

== Reproduction ==
E. schneiderii is oviparous.
