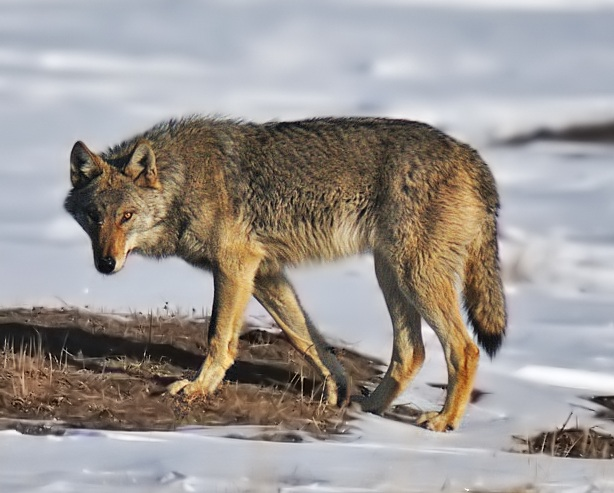

Scientific classification
- Kingdom: Animalia
- Phylum: Chordata
- Class: Mammalia
- Infraclass: Placentalia
- Order: Carnivora
- Family: Canidae
- Genus: Canis
- Species: C. lupus
- Subspecies: C. l. campestris

Trinomial name
- Canis lupus campestris Dwigubski, 1804
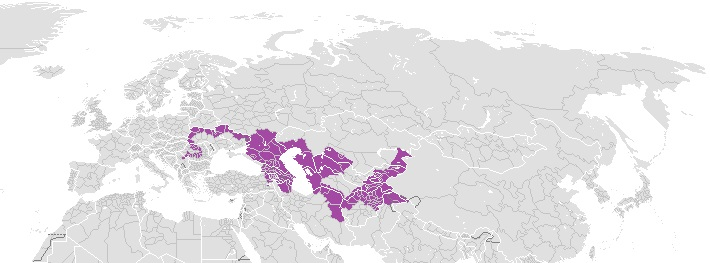
- C. l. campestris range

Synonyms
- argunensis (Dybowski, 1922); bactrianus (Laptev, 1929); cubanenesis (Ognev, 1923); desertorum (Bogdanov, 1882)

= Steppe wolf =

Subspecies of carnivore

The steppe wolf (Canis lupus campestris), also known as the Caspian Sea wolf, is a subspecies of grey wolf native to the steppes surrounding the Caspian Sea, the steppe regions of the Caucasus, the lower Volga region, southern Kazakhstan north to the middle of the Emba, and the steppe regions of the lower European part of the former Soviet Union. It may also occur in northern Afghanistan and Iran, and possibly the steppe regions of far eastern Romania, Hungary and other areas of Eastern Europe. Studies have shown this wolf to be a host for rabies. Due to its close proximity to humans and domestic animals, the need for a reliable vaccine is high.

Rueness et al. (2014) showed that wolves in the Caucasus Mountains, of the putative Caucasian subspecies C. l. cubanensis, are not genetically distinct enough to be considered a subspecies, but may represent a local ecomorph (population) of C. l. lupus. In Kazakhstan, villagers sometimes feed the wolves and utilize them as “guard dogs”.

== Appearance ==
It is of average dimensions, weighing 35–40 kg (77–88 lb), thus being somewhat smaller than the Eurasian wolf, and its fur is sparser, coarser, and shorter. The flanks are light grey, and the back is rusty grey or brownish with a strong admixture of black hairs. The guard hairs on the withers usually do not exceed 7–7.5 cm (2.8–3.0 in). The fur of steppe wolves in Middle Asia and Kazakhstan tends to have more reddish tones. The tail is poorly furred. The skull is 22.4–27.2 cm (8.8–10.7 in) long and 12.8–15.2 cm (5.0–6.0 in) wide.

== Diet ==
Around 89% of the steppe wolf's diet is dominated by wild ungulates, with Siberian roe deer (Capreolus pygargus), red deer (Cervus elaphus), and wild boar (Sus scrofa), making up the majority of ungulates consumed. A smaller fraction of the steppe wolf's diet is made up of buffer prey species such as lagomorphs and small mammals. Steppe wolves occasionally surplus kill Caspian seals.
