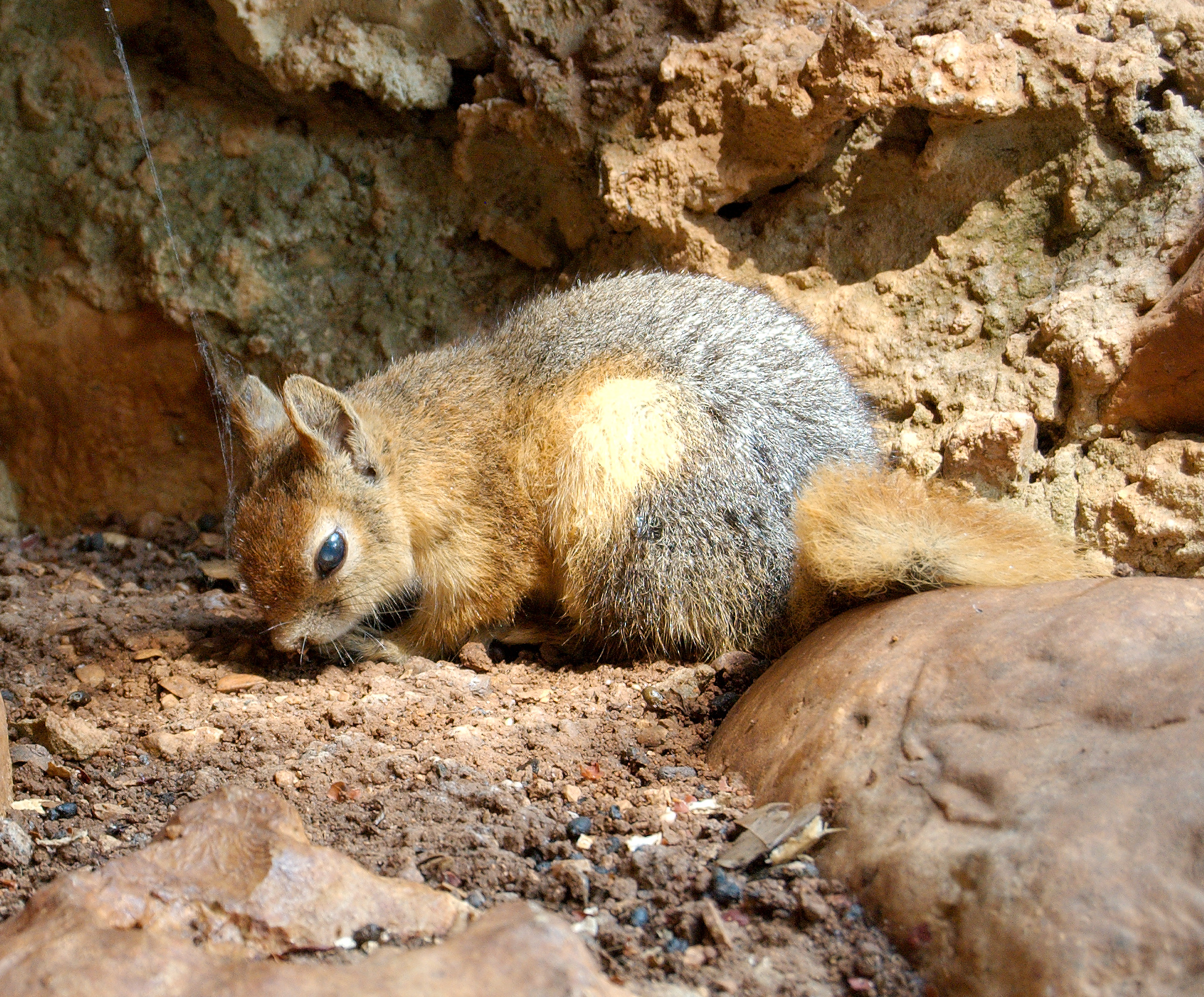

Conservation status
- Least Concern (IUCN 3.1)

Scientific classification
- Kingdom: Animalia
- Phylum: Chordata
- Class: Mammalia
- Order: Rodentia
- Family: Sciuridae
- Genus: Sciurus
- Species: S. anomalus

Binomial name
- Sciurus anomalus Güldenstädt, 1785

Subspecies
- S. a. anomalus; S. a. pallescens; S. a. syriacus
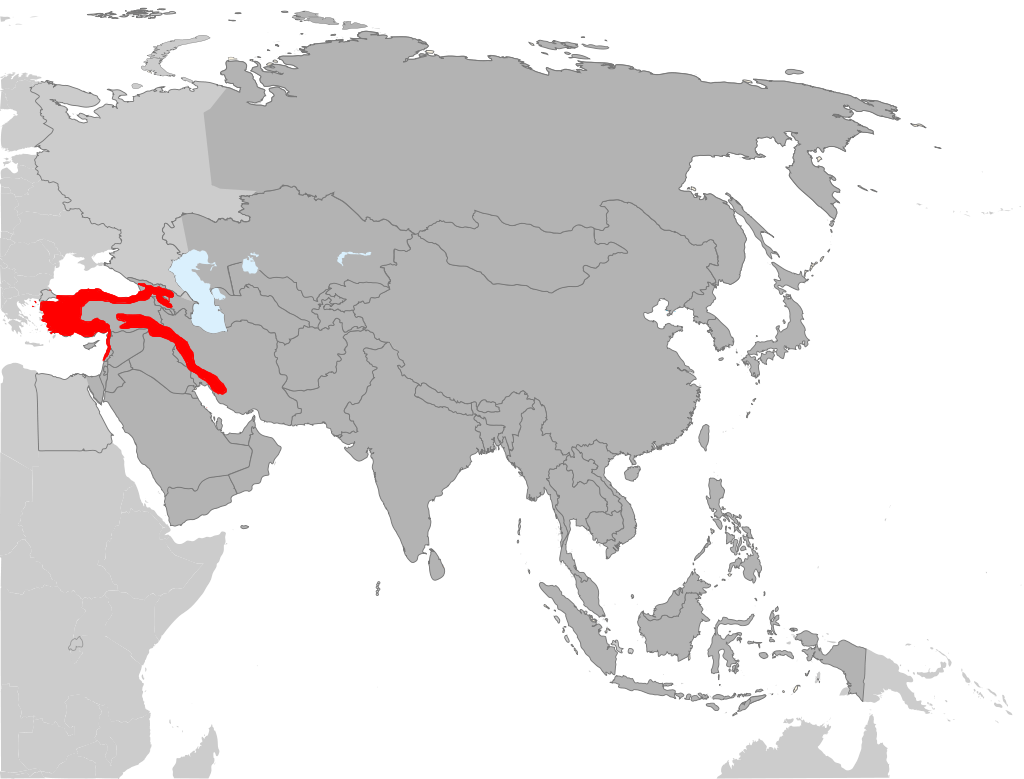
- Persian squirrel's range

= Caucasian squirrel =

Species of rodent

The Caucasian squirrel (Sciurus anomalus) or Persian squirrel is a tree squirrel in the genus Sciurus found in temperate broadleaf and mixed forests in south-western Asia.

The species is traditionally said to have first been described in 1778 by Johann Friedrich Gmelin in the 13th edition of Systema Naturae, and named Sciurus anomalus. However, this work was actually published in 1788, so the true first description was made by Johann Anton Güldenstädt in 1785. Gmelin made reference to this in the 1788 work, citing Güldenstädt as the author.

== Taxonomy and evolution ==
Various positions exist on the taxonomy of the Caucasian squirrel. A 2009 evaluation of the taxonomy of the Sciurus genus found it to not be closely related to the other Old World species, the red squirrel and its immediate offshoots, and to be closer to New World species. A 2020 study on the taxonomy of Sciurinae instead placed the Old World squirrels within a single genus distinct from the New World species.

Sciurus anomalus emerges in the fossil record in the Early Pleistocene, becoming common in Turkey by the Middle Paleolithic and in Lebanon by the Late Paleolithic. It spread southward into the Levant during the Last Interglacial but retreated northward in the Late Pleistocene, leaving relic populations in Israel that persist to the present.

== Description ==
Caucasian squirrels are small tree squirrels, with a total length of 32 to 36 cm (13 to 14 in), including the 13 to 18 cm (5.1 to 7.1 in) tail, and weighing 250 to 410 g (8.8 to 14.5 oz). The color of the upper body fur ranges from greyish brown to pale grey, depending on the subspecies, while that of the underparts is rusty brown to yellowish, and that of the tail is yellow brown to deep red. The claws are relatively short, compared with those of other tree squirrels, and females have either eight or ten teats.

Samuel Griswold Goodrich described the Caucasian squirrel in 1885 as "Its color is grayish-brown above, and yellowish-brown below".

== Distribution and habitat ==
Caucasian squirrels are native to south-western Asia, where they are found from Turkey, and the islands of Gökçeada and Lesbos in the west, Iran in the southeast, and as far as Israel and Jordan in the south. It is one of only two species of the genus Sciurus to be found on Mediterranean islands, and, although Eurasian red squirrels have been recently introduced to some areas, is the only species of Sciurus native to the wider region.

The species mainly lives in mixed and deciduous forests, including ones dominated by oak, pine, and pistachio. They can also be encountered in coniferous forests, rocky areas, and chestnut, walnut, almond, and olive orchards. They are found up to altitudes of 2,000 metres (6,600 ft).

Three subspecies are recognised:

- S. a. anomalus - Lesbos, Turkey and Transcaucasia. Belly is chestnut gray-buff.
- S. a. pallescens - Iraq and the Zagros Mountains and Fars District in Iran. Belly is pale gray.
- S. a. syriacus - Lebanon, Syria, Israel, and Jordan. Belly is yellow to gold.

== Biology and behavior ==
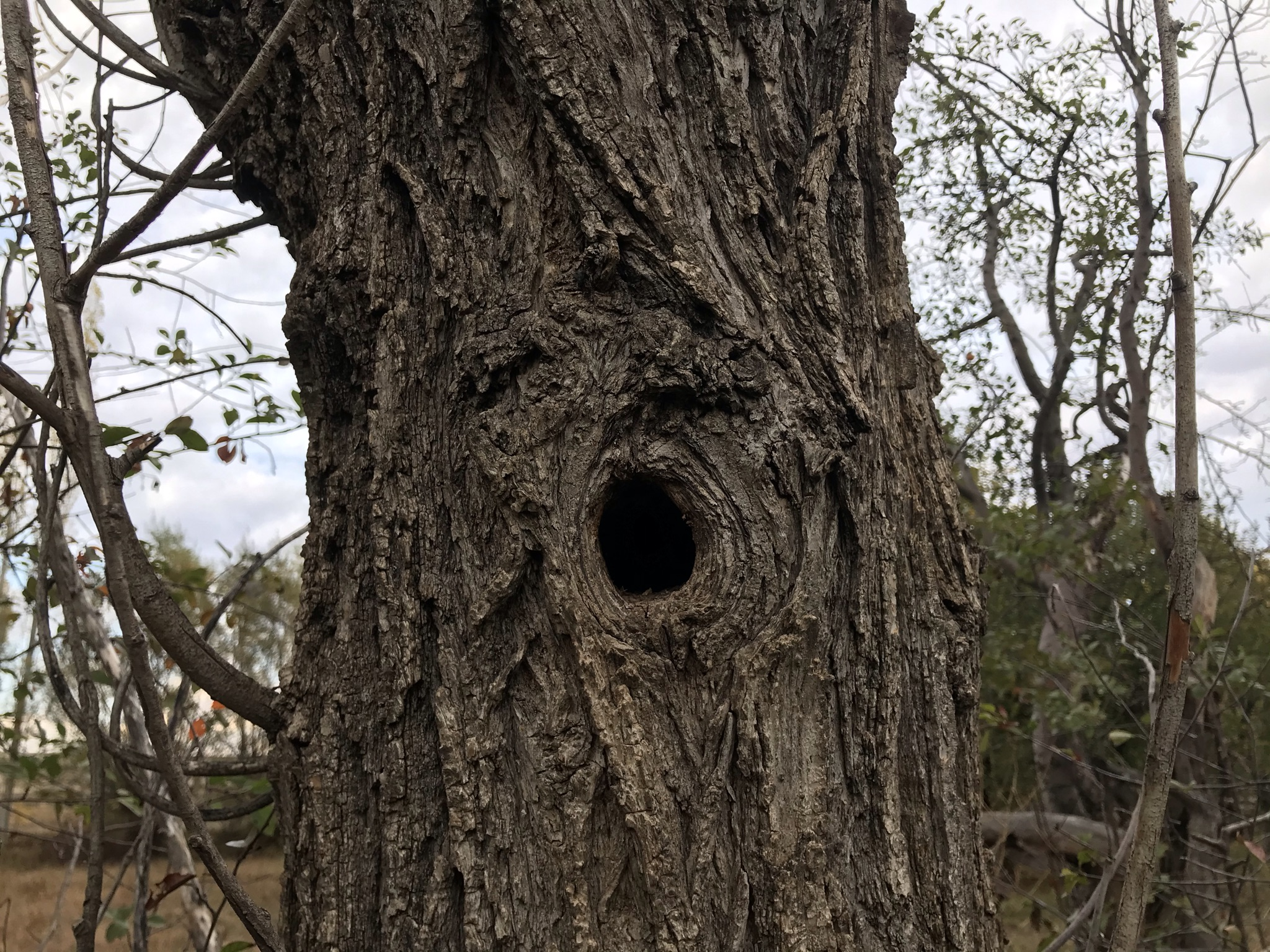
A Caucasian squirrel nest in Suşehri, Turkey

The squirrels are diurnal and solitary, although temporary groups may forage where food is plentiful. Their diet includes nuts, seeds, tree shoots, and buds, with the seeds of oak and pine being particularly favored. Like many other squirrels, they cache their food within tree cavities or loose soil, with some larders containing up to 6 kg (13 lb) of seeds.

They live in trees, where they make their dens, but frequently forage on the ground, and are considered less arboreal than Eurasian red squirrels. They commonly nest in tree hollows lined with moss and leaves, and located 5 to 14 m (16 to 46 ft) above the ground, but nests are also sometimes found under rocks or tree roots. Their alarm call is high-pitched, and said to resemble the call of the European green woodpecker, and they mark their territories with urine and dung.

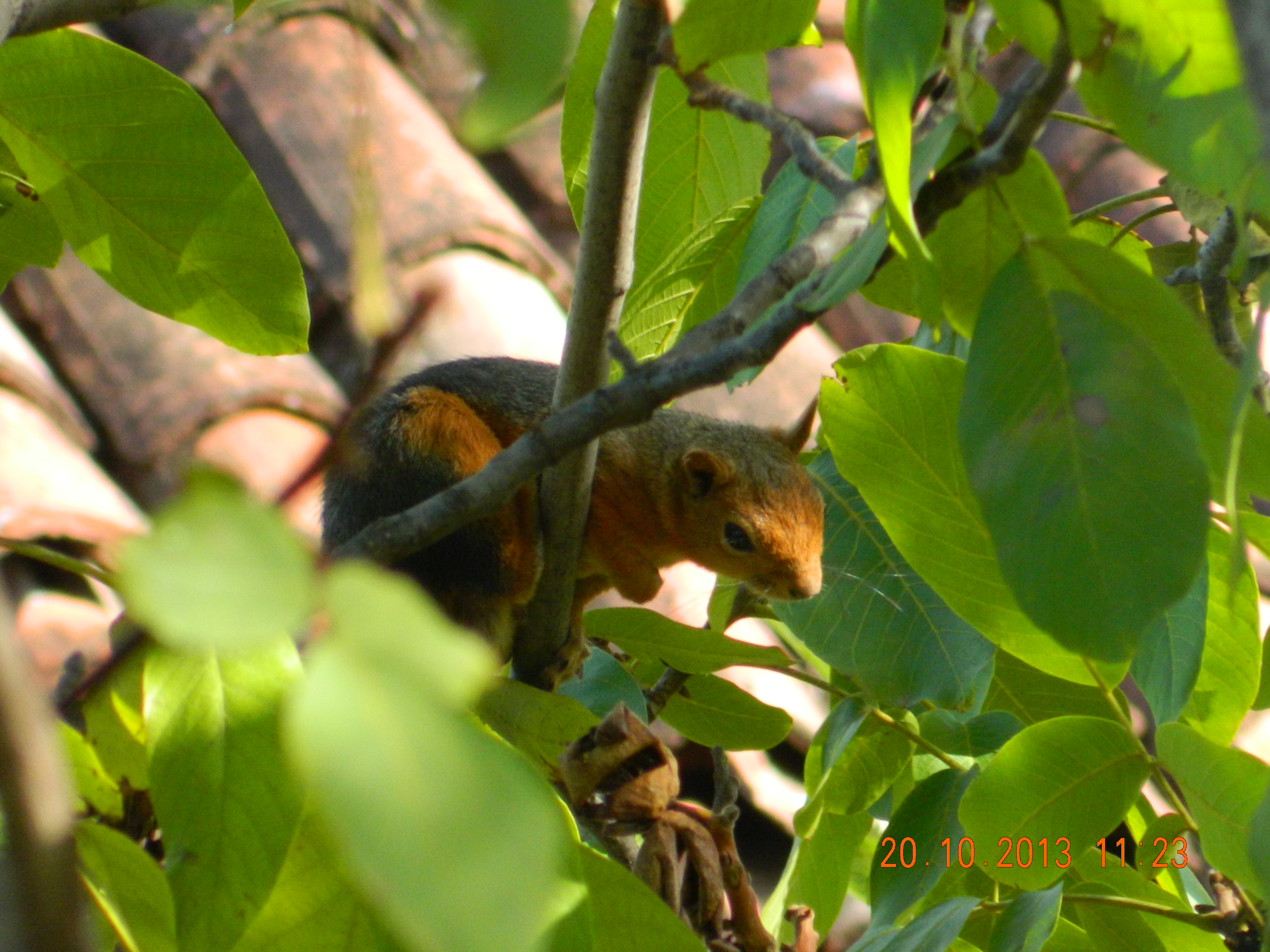
A Caucasian/Anatolian squirrel from Samsun, Alaçam

Breeding occurs throughout the year, but is more common in spring or autumn. Litters range from two to seven, with three or four being typical, and the young are fully mature by five or six months of age.

== Conservation ==
A survey in 2008 found that the species remained abundant within Turkey, however declines are noted in population within the Levant region. The guides for a survey in 1993 in Israel stated that they considered the species to be nearly extinct within the area studied. Whilst the Caucasian squirrel is threatened by poaching and deforestation, the declines recorded are not sufficient to qualify them as anything other than "Least Concern" by the International Union for Conservation of Nature. Hunting of the species is banned by the Central Hunting Commission, and the Caucasian squirrel is protected by the Bern Convention and the EU Habitats Directive.

== Relationship with humans ==
Caucasian squirrels are hunted both as food and for their pelts in most of their range. They are sometimes considered a pest animal in nut and fruit orchards.
