= Gegham mountains =

Mountain range in Armenia

Gegham Ridge
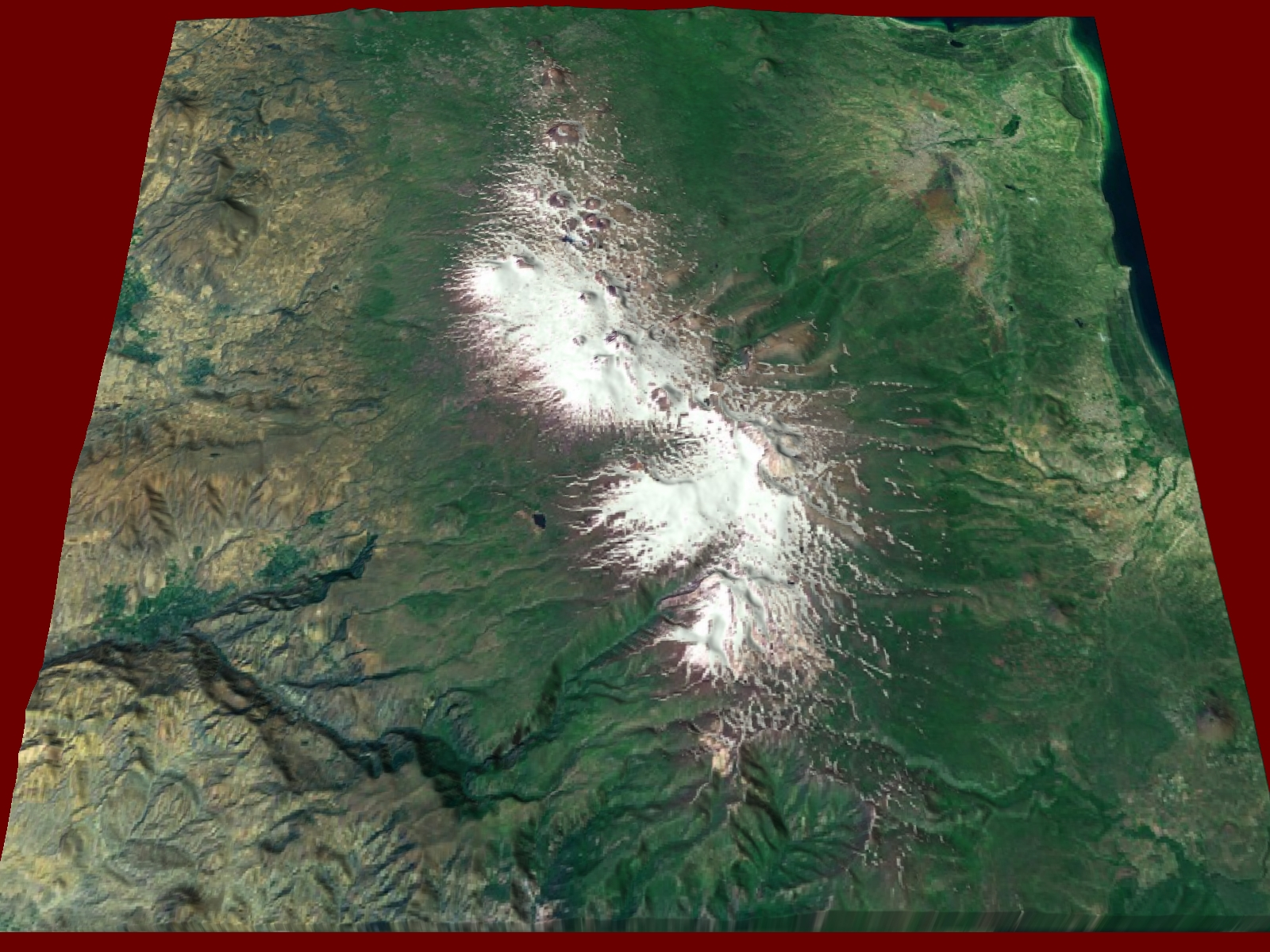
- Gegham from space

Highest point
- Elevation: 3,597 m (11,801 ft)
- Coordinates: 40.275°N 44.75°E

Geography
- Location: Armenia

Geology
- Mountain type: Volcanic field
- Last eruption: 1900 BC ± 1000 years

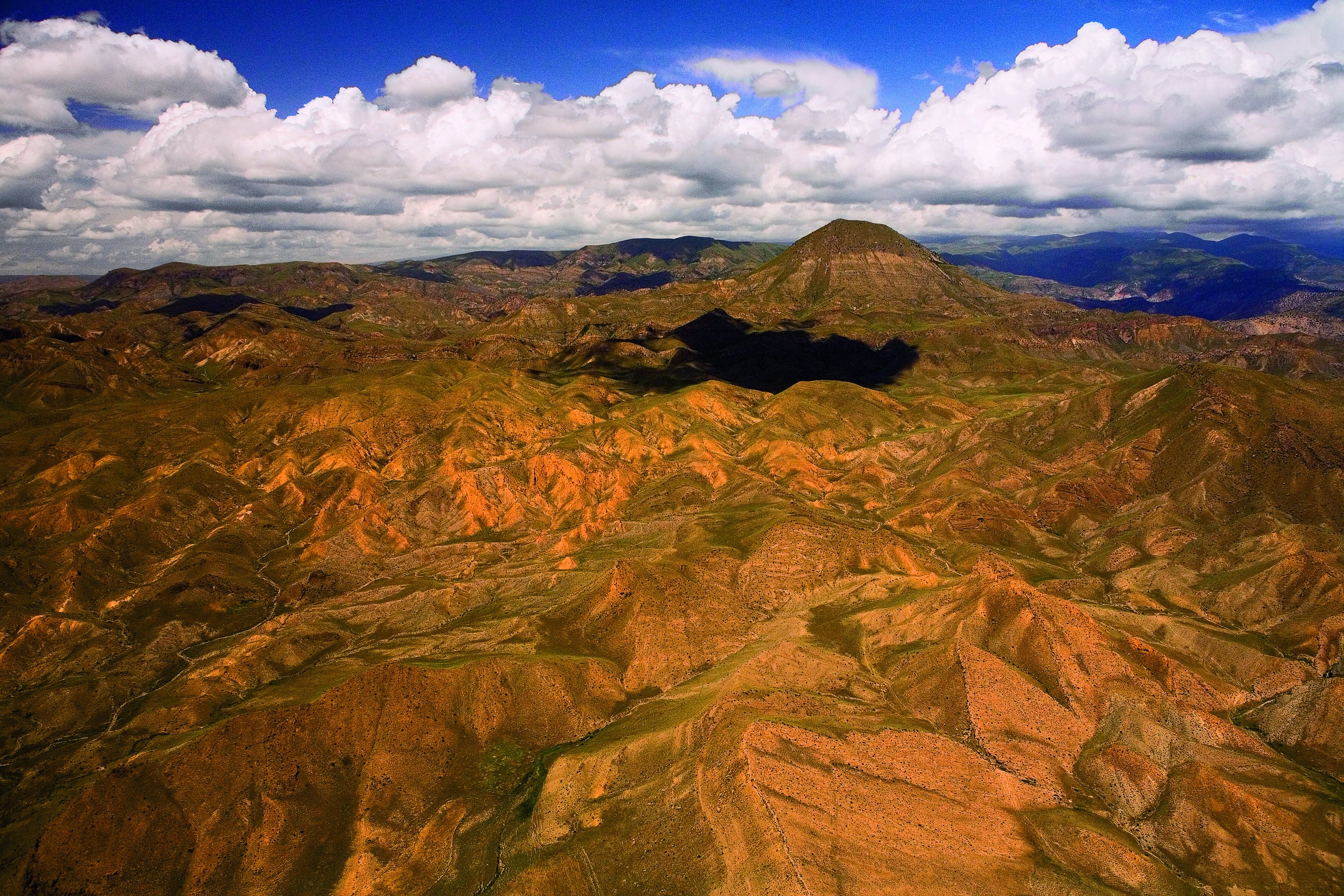

The Gegham mountains (or Gegham Ridge; Armenian: Գեղամա լեռնաշղթա, romanized: Geġama leṙnašġt’a) are a range of mountains in Armenia. The range is a tableland-type watershed basin of Sevan Lake from east, inflows of rivers Araks and Hrazdan from north and west, Azat and Vedi rivers from south-west and Arpachai river from south. The average elevation of the Gegham mountain range is near 2500m. The range is of volcanic origin including many extinct volcanoes. The range is 70 km length and 48 km width, and stretch between Lake Sevan and the Ararat plain. The highest peak of the Gegham mountains is the Azhdahak, at 3597m. They are formed by a volcanic field, containing Pleistocene-to-Holocene lava domes and cinder cones. The highland reaches a height of 1800–2000m up to 3000m in the dividing ridge.

== Geological history ==
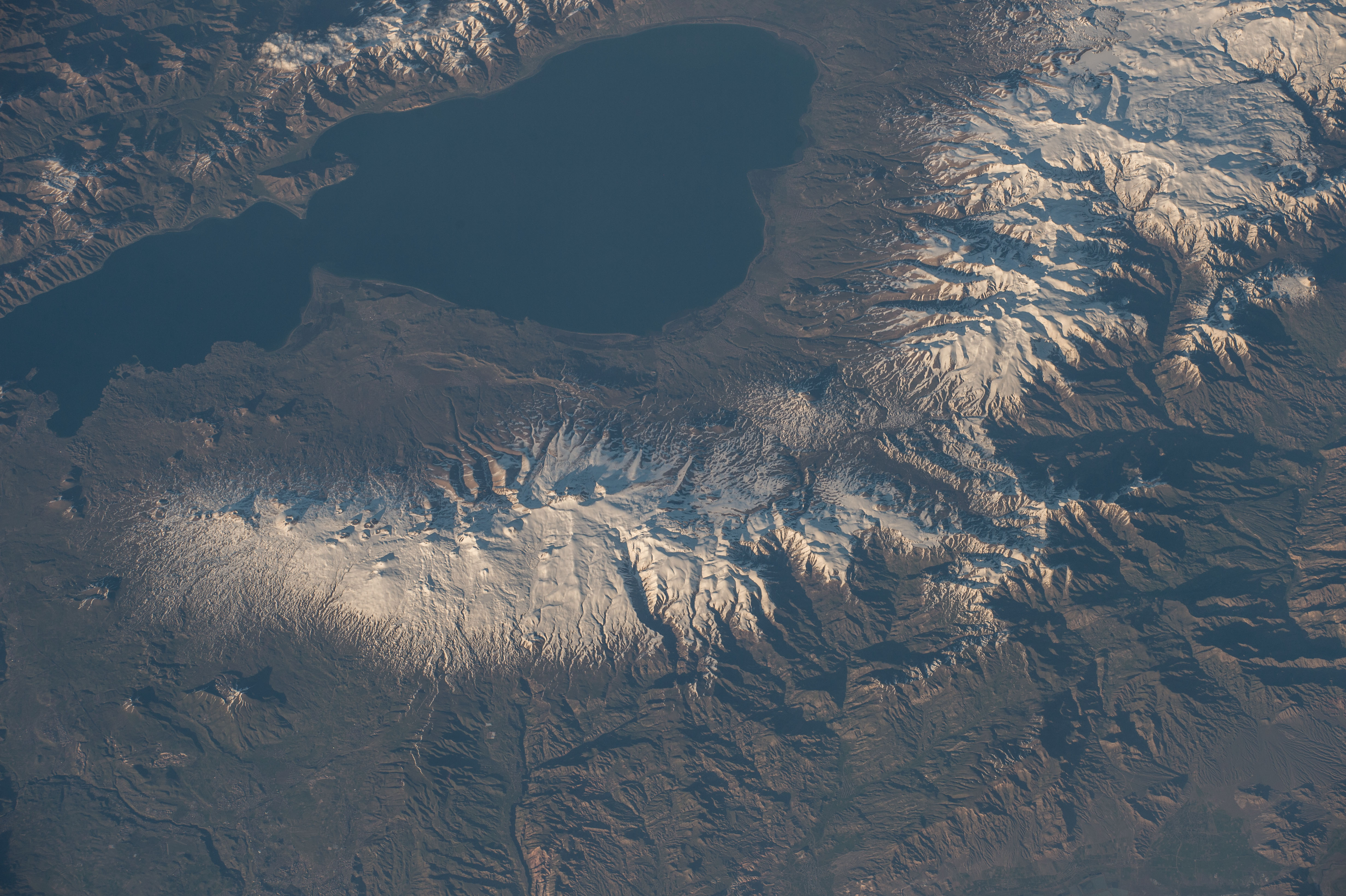
View of Gegham mountains taken during ISS Expedition 47

Volcanism in Armenia and in the Gegham mountains is related to mantle processes accompanying, but not necessarily related to the collision of the Arabian Plate with the Eurasian Plate. Unlike in other parts of the Caucasus region, the Gegham mountains have generated primarily small scale volcanoes. The Kaputan Formation (including Mt. Atis and Gtsain Ridge) from the Late Miocene has been dated at 5.7–4.6 Ma by K-Ar and is the oldest sequence in the region. Late Pliocene activity involved various basaltic lavas (including Lchain Volcano) and subsequently, during the Quaternary, rhyolite and obsidian from the Kotayk centre (Gutansar and Atis 700 ka, then associated fissure volcanoes 550–480 ka). The volcanic activity peaked round 200 ka, when most of the Gegham centres formed from trachyandesitic lavas. Aknotsasar and Sevkatar were active less than 100ka ago. The highest point is the volcano Azhdahak, elevation - 3597.3m above sea level, in the western part of the range. There is a lake in the crater of the volcano Azhdahak that is formed from melting snow.

The volcanoes Spitaksar (3560 m) and Geghasar (3446 m), the former erupted 120ka ago and the latter 80-40ka, are sources of obsidian in Armenia.

== Ecology ==
Bird fauna of Gegham mountains includes about 250 species, 70% of all Armenia's avifauna.

The southeastern slopes of Gegham mountains contain the Khosrov Forest, planted in the 4th century by Khosrov I and converted into a state park in 1958.

The Gegham mountains are one of the primary presences of the vavilovia (Lathyrus formosus) around Mount Sevsar. Another species Poa greuteri is endemic in the area.

== Rock carvings ==
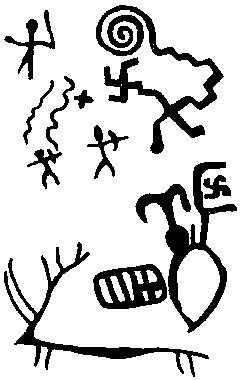

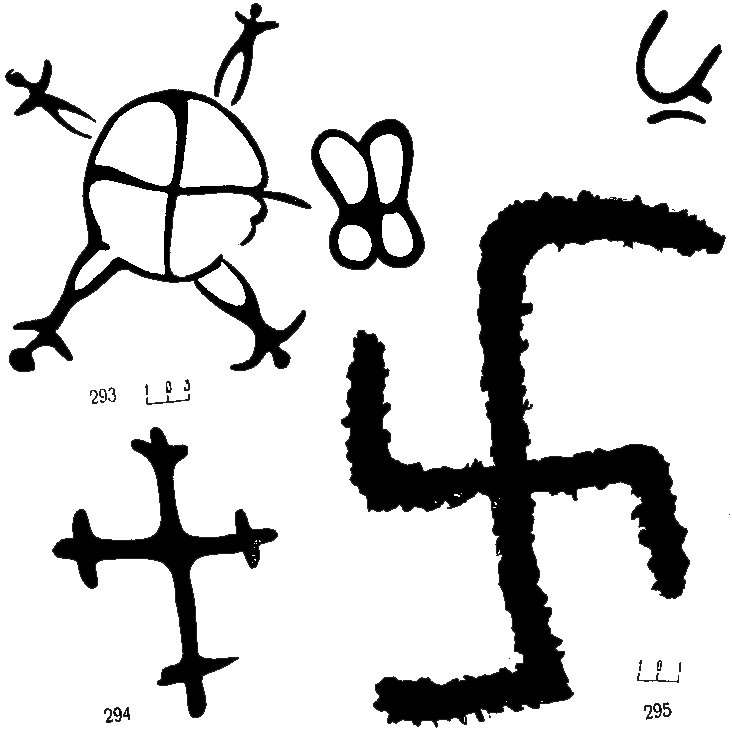
Gegham mountains petroglyph drawings

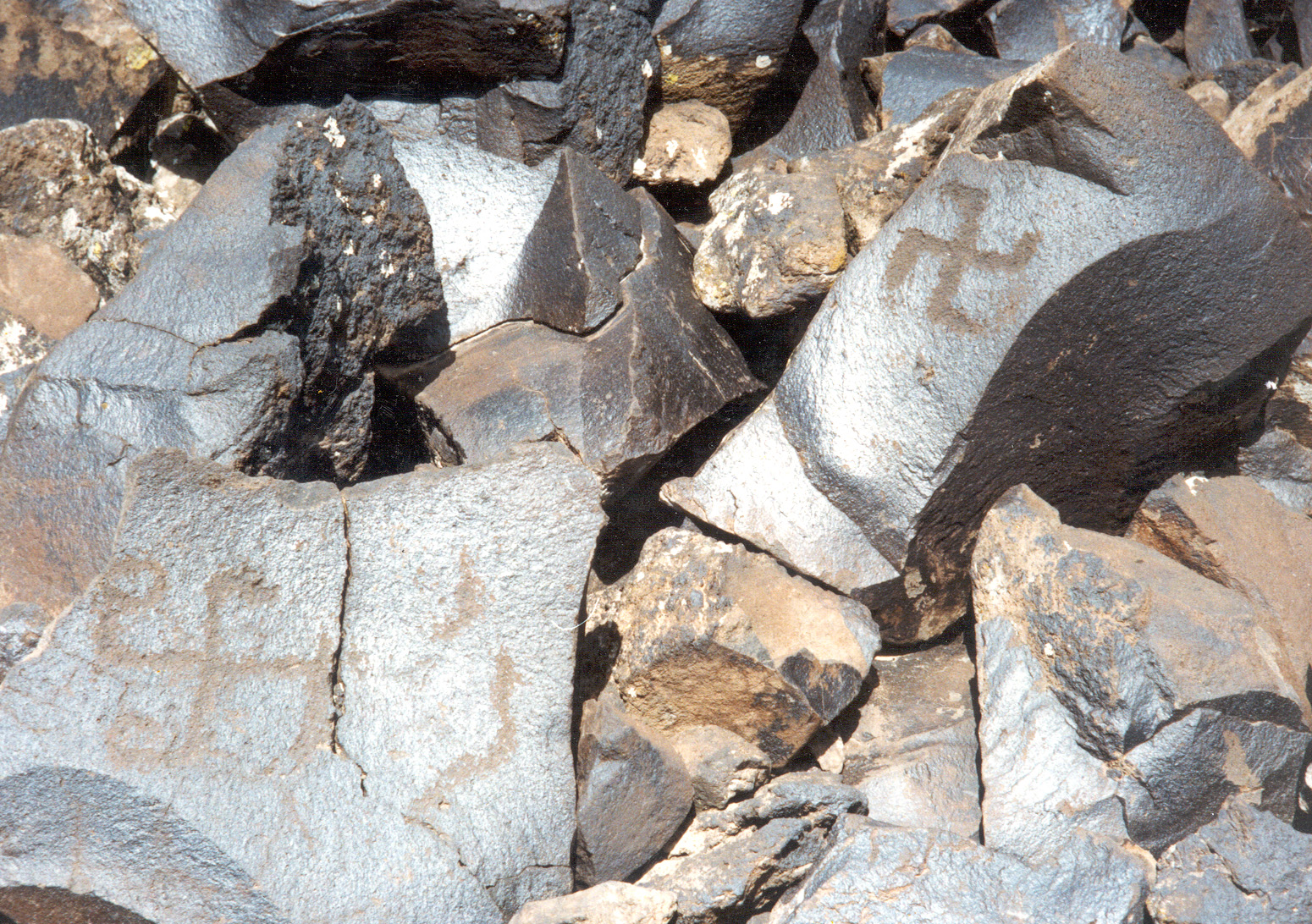

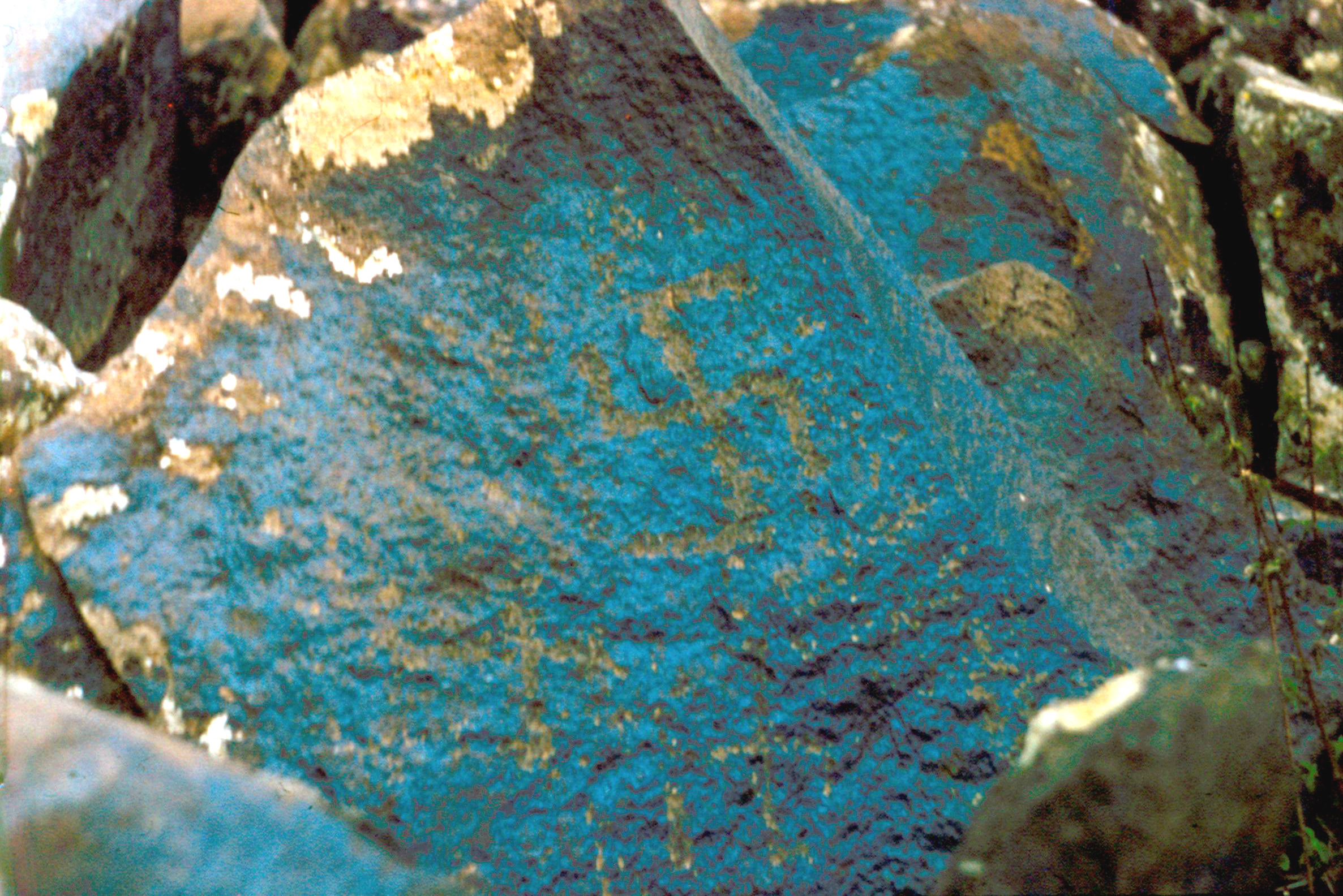
petroglyphs in the form of Swastika

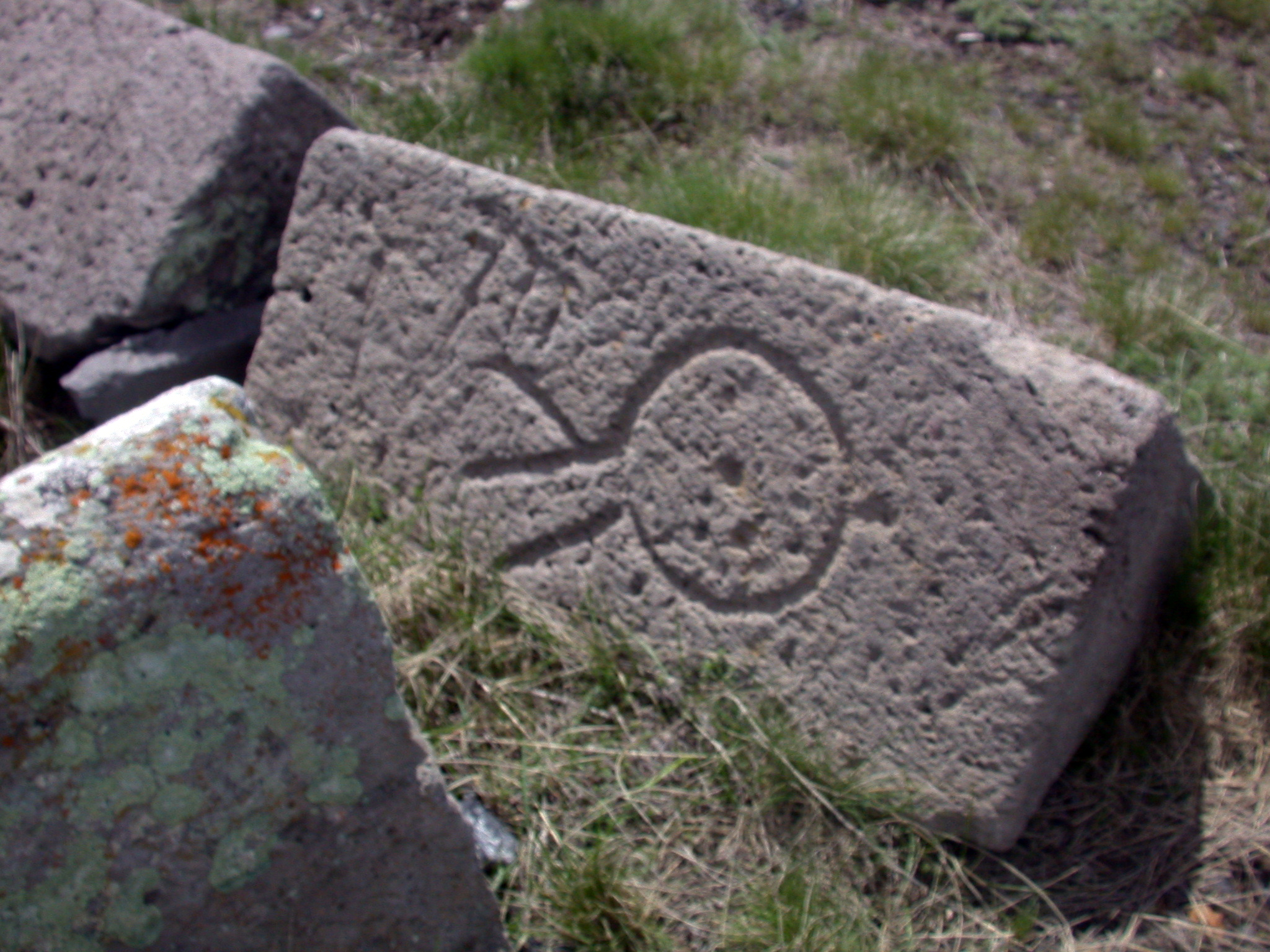

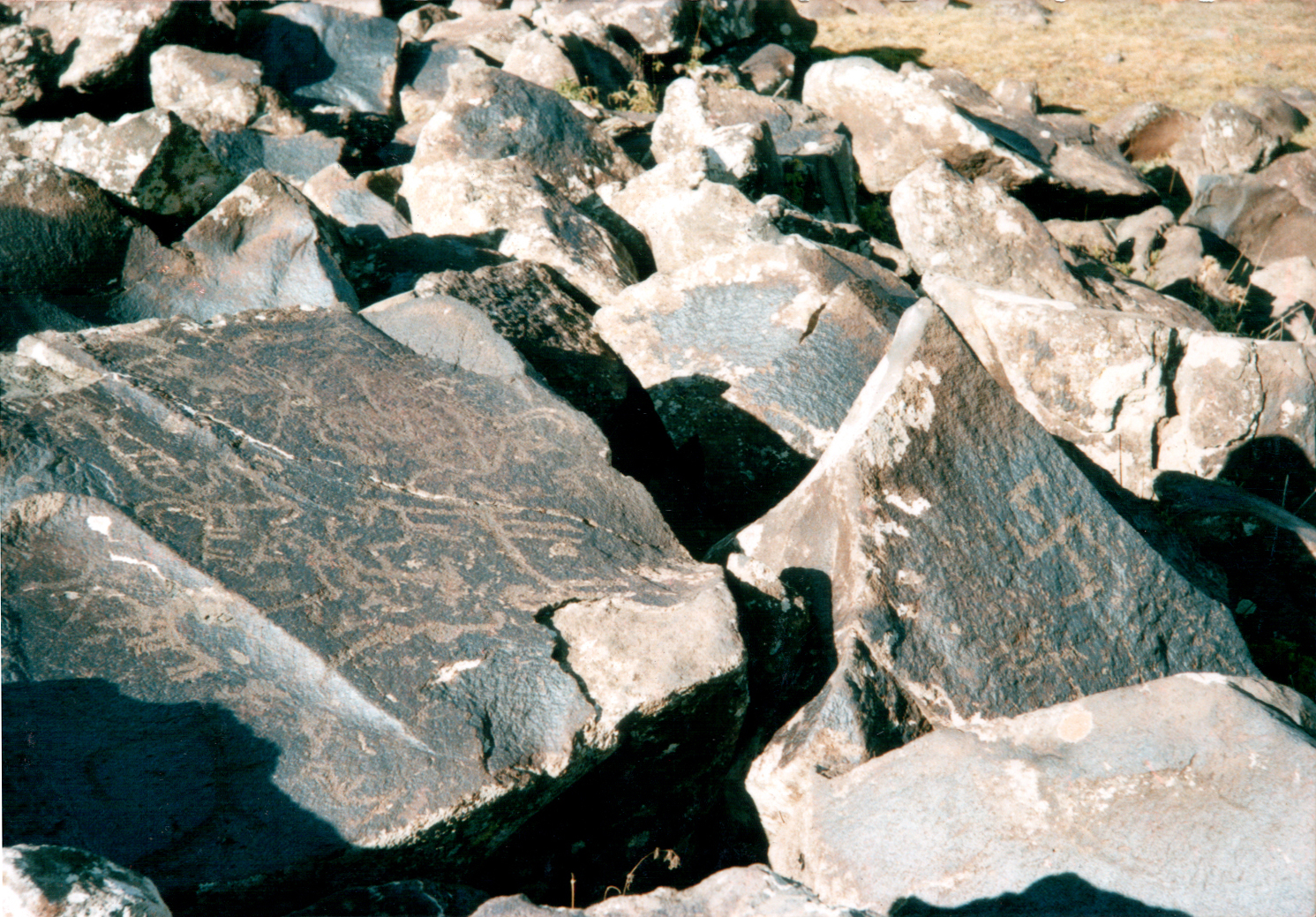

A great number of petroglyphs - rock-carvings has been found in the area of Gegham Mountains. Most images depict men in scenes of hunting and fighting, and astronomical bodies and phenomena: the Sun, the Moon, constellations, the stellar sky, lightning, etc. Carvings of birds have attracted some archeological interest.

== Gallery ==
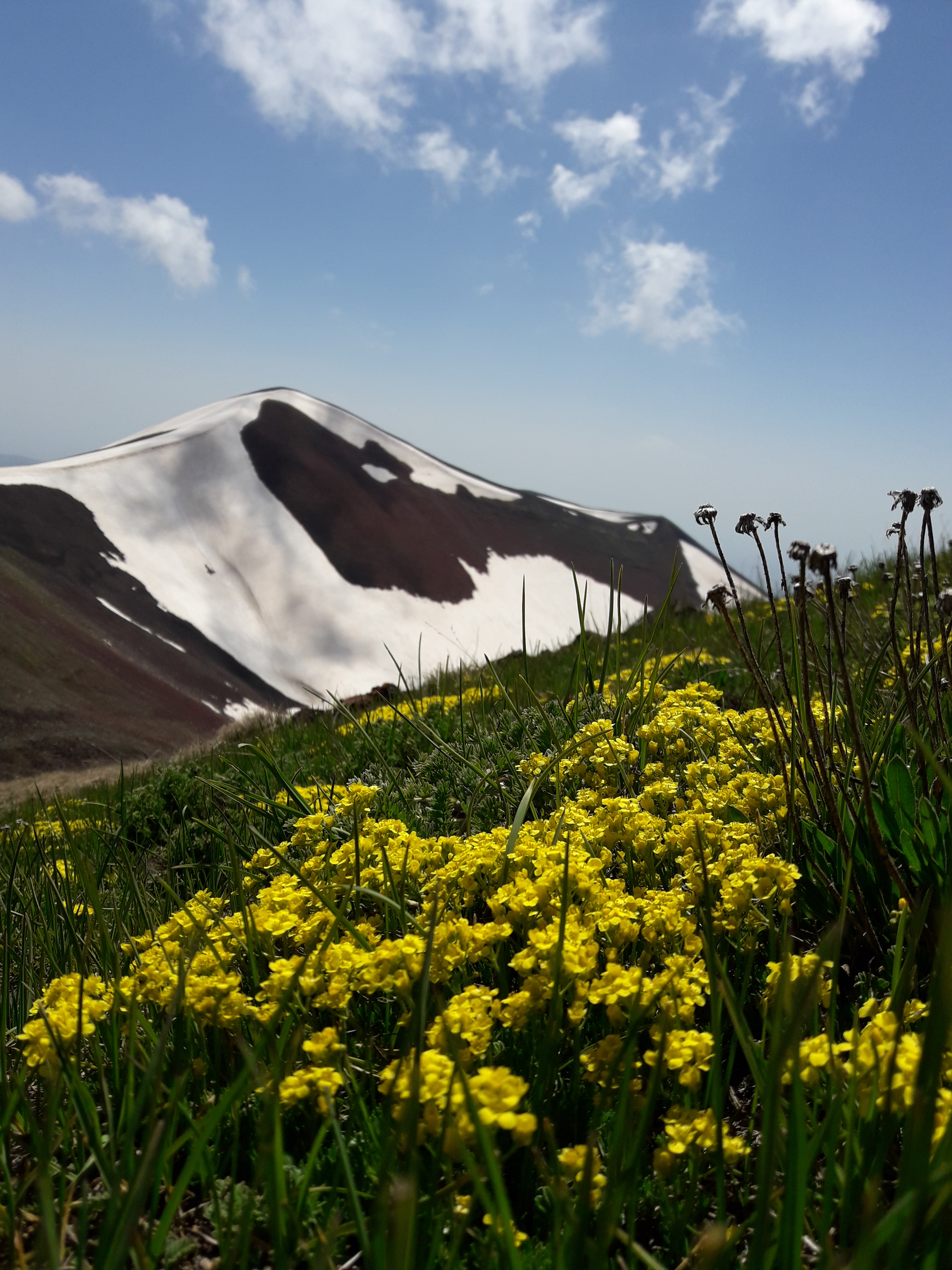

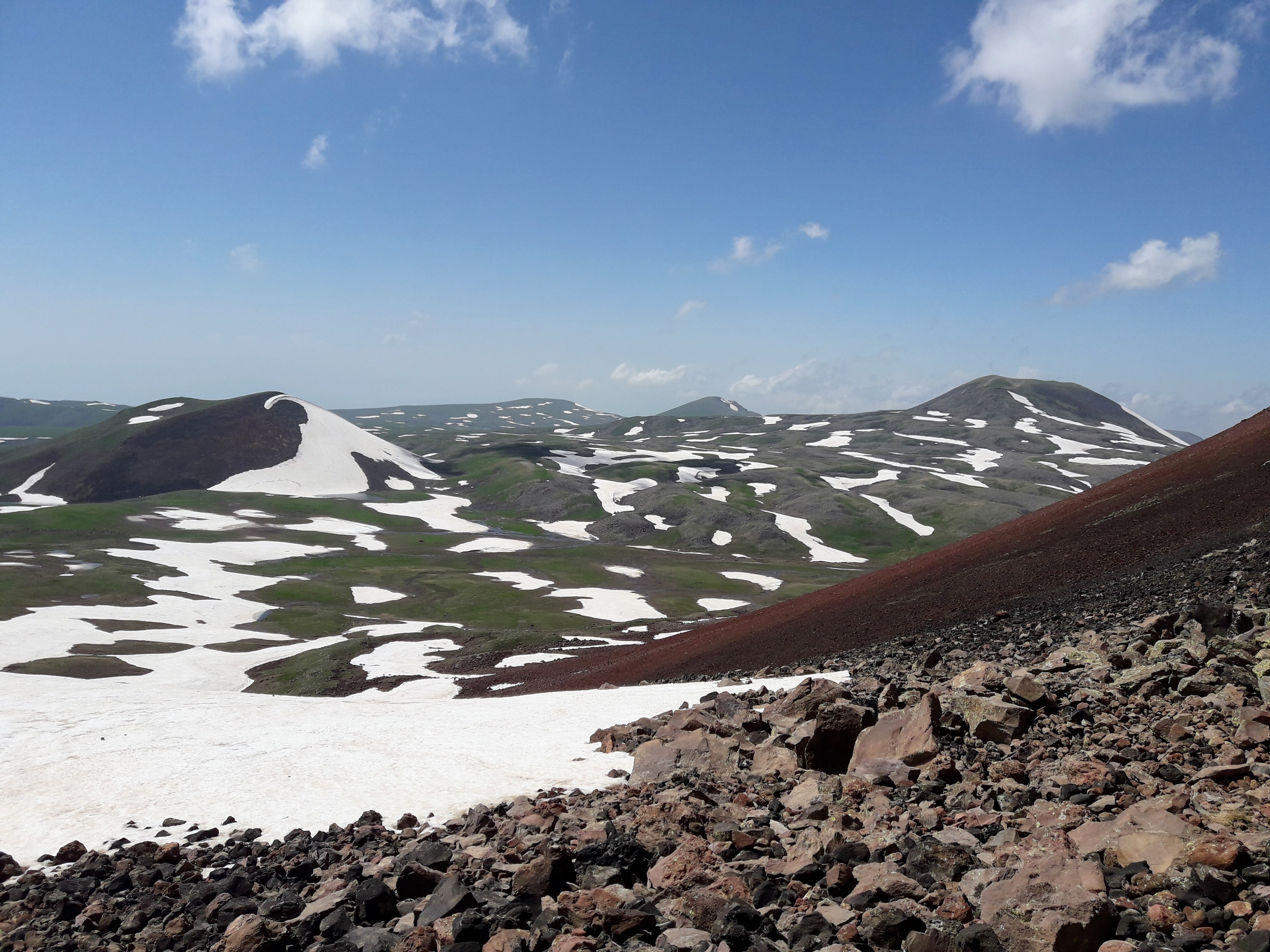

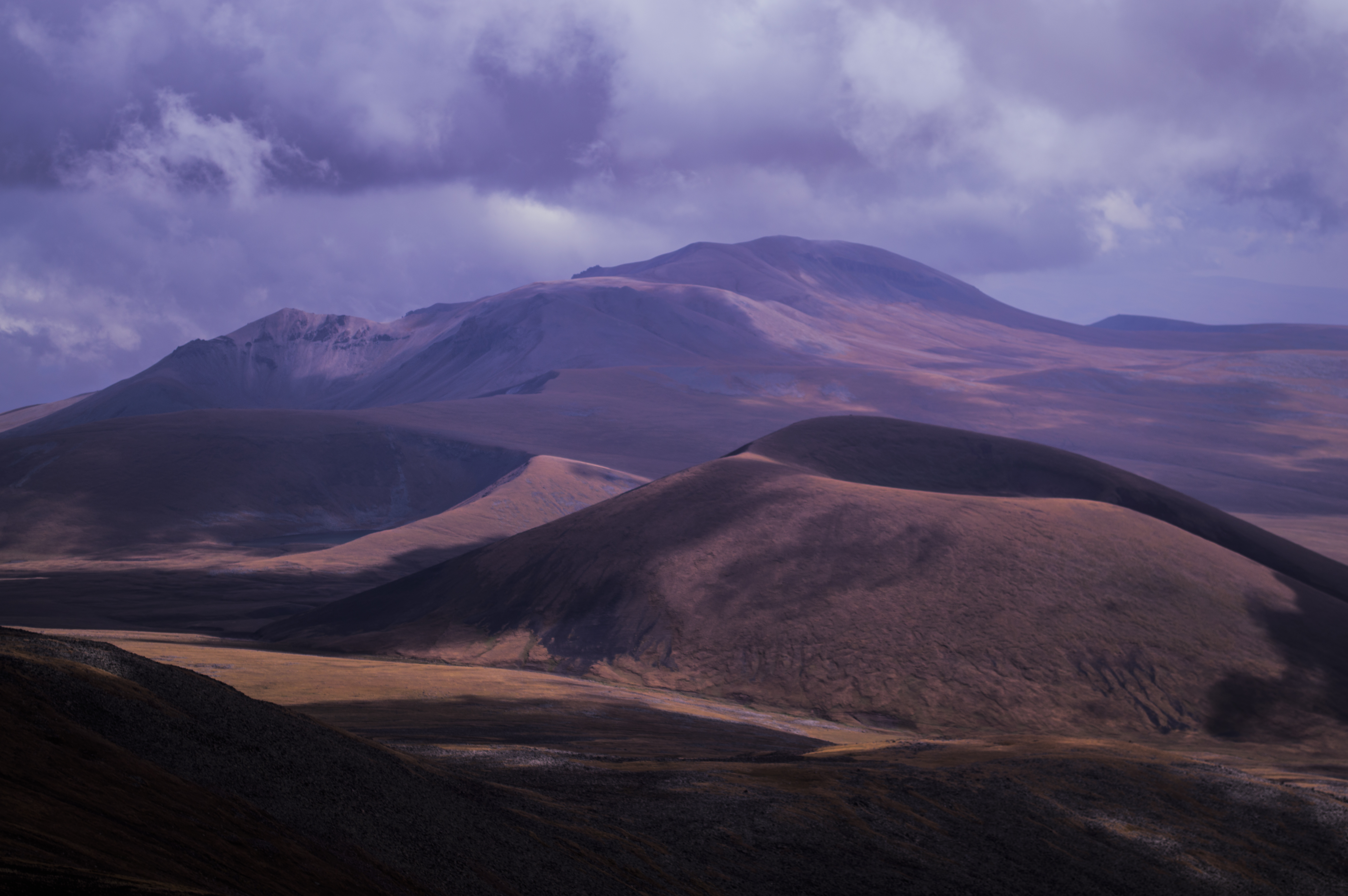

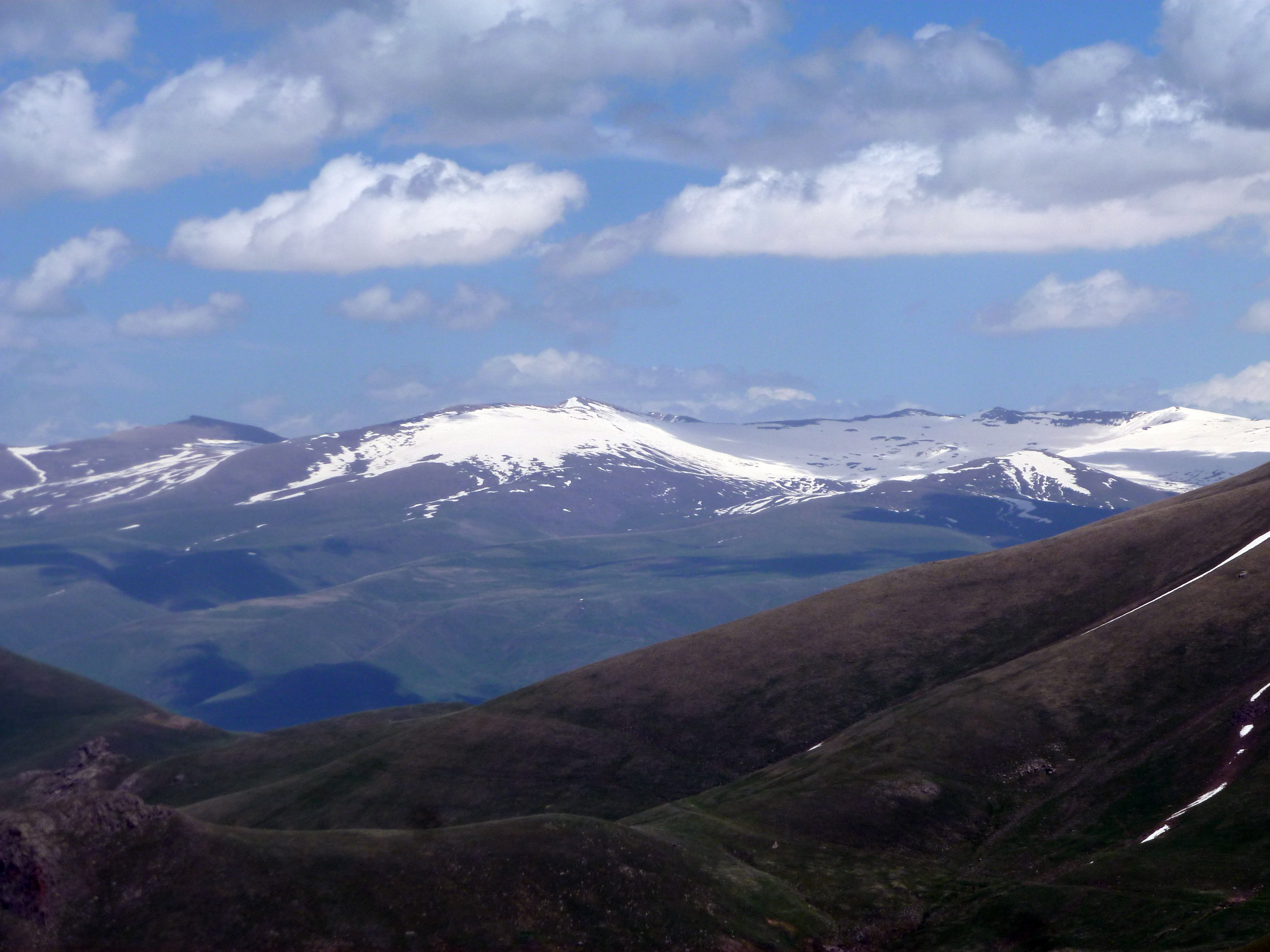

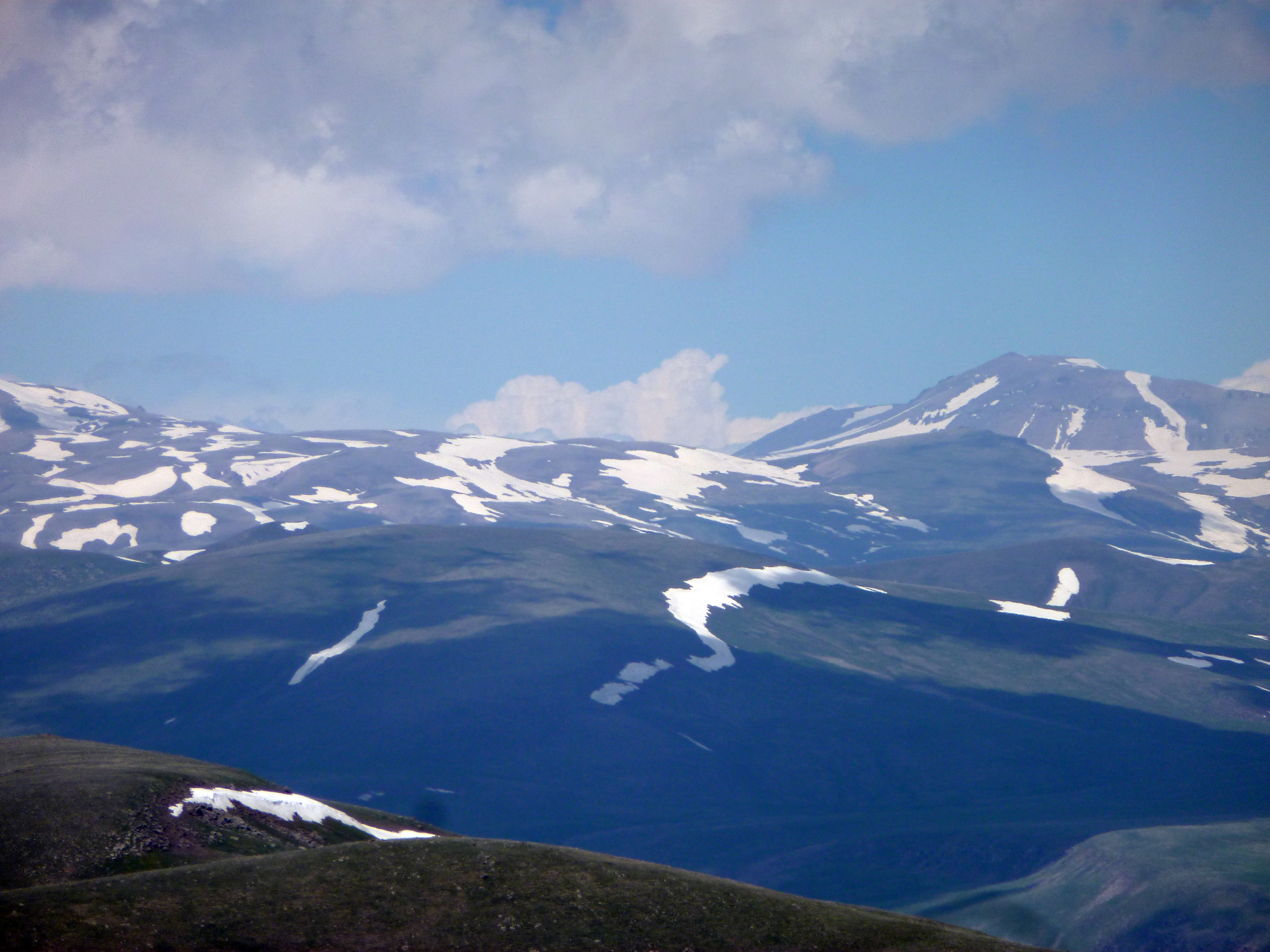

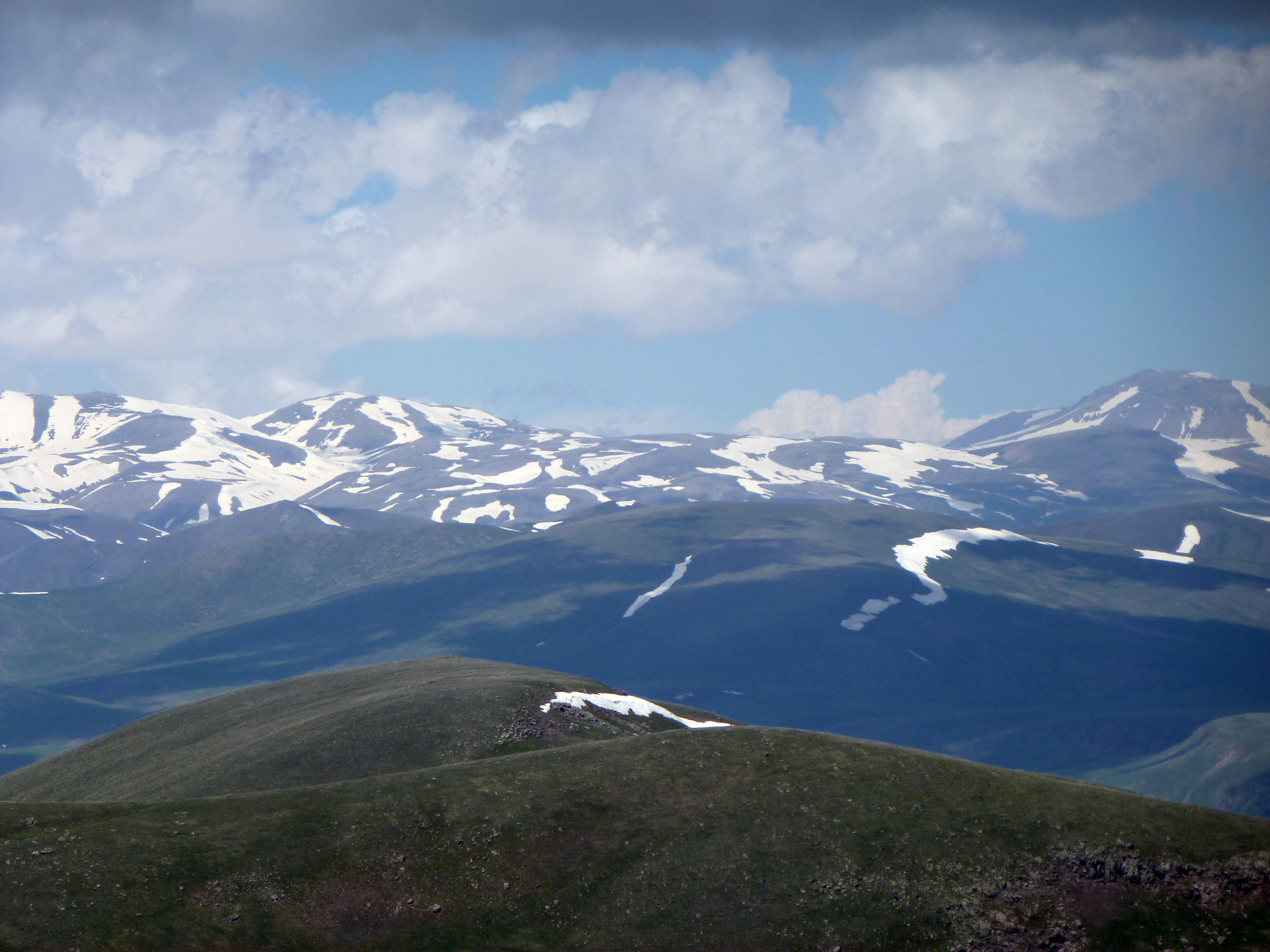

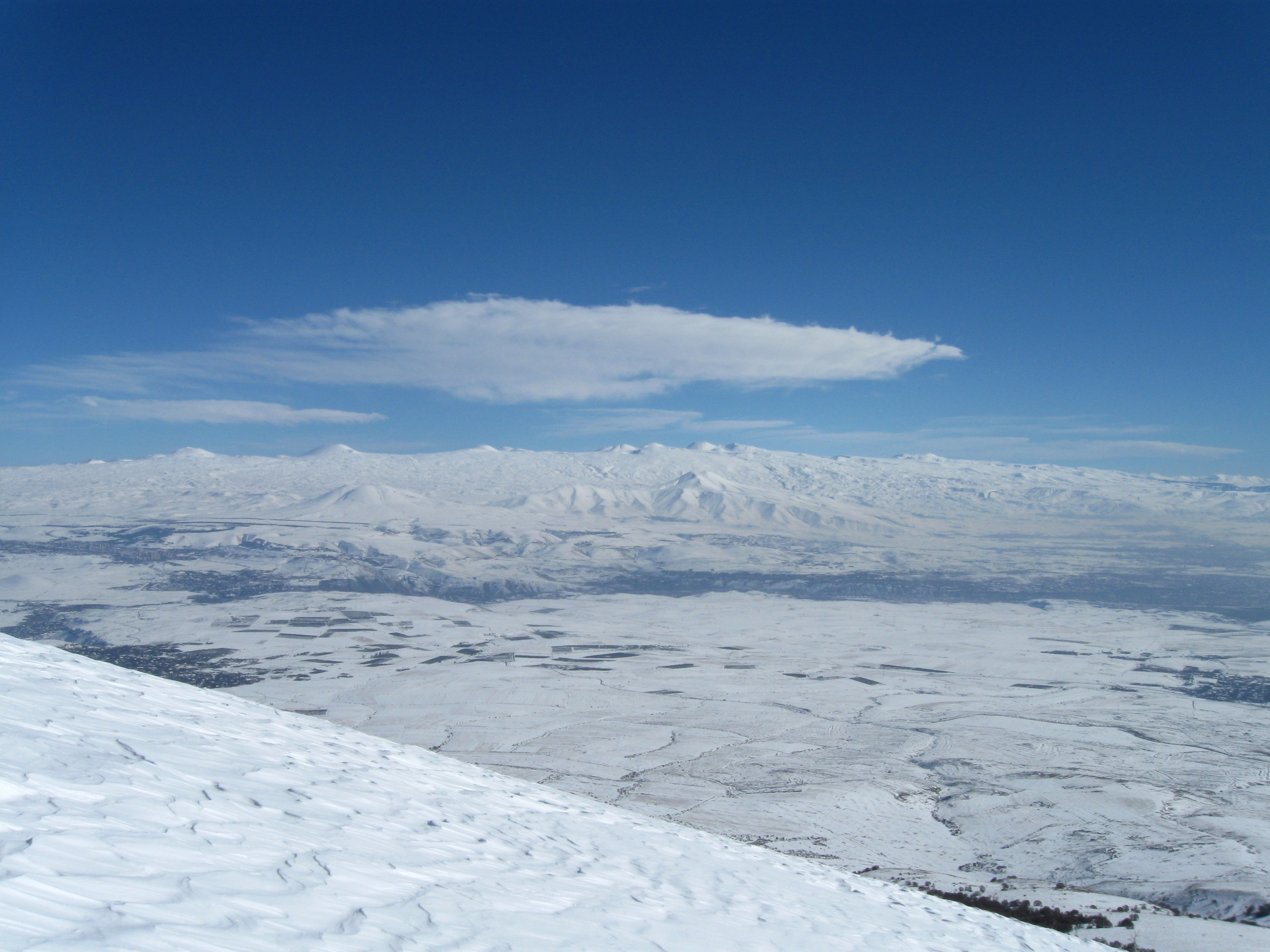
Armaghan

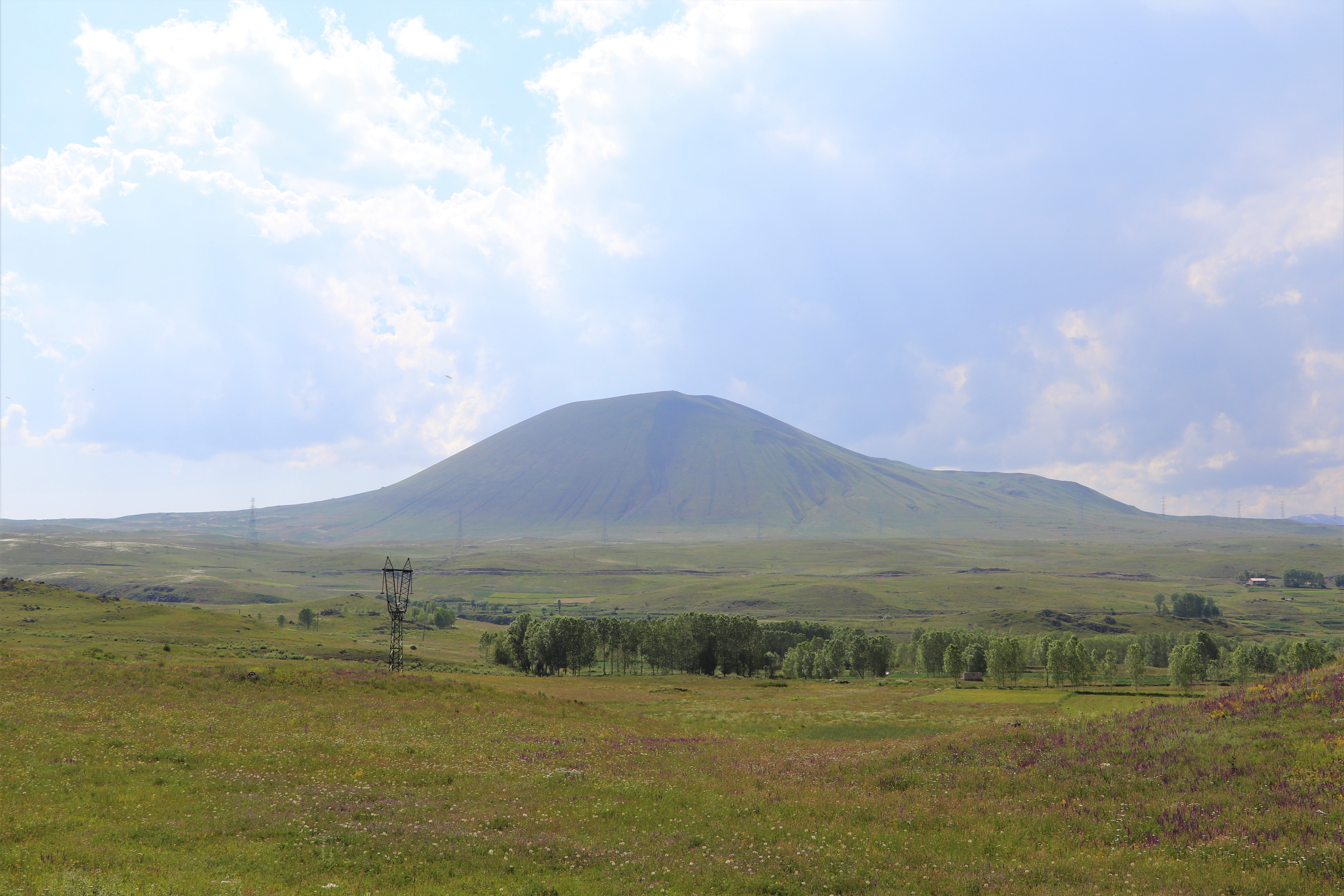

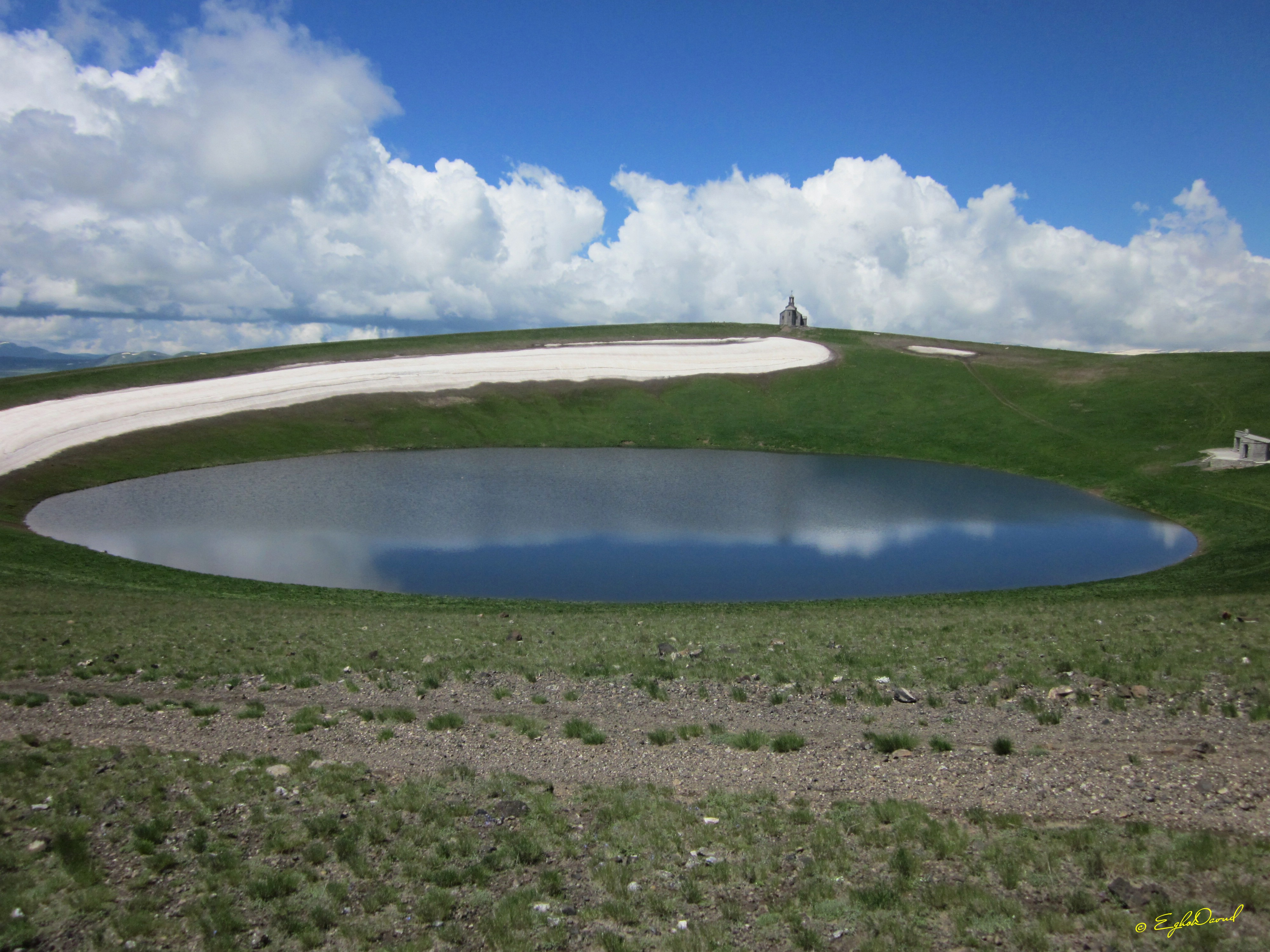
Azhdahak

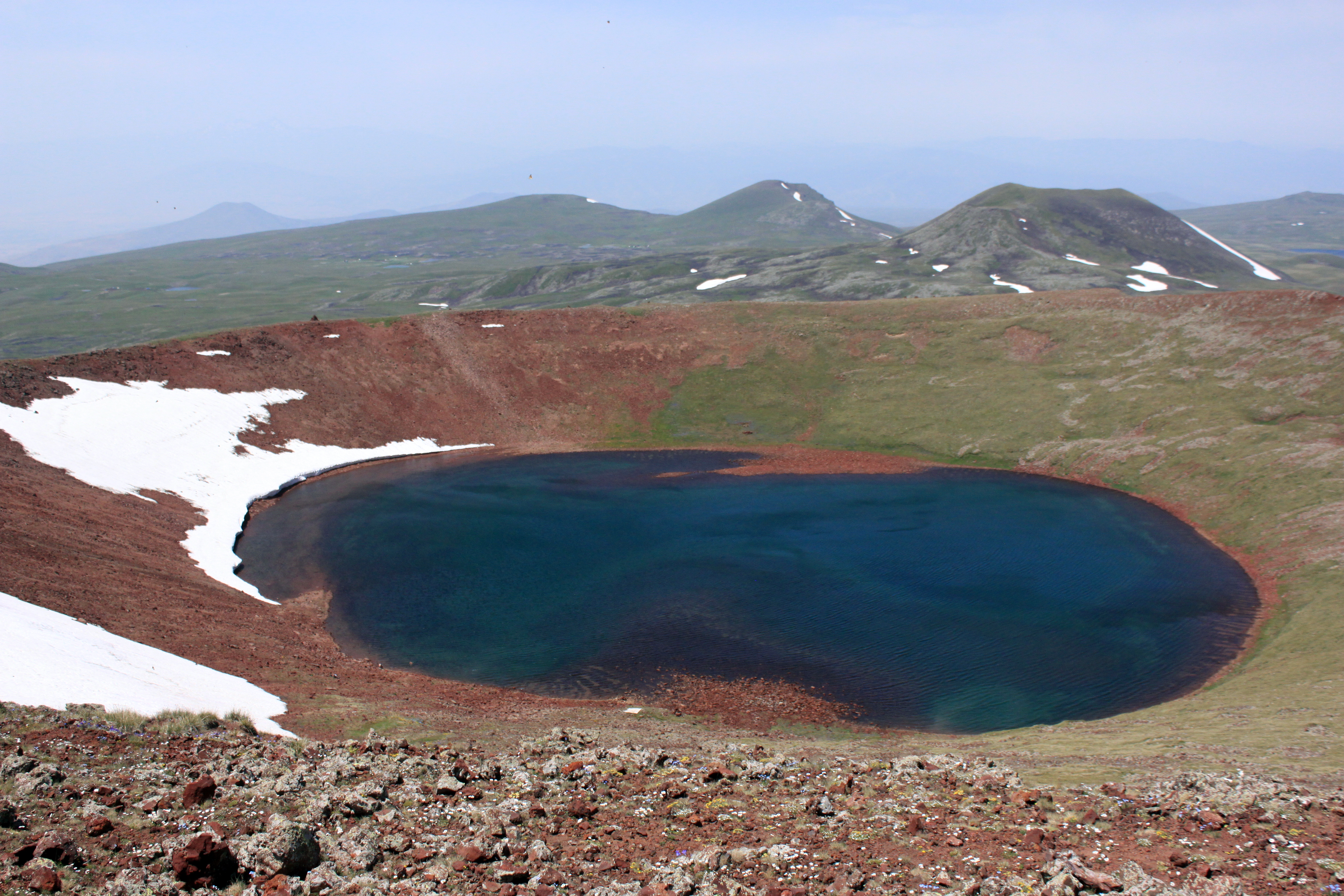

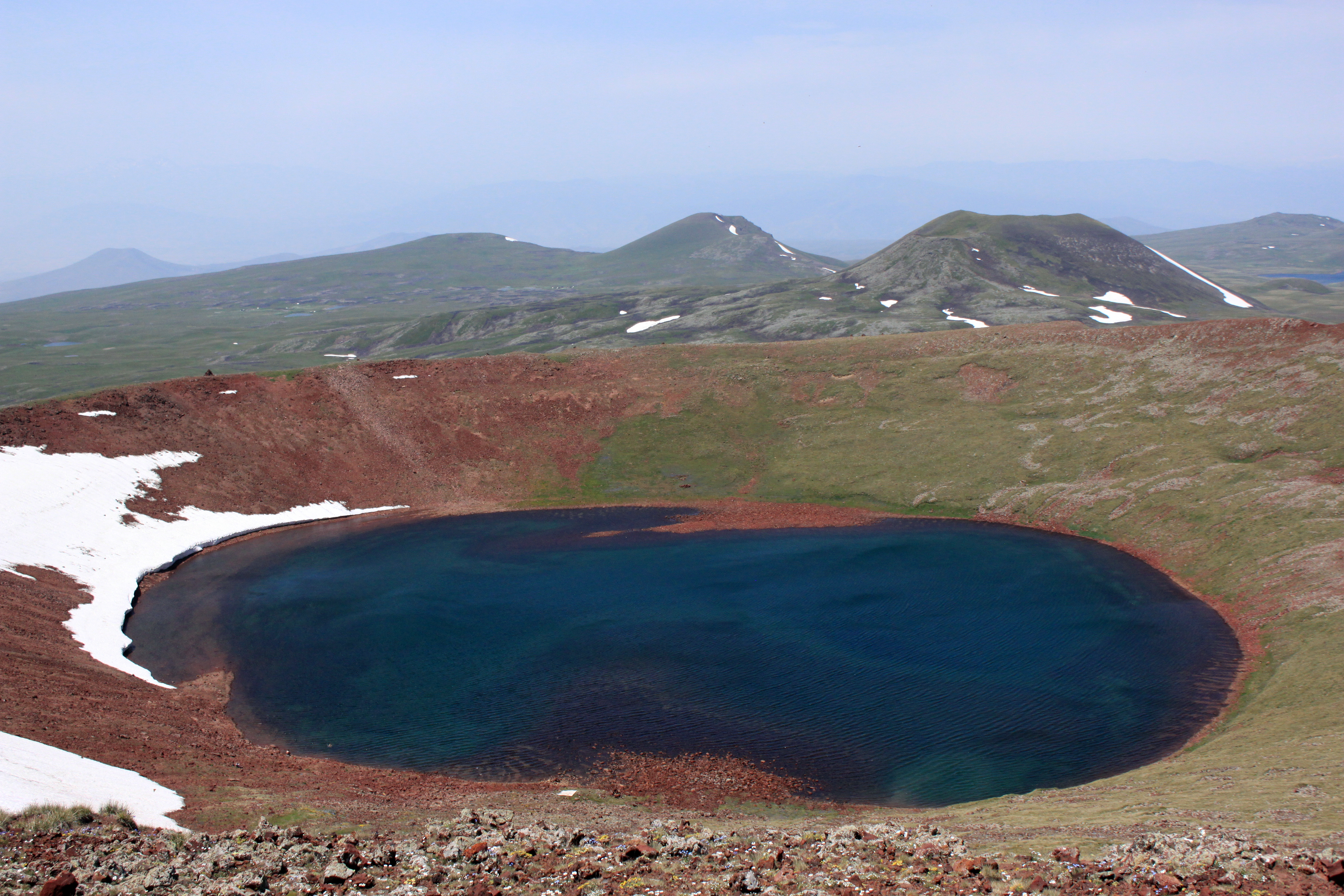

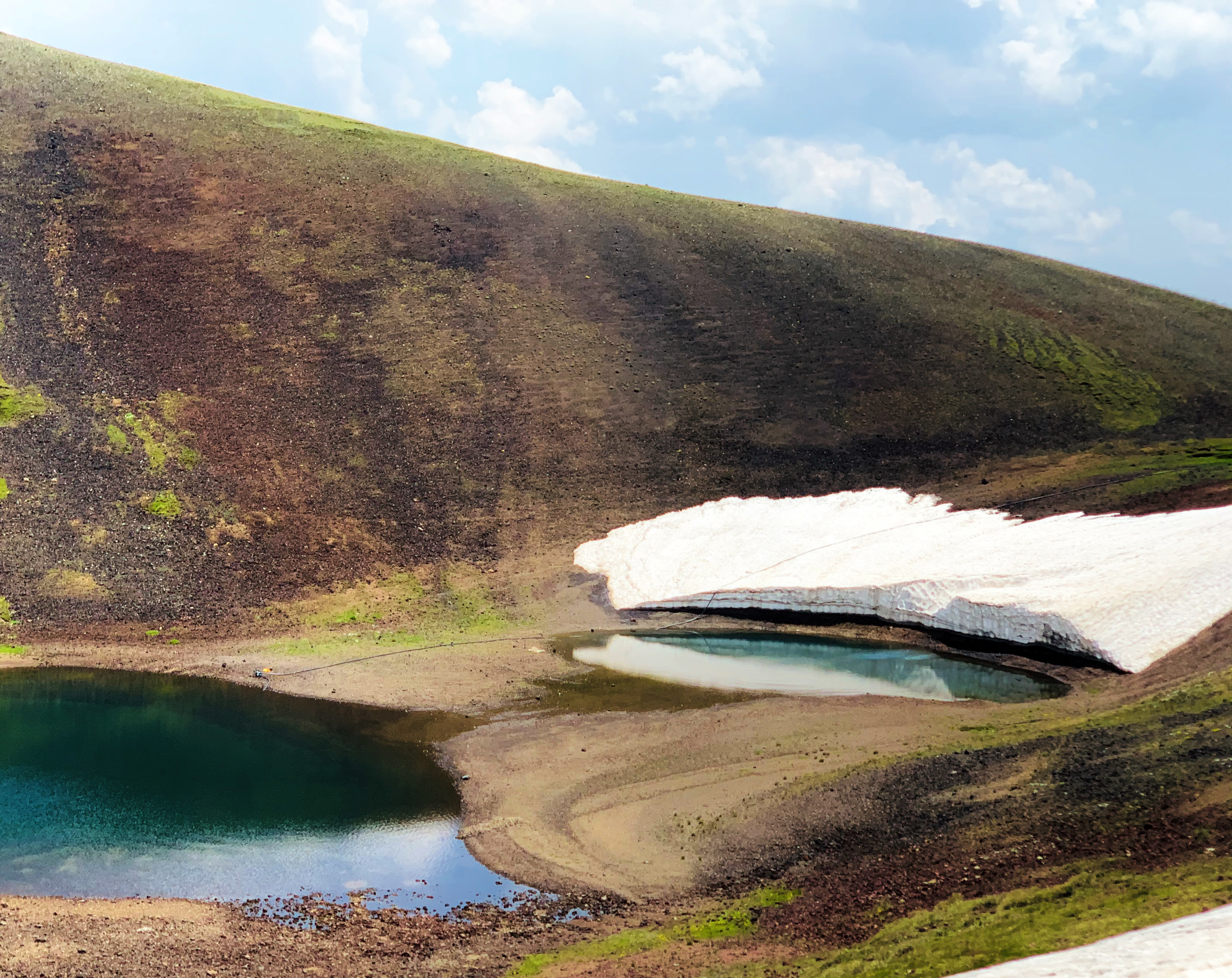

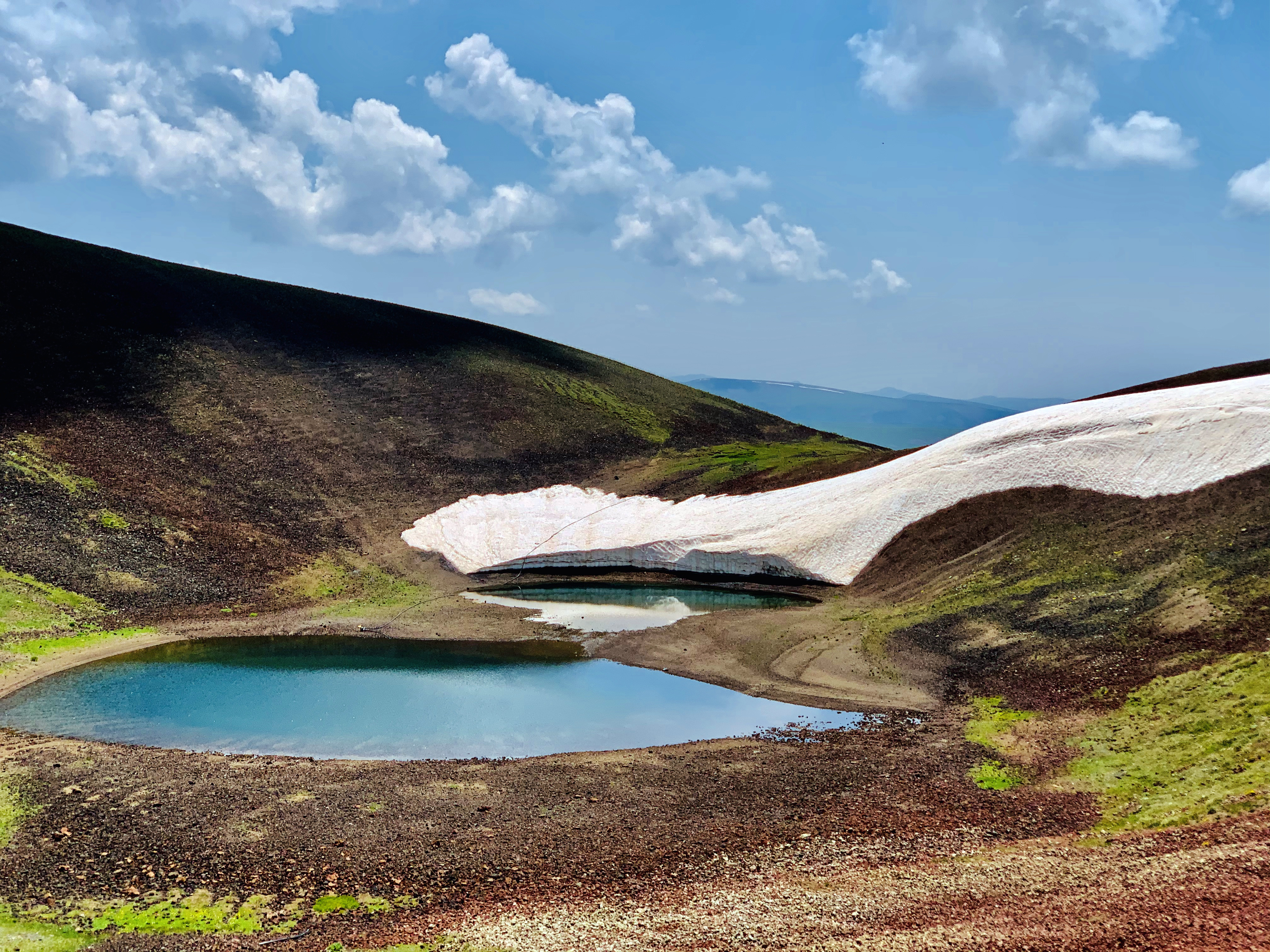
Gutanasar

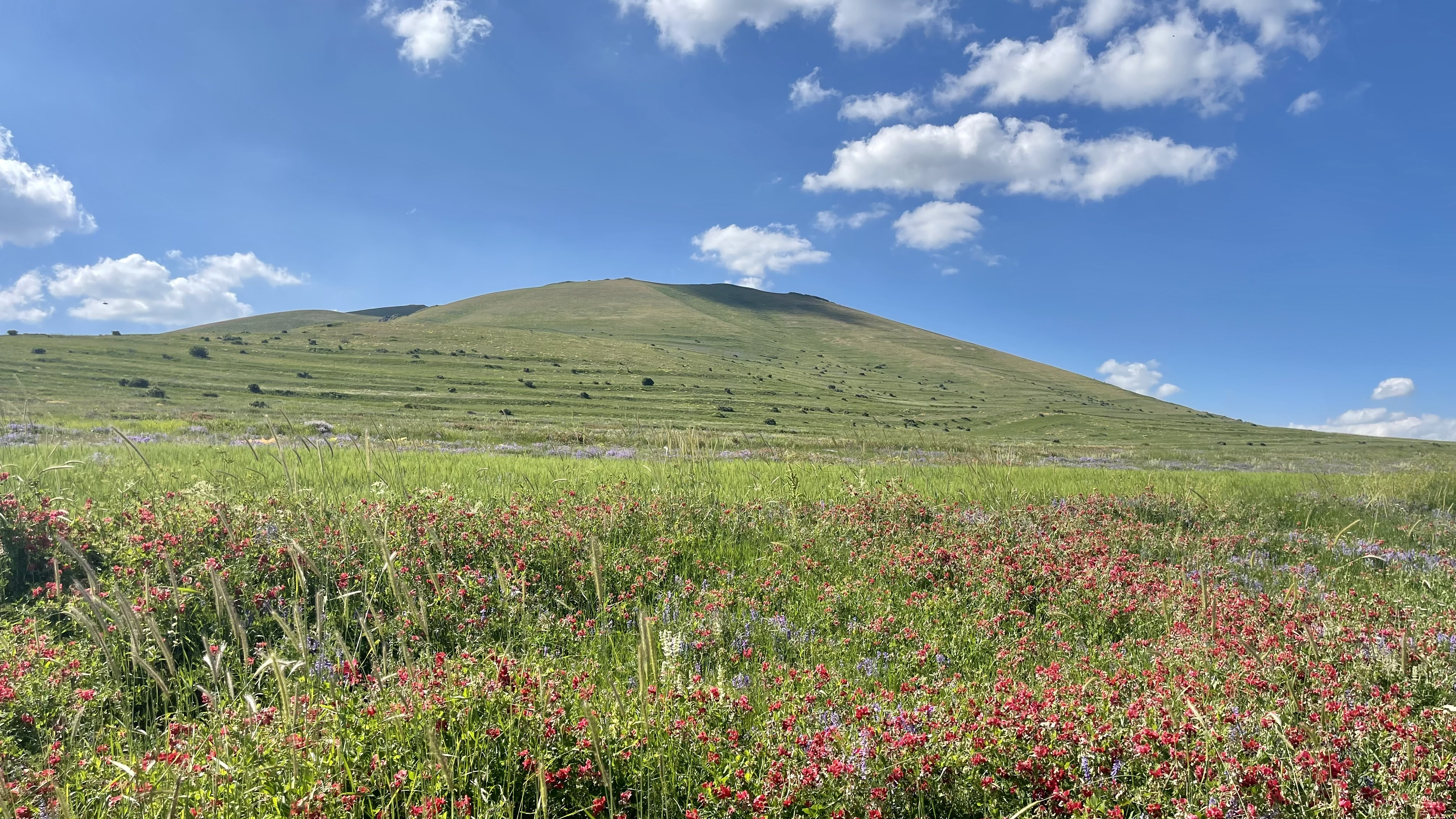

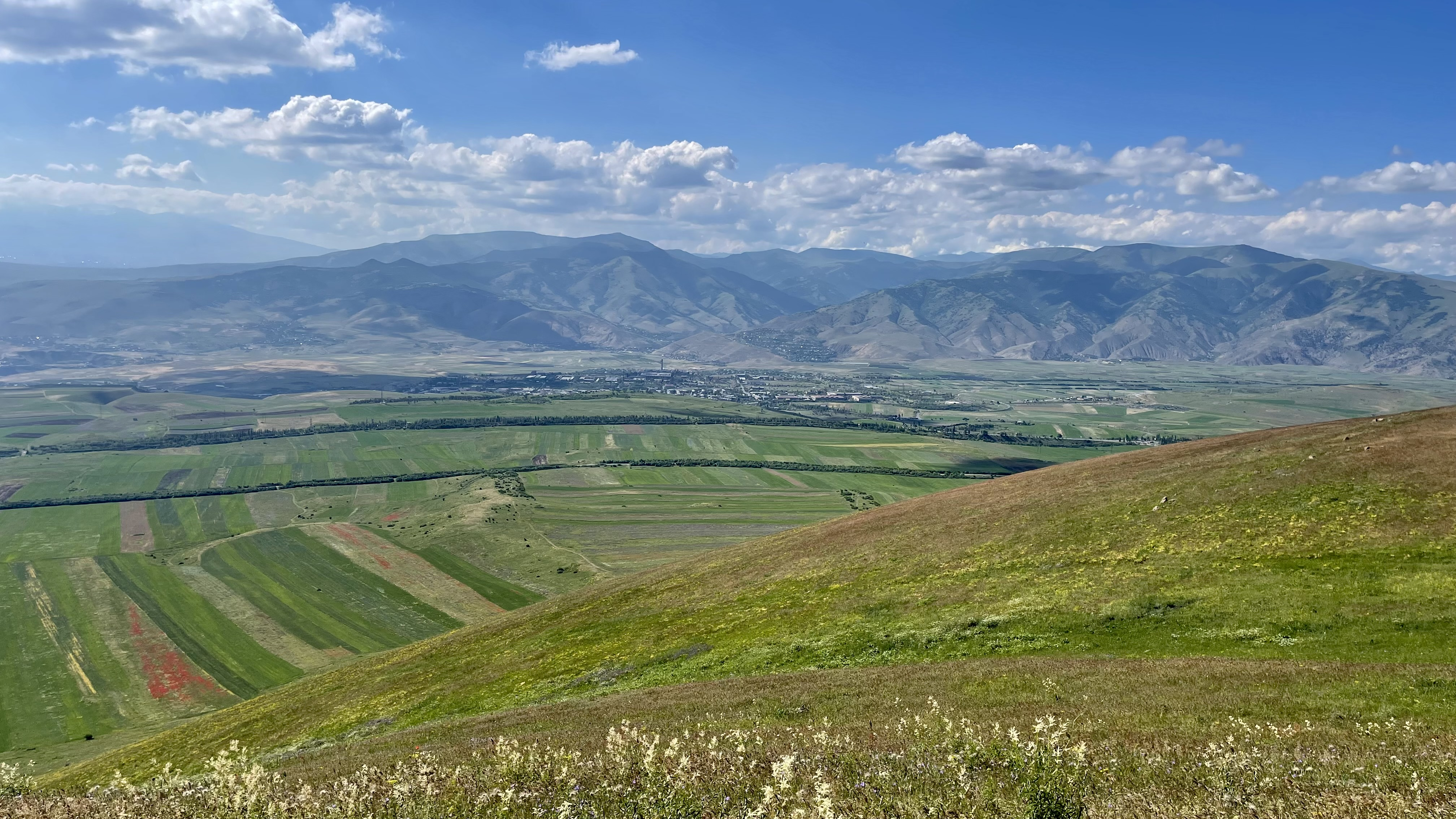

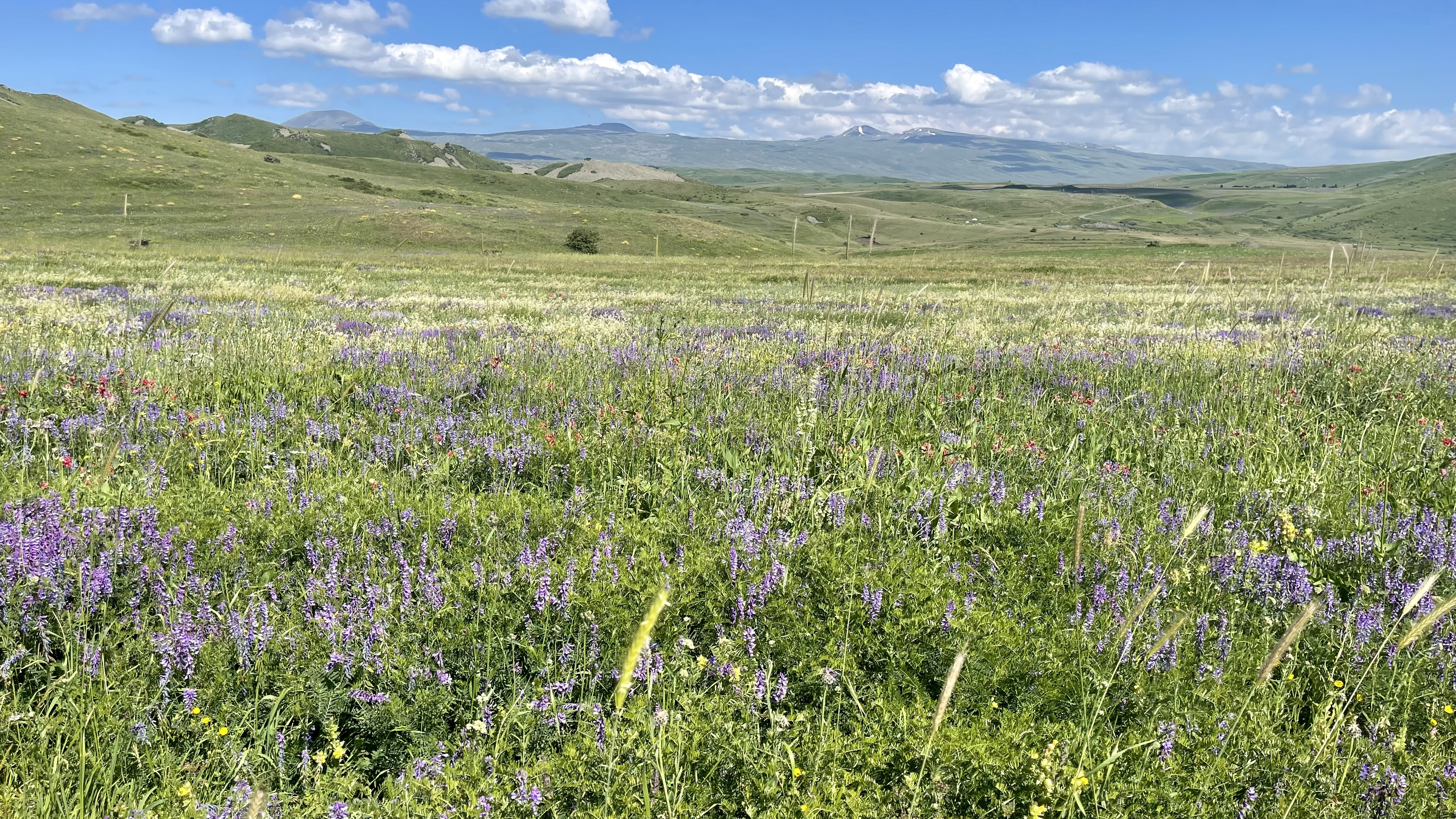

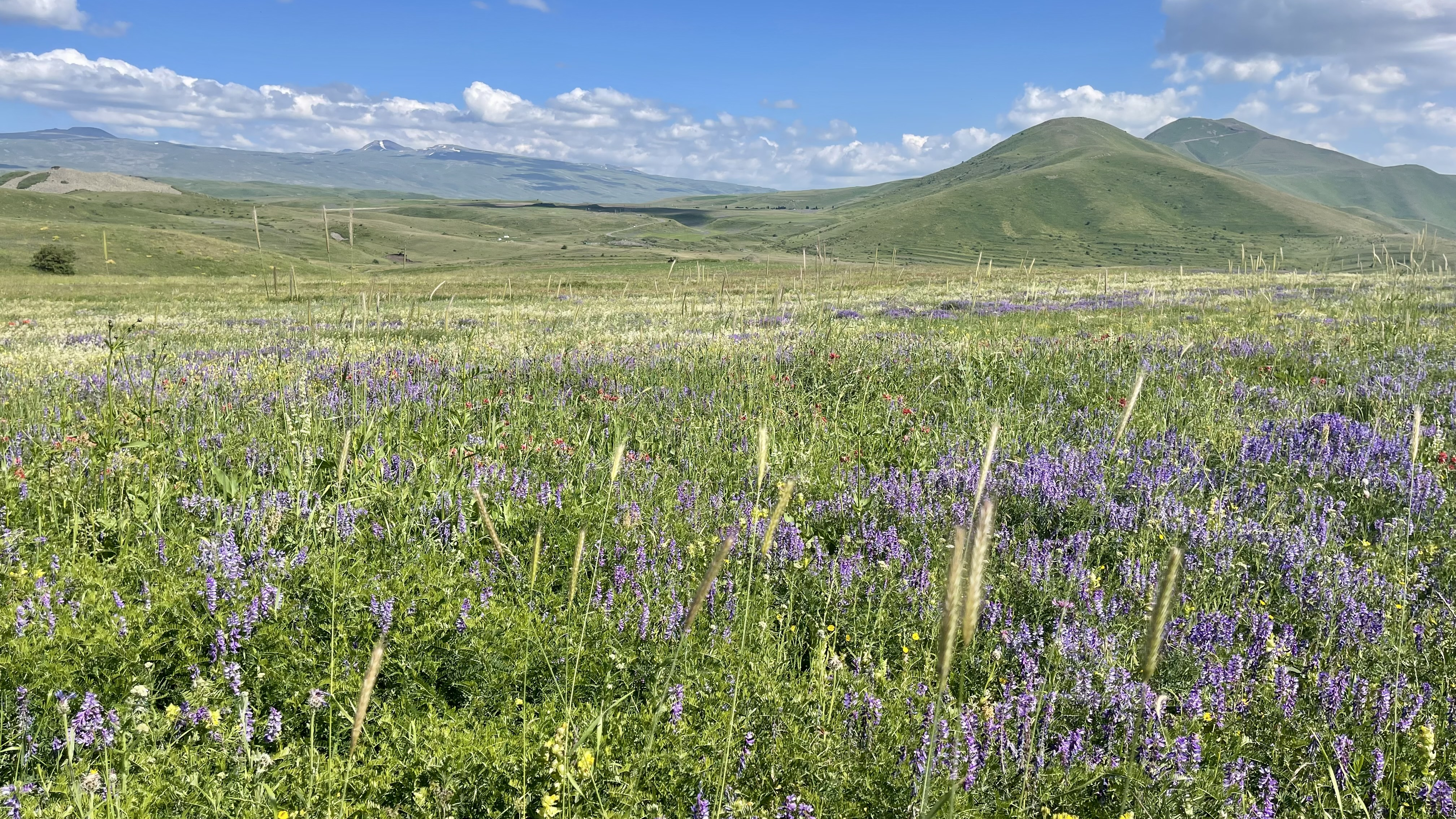

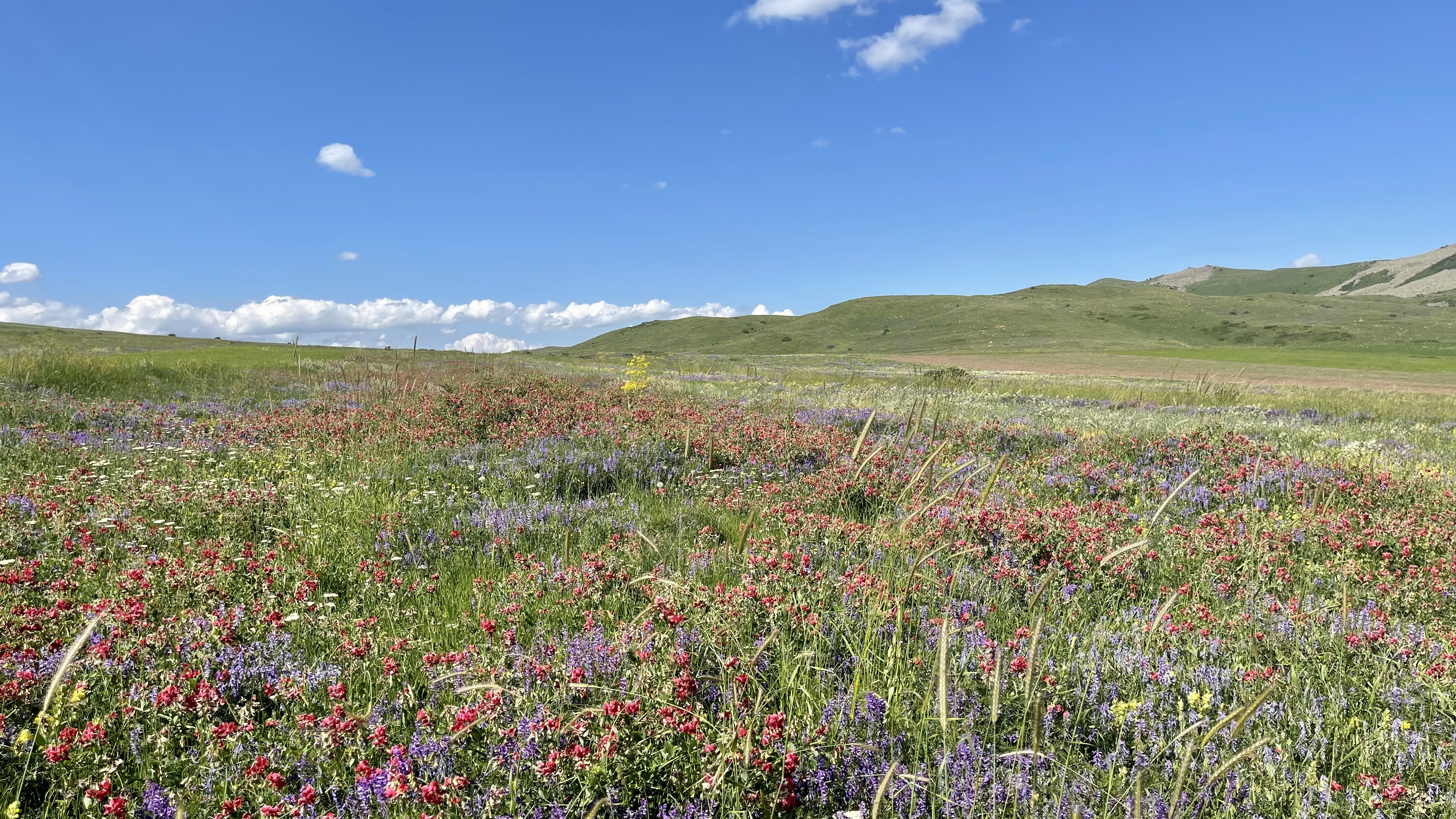

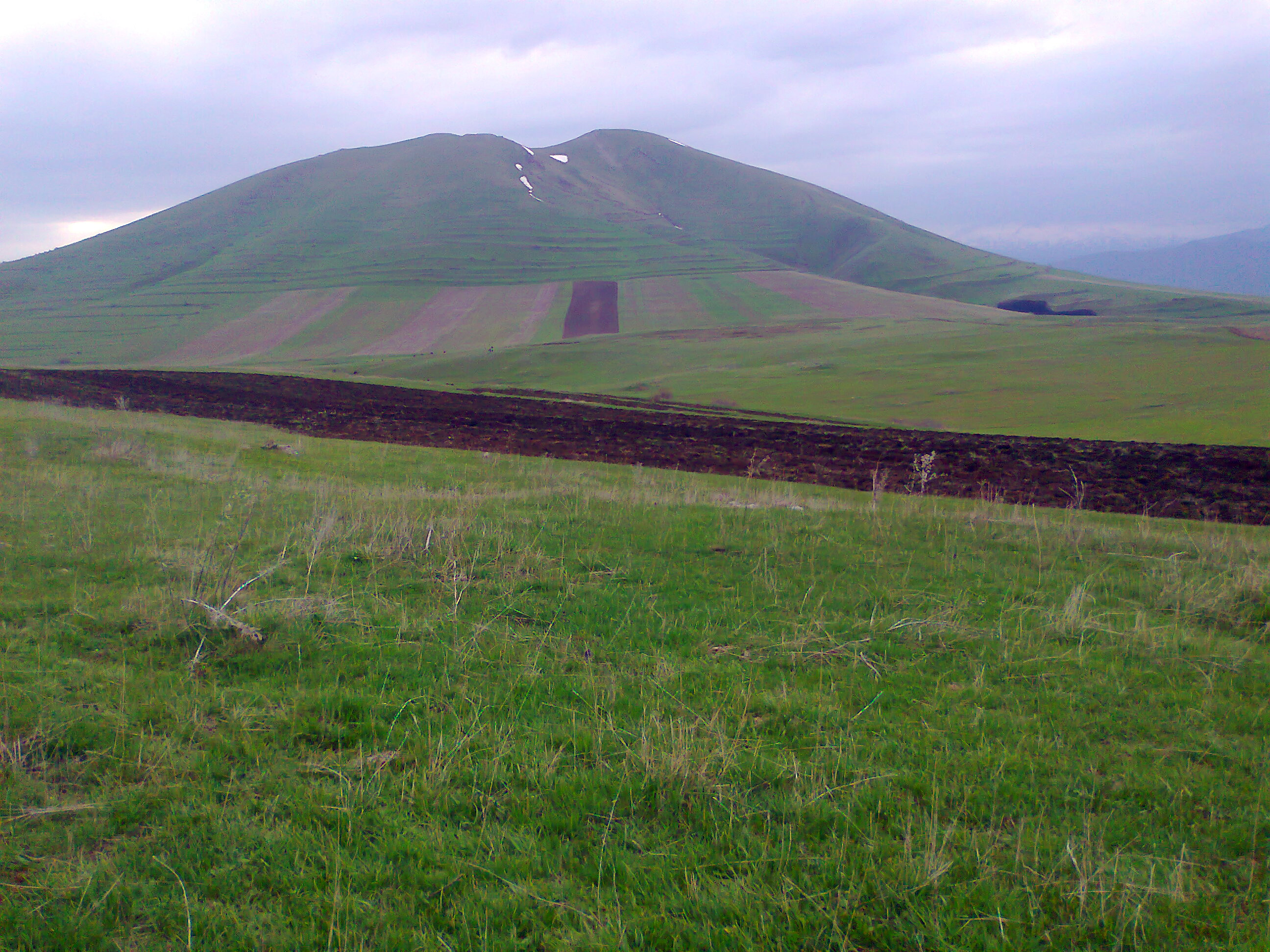

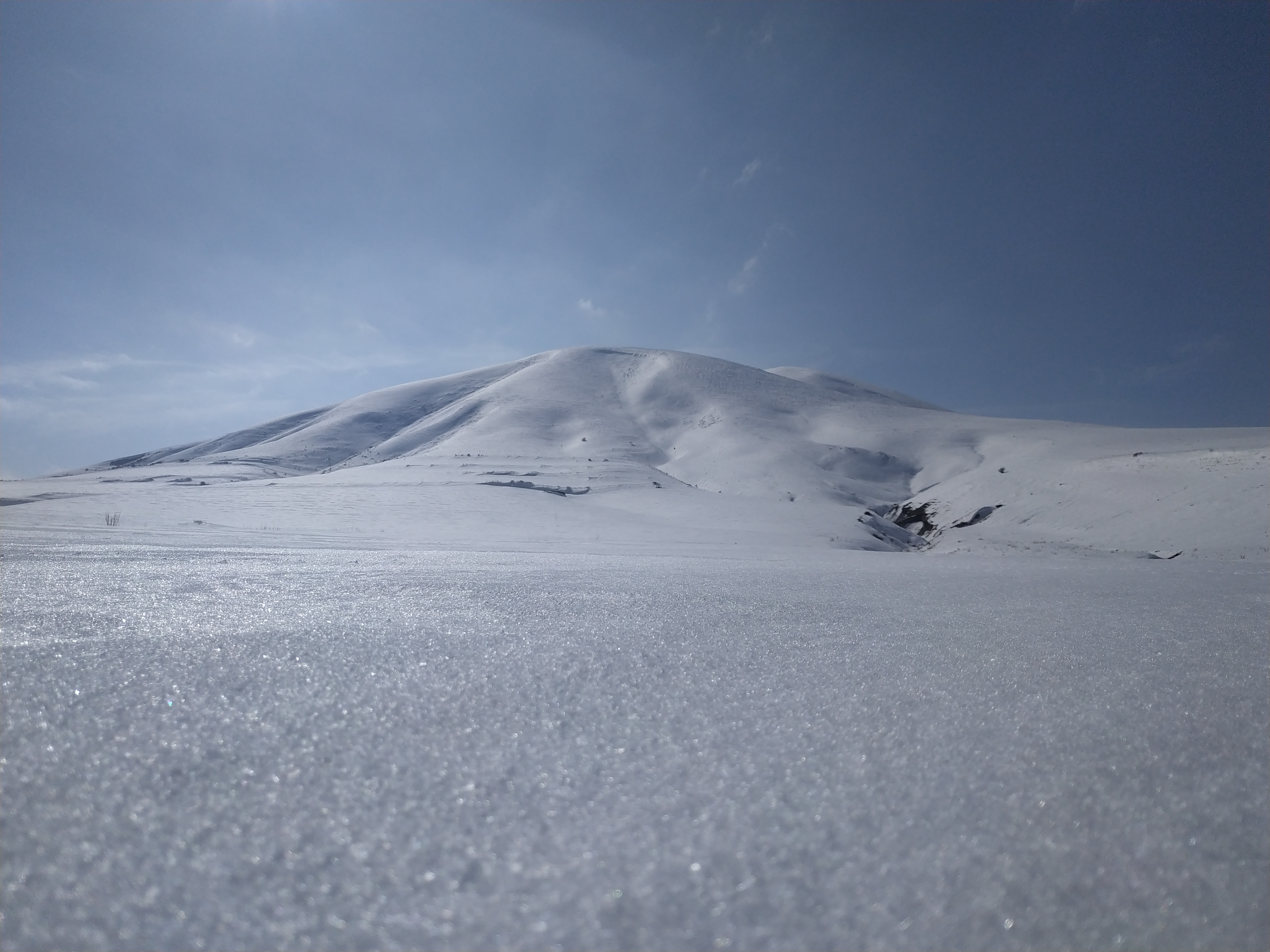
Gexasar

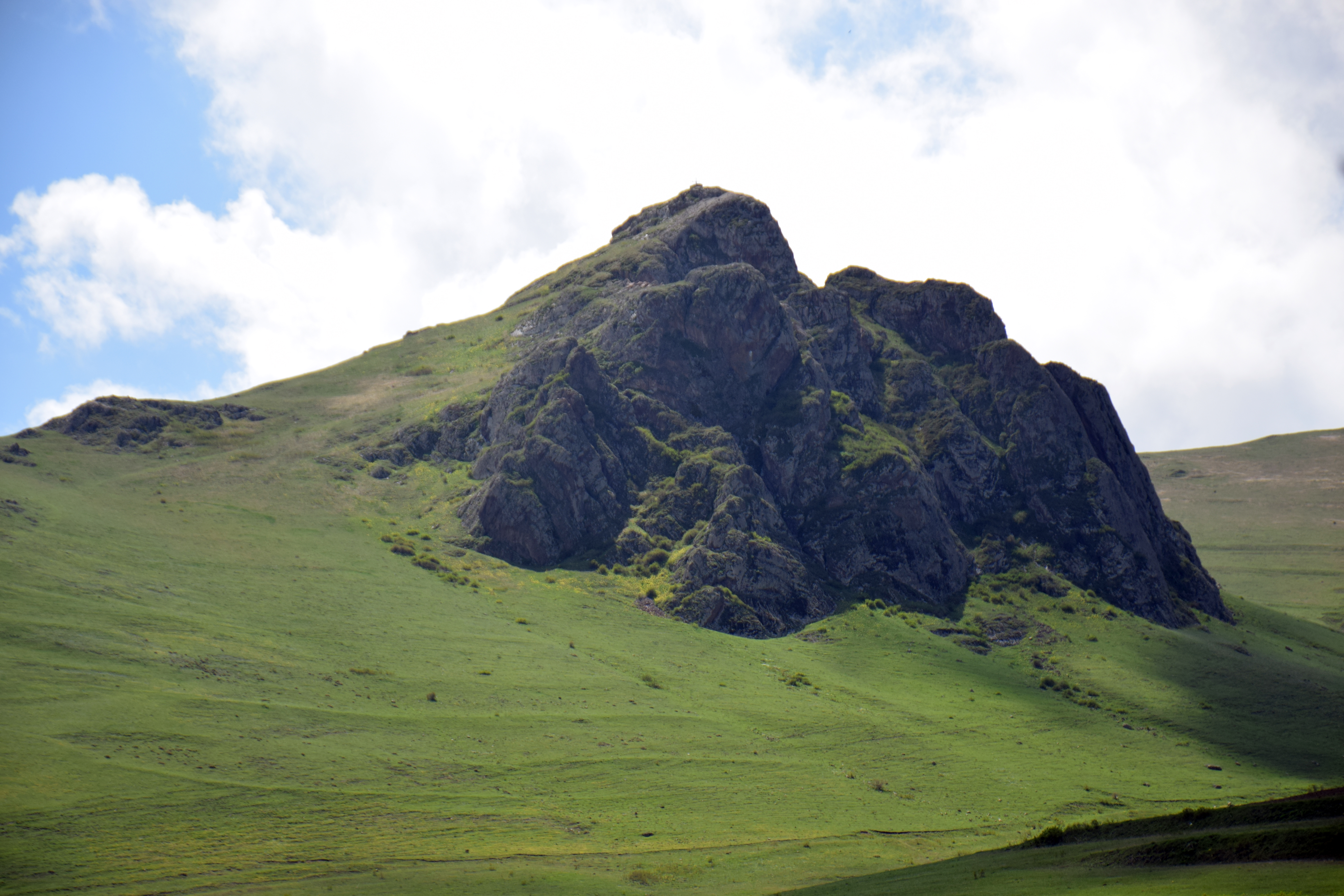

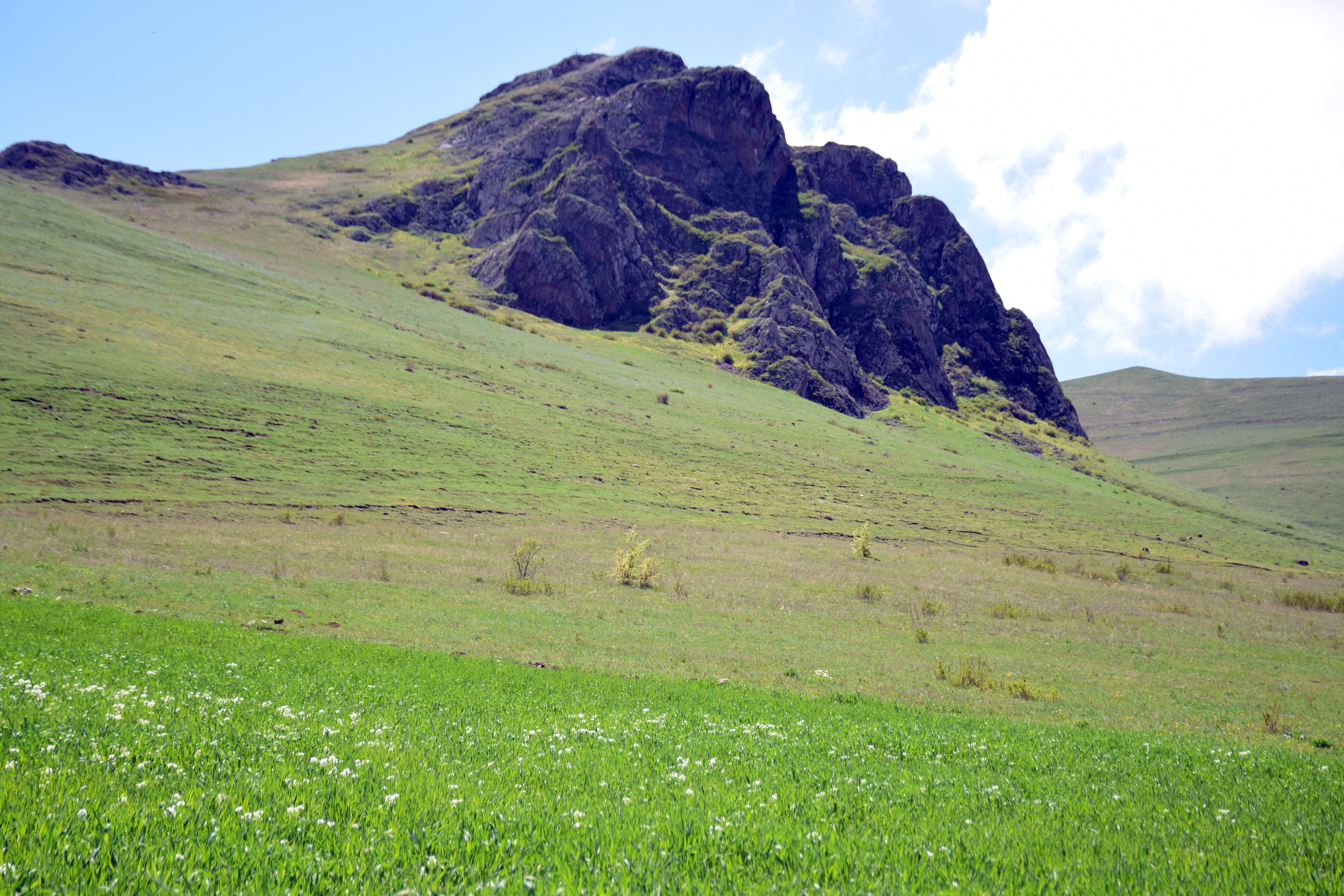

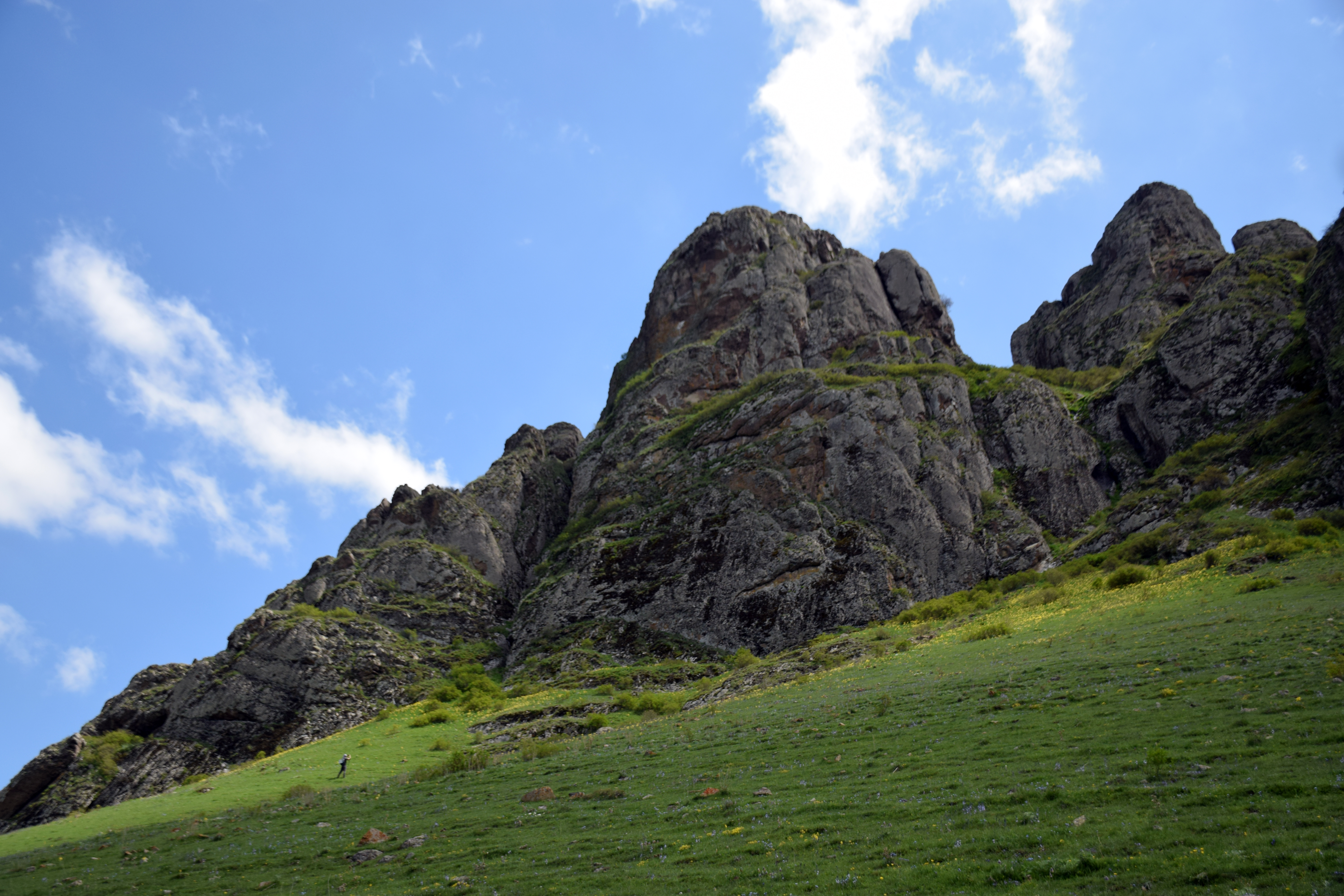

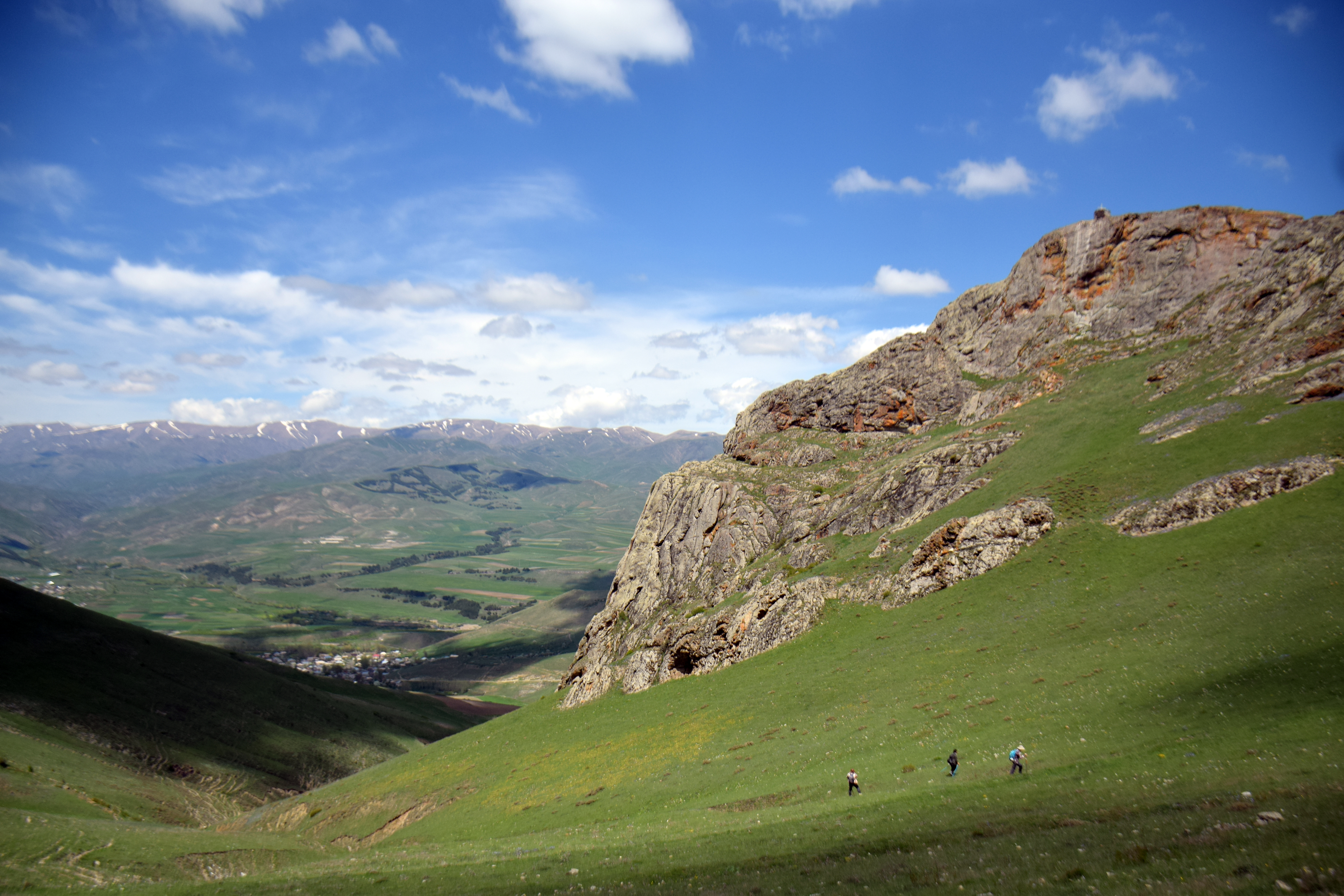

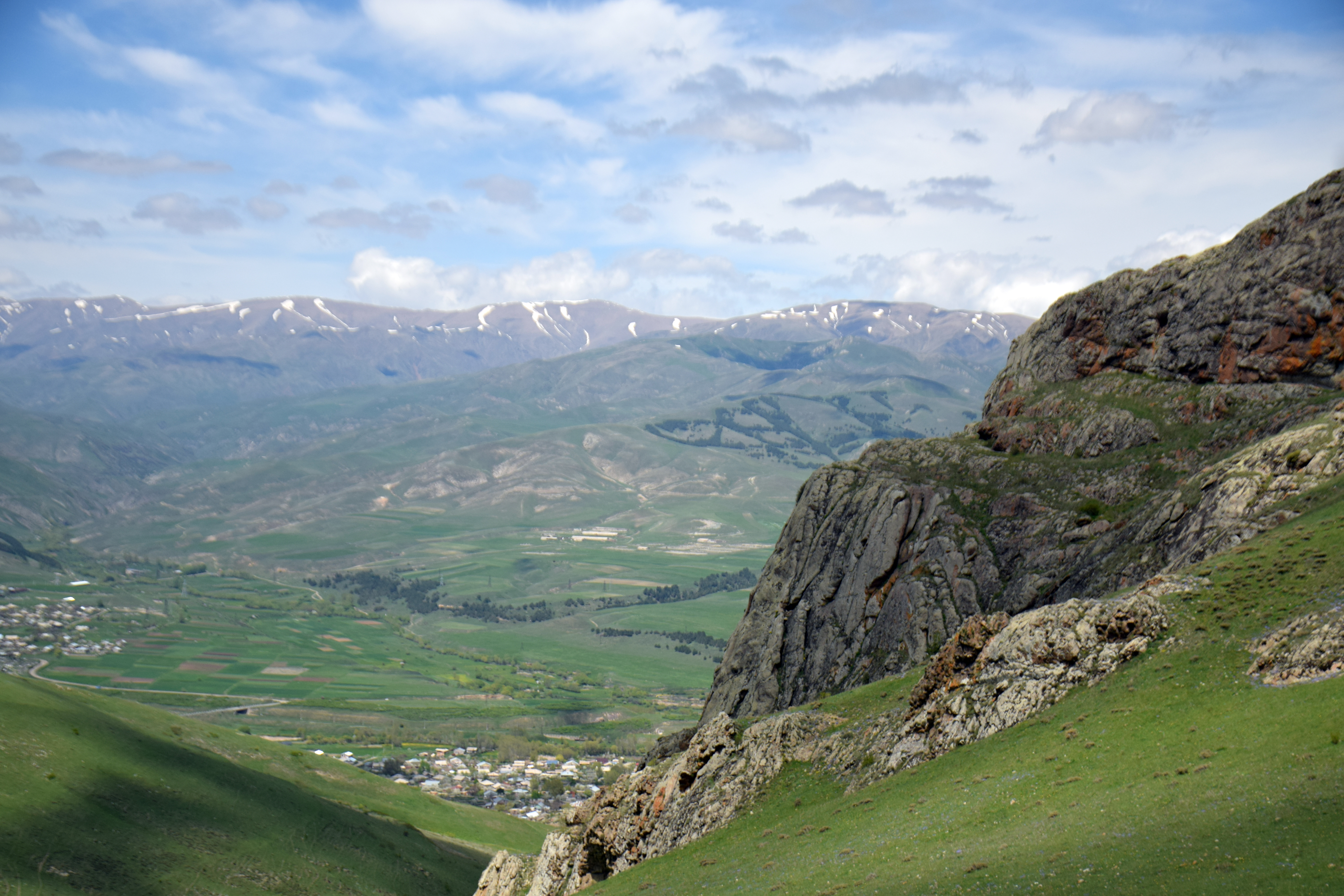

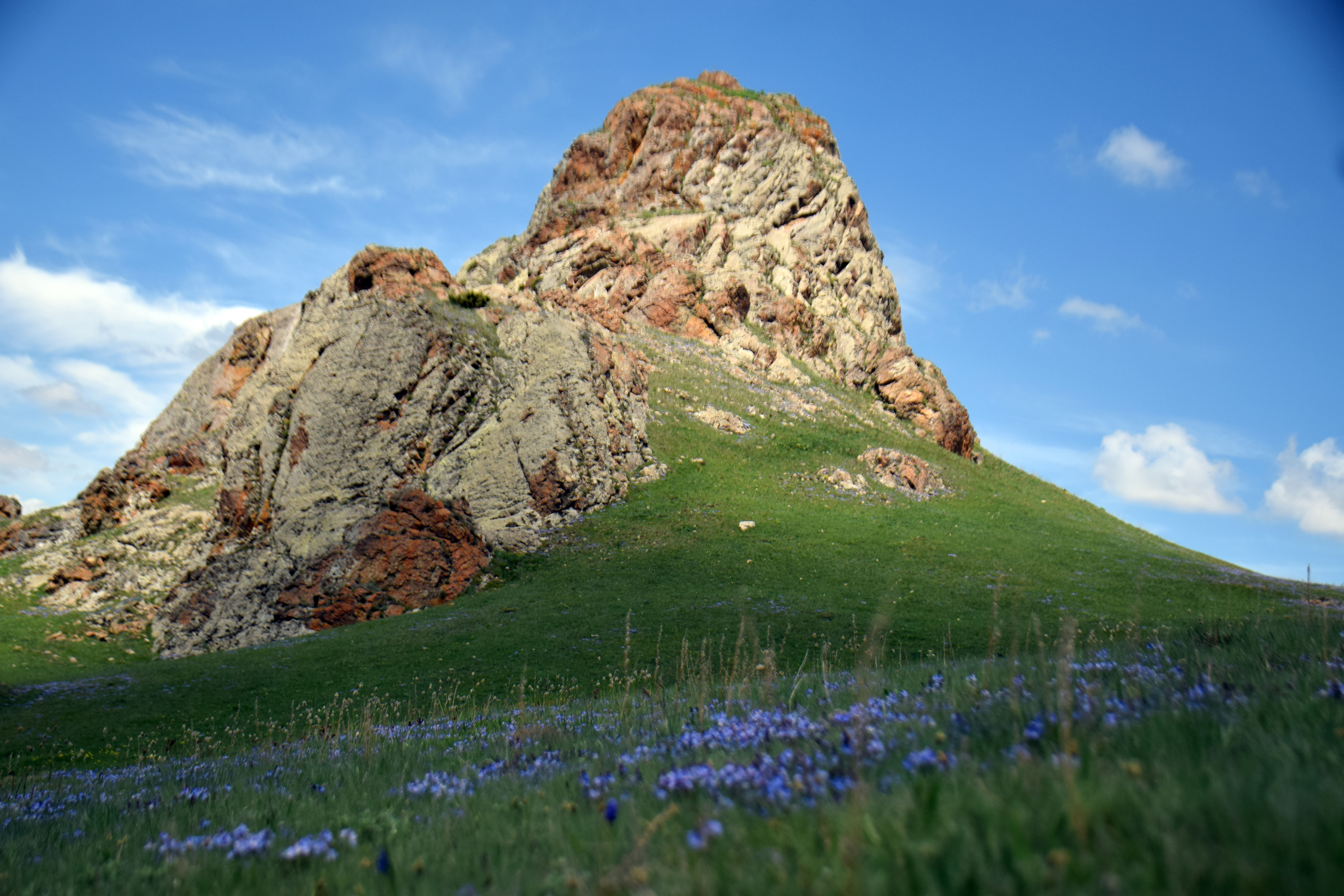
Lusnalich

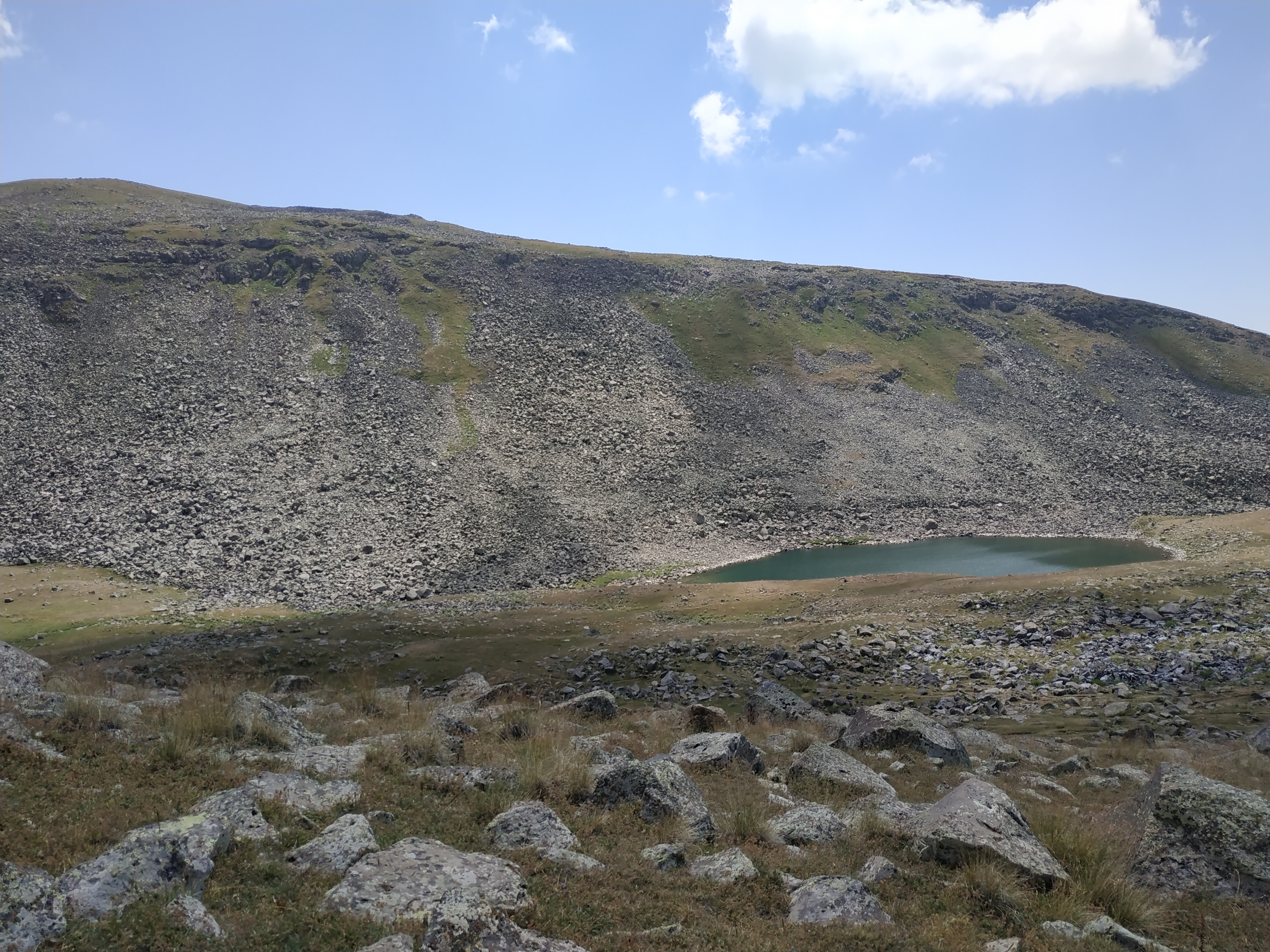

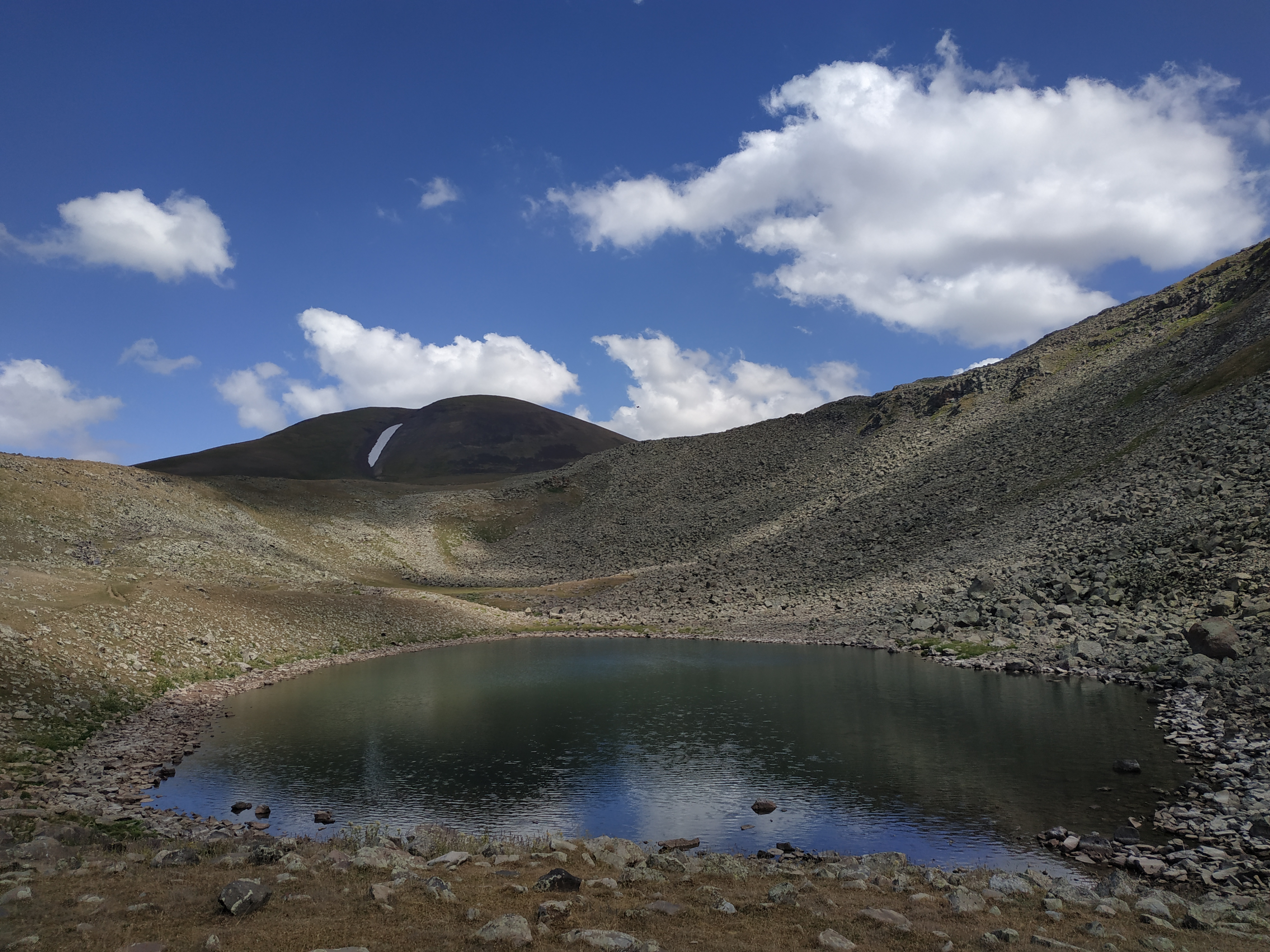

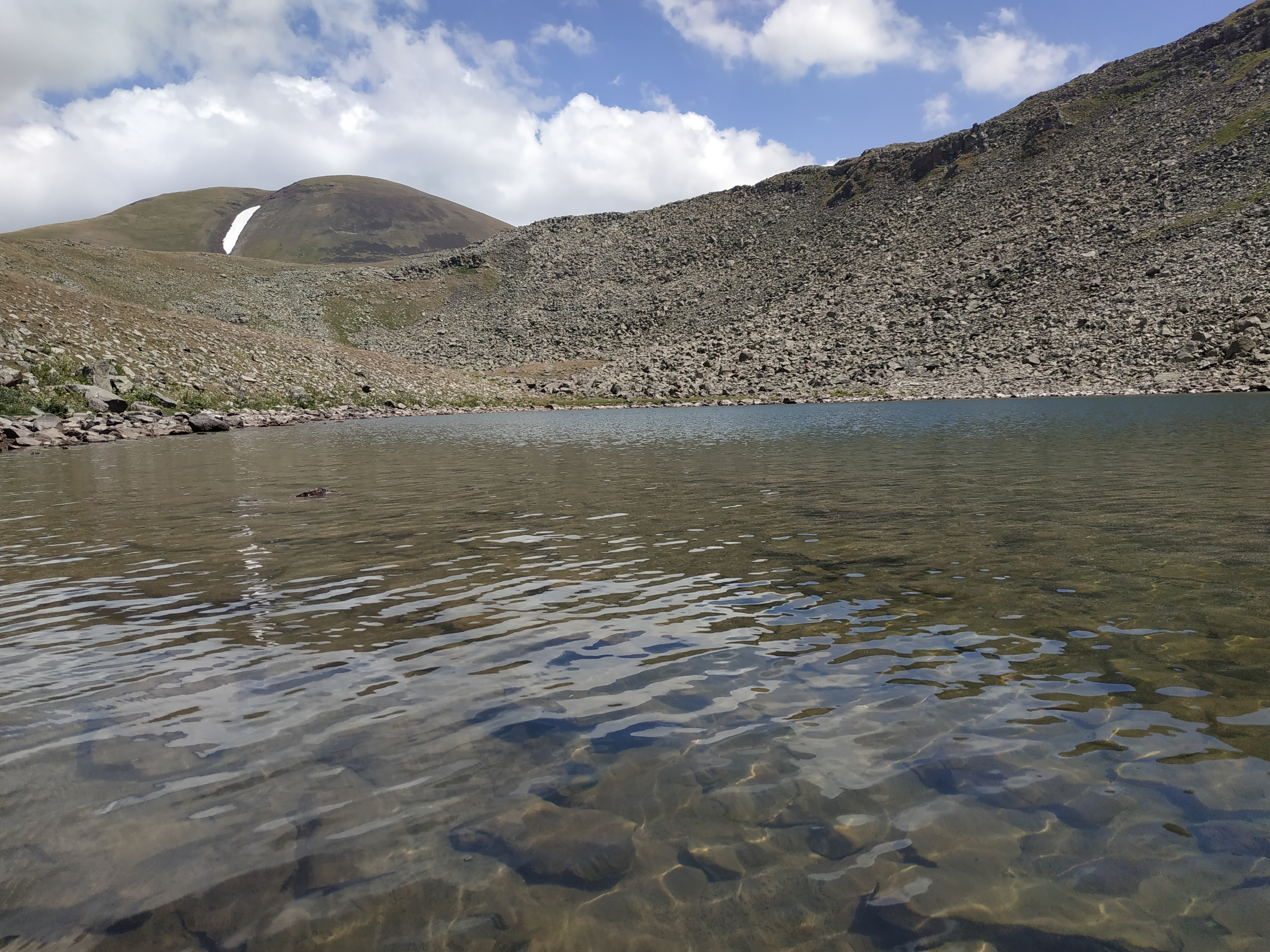
Menaksar

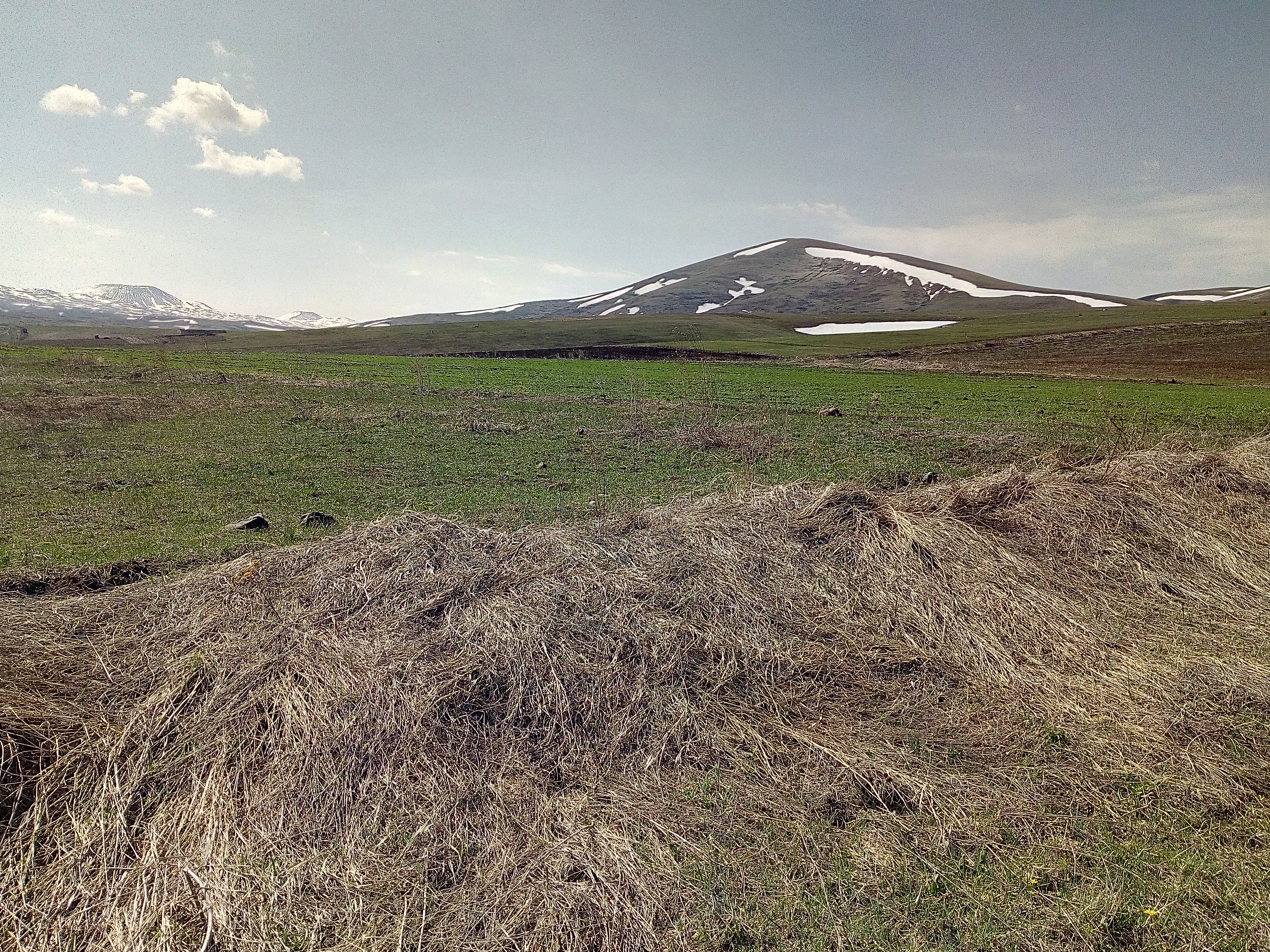

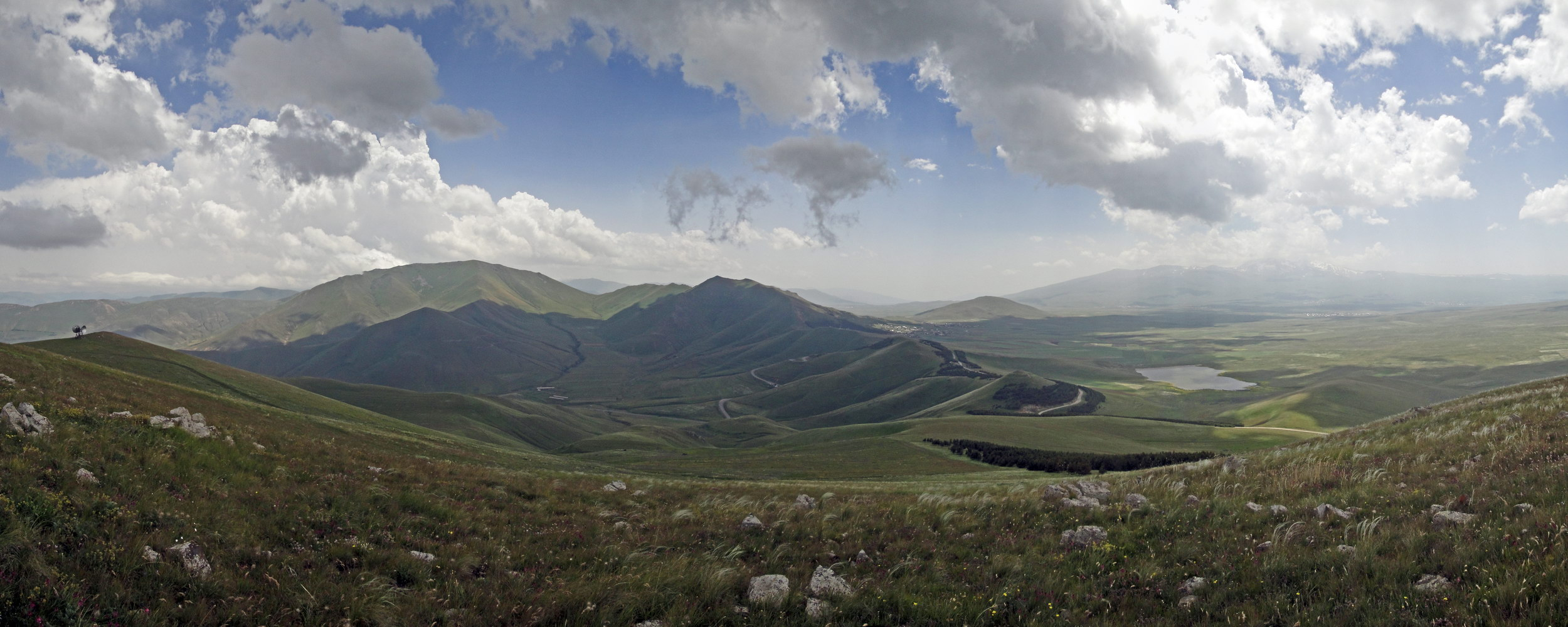
Sevkatar

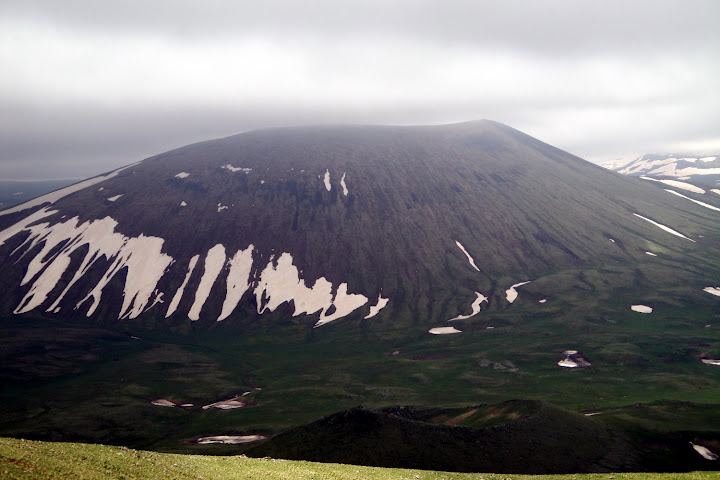

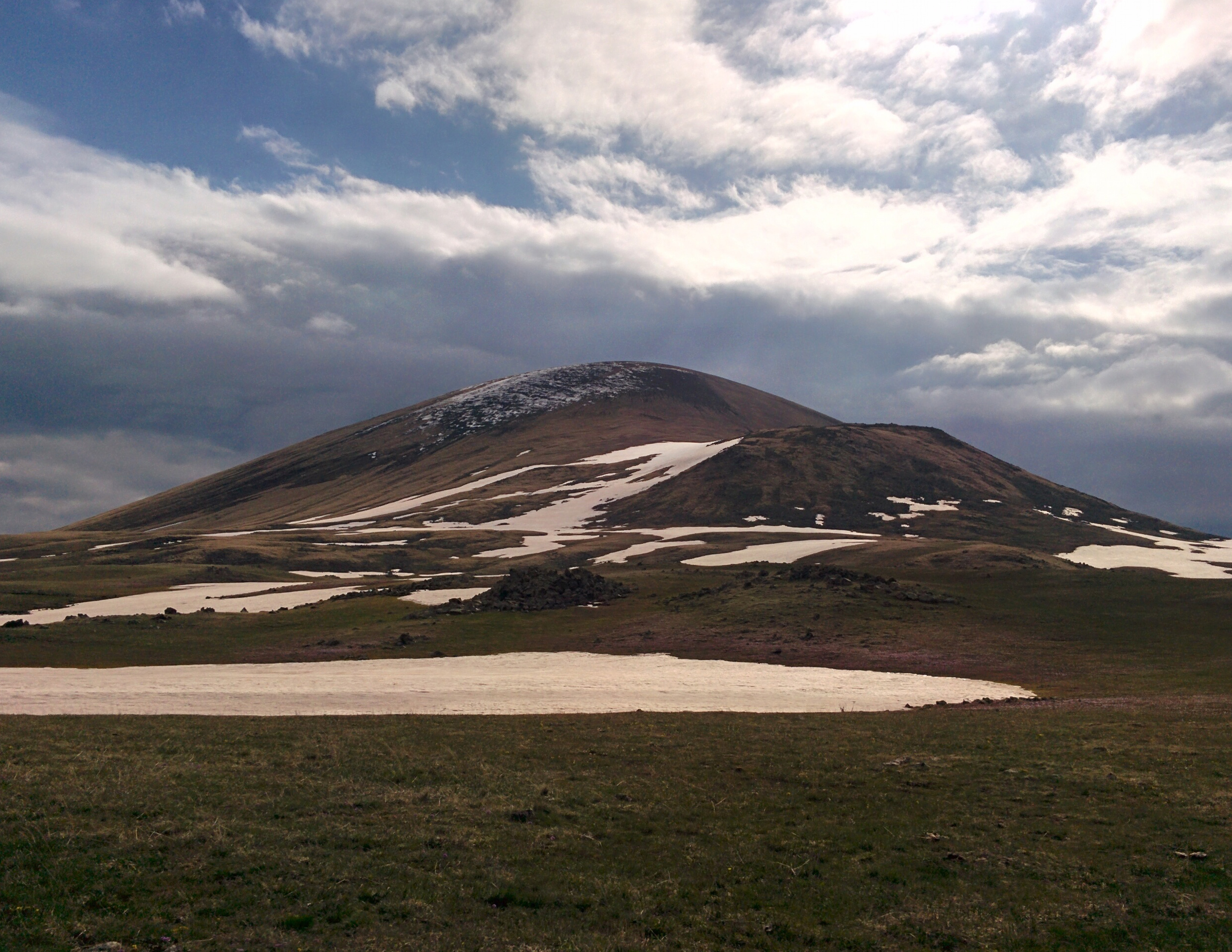
Spitakasar

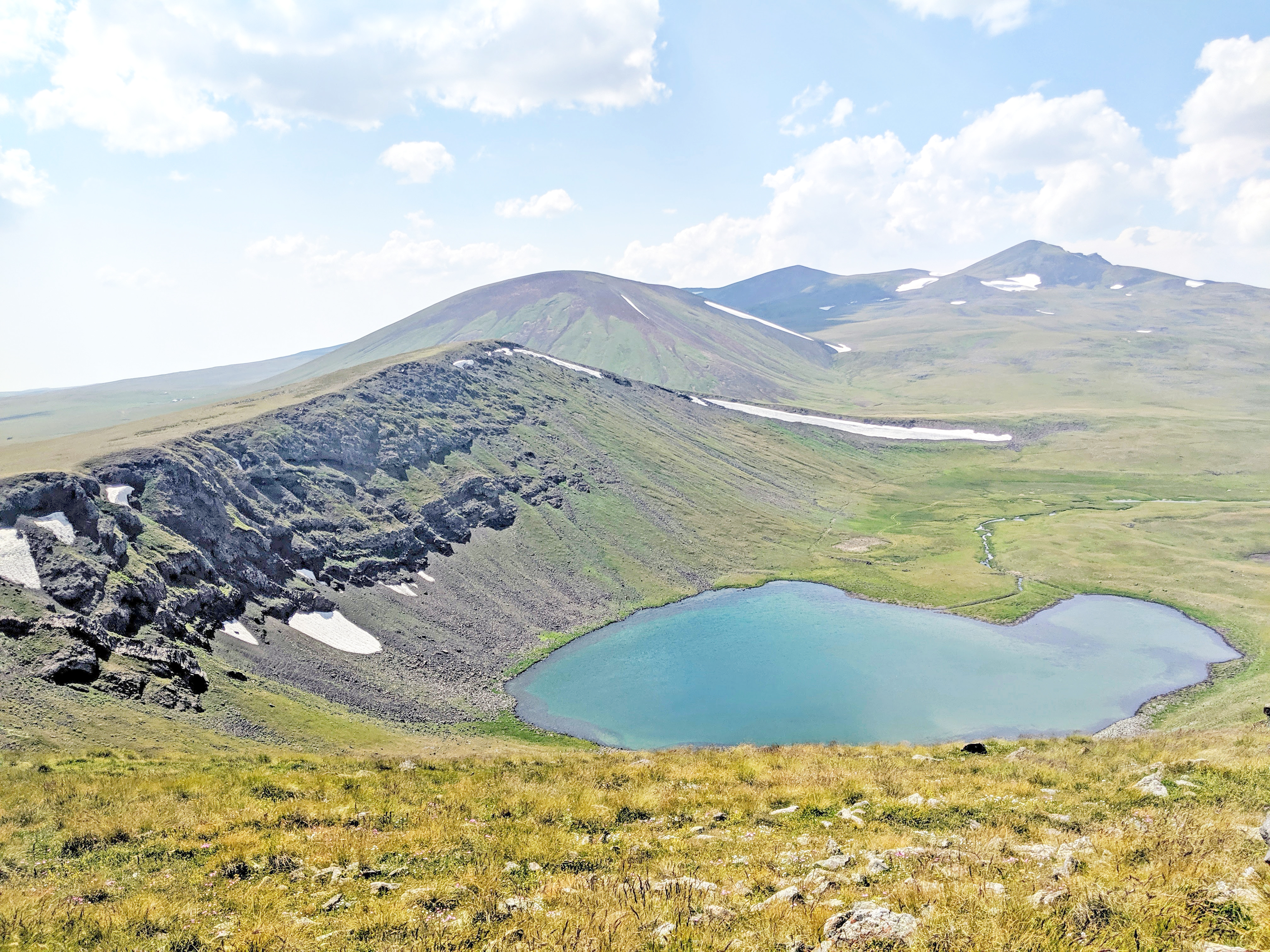

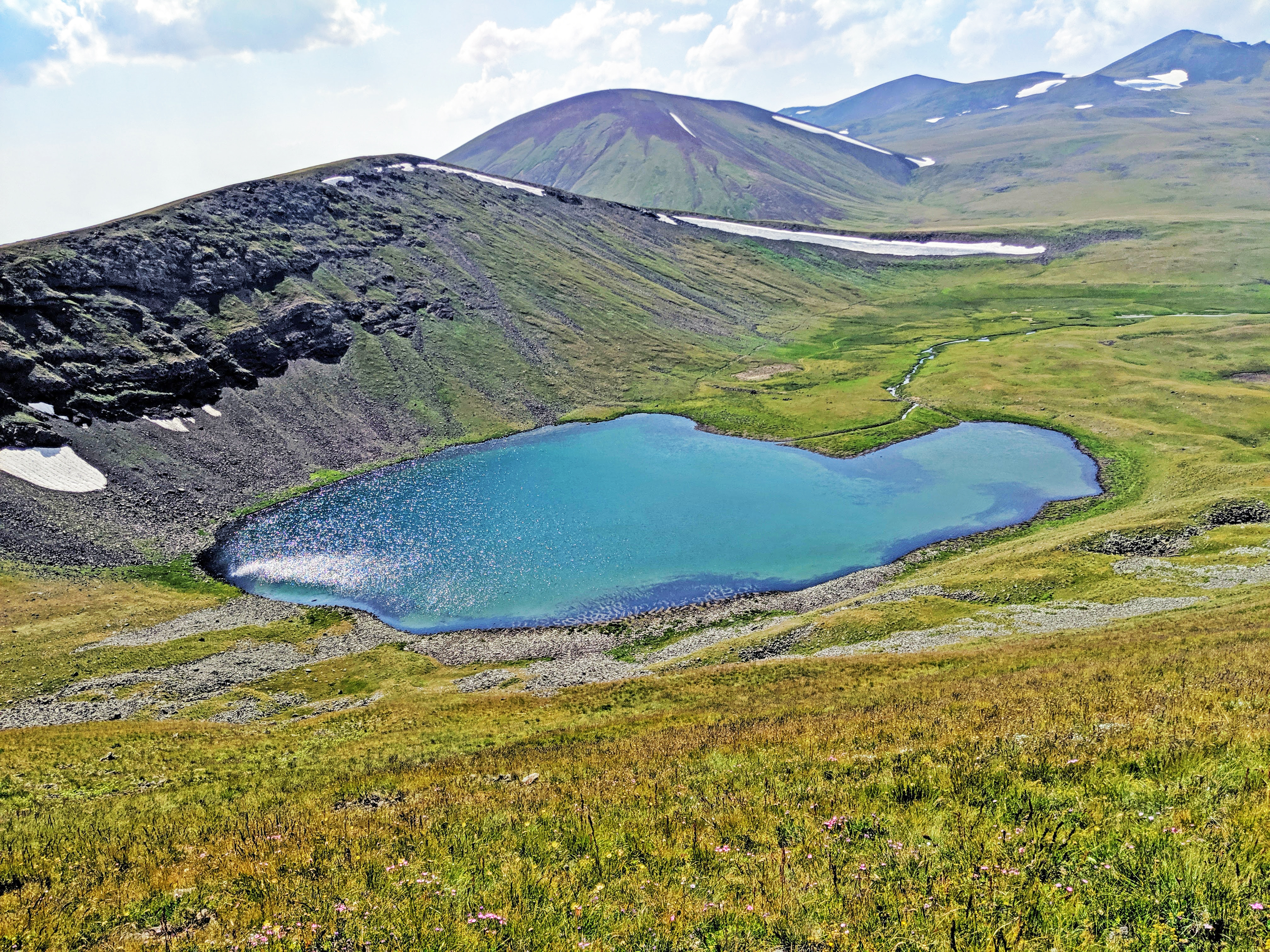

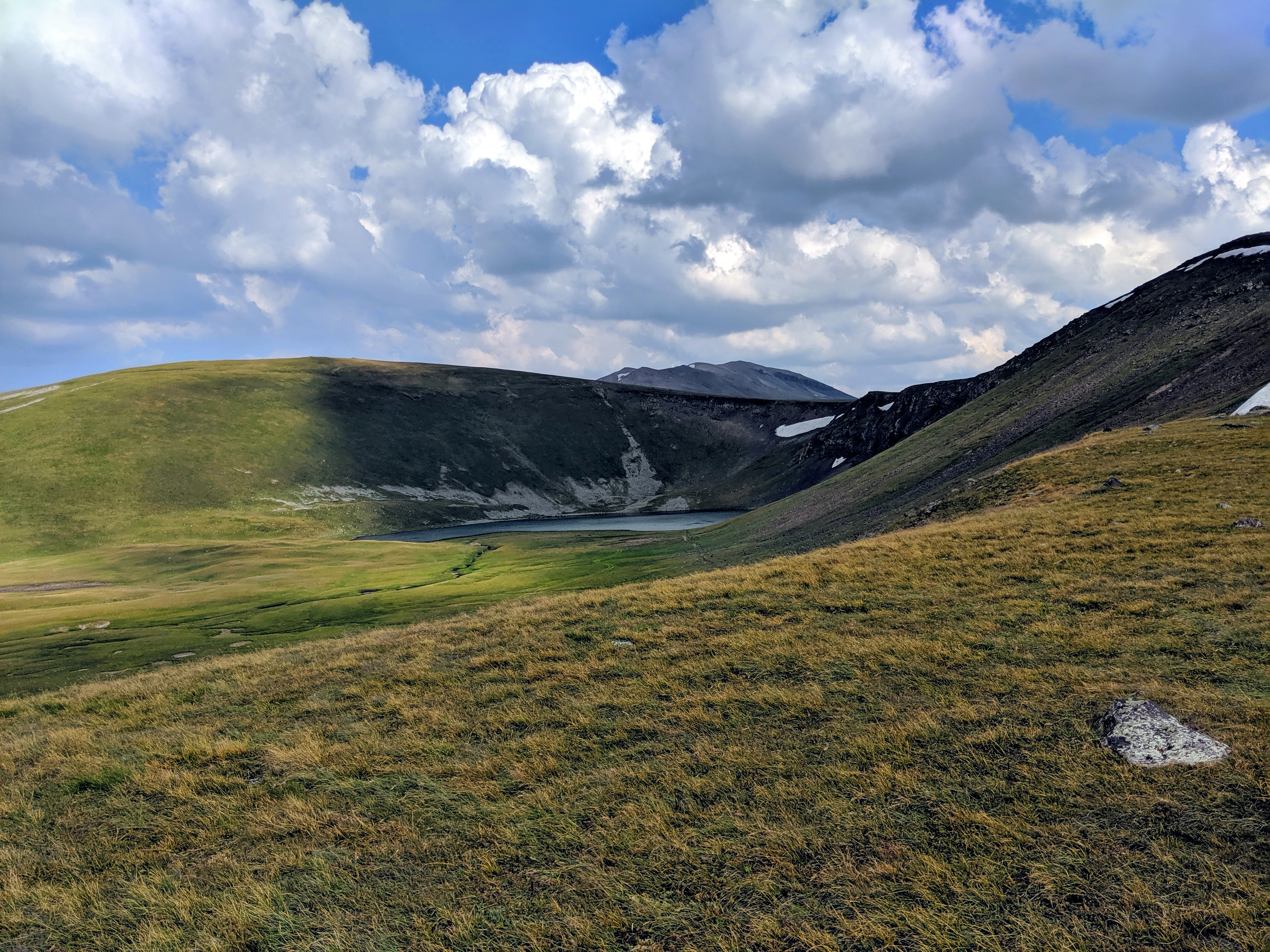

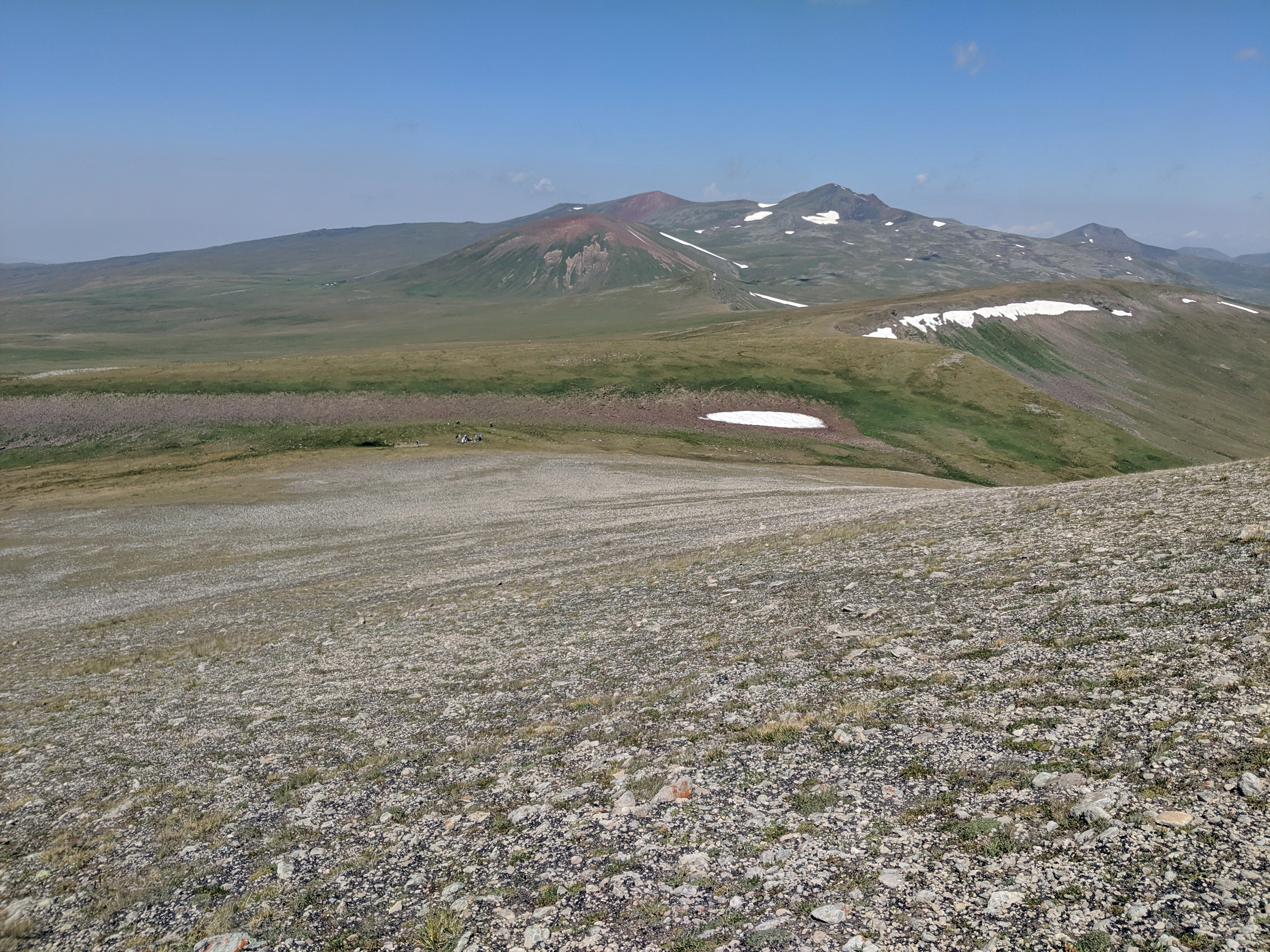

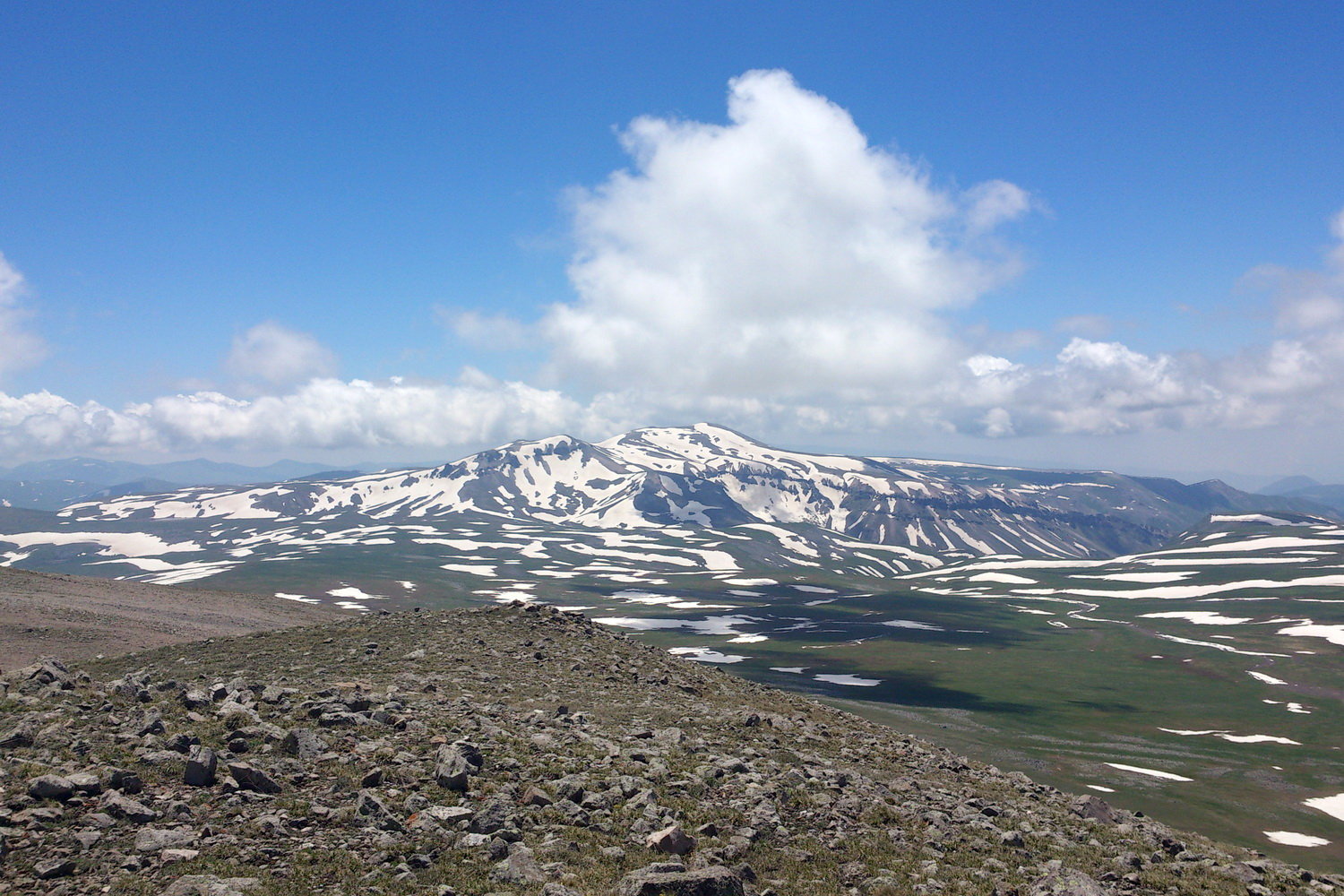

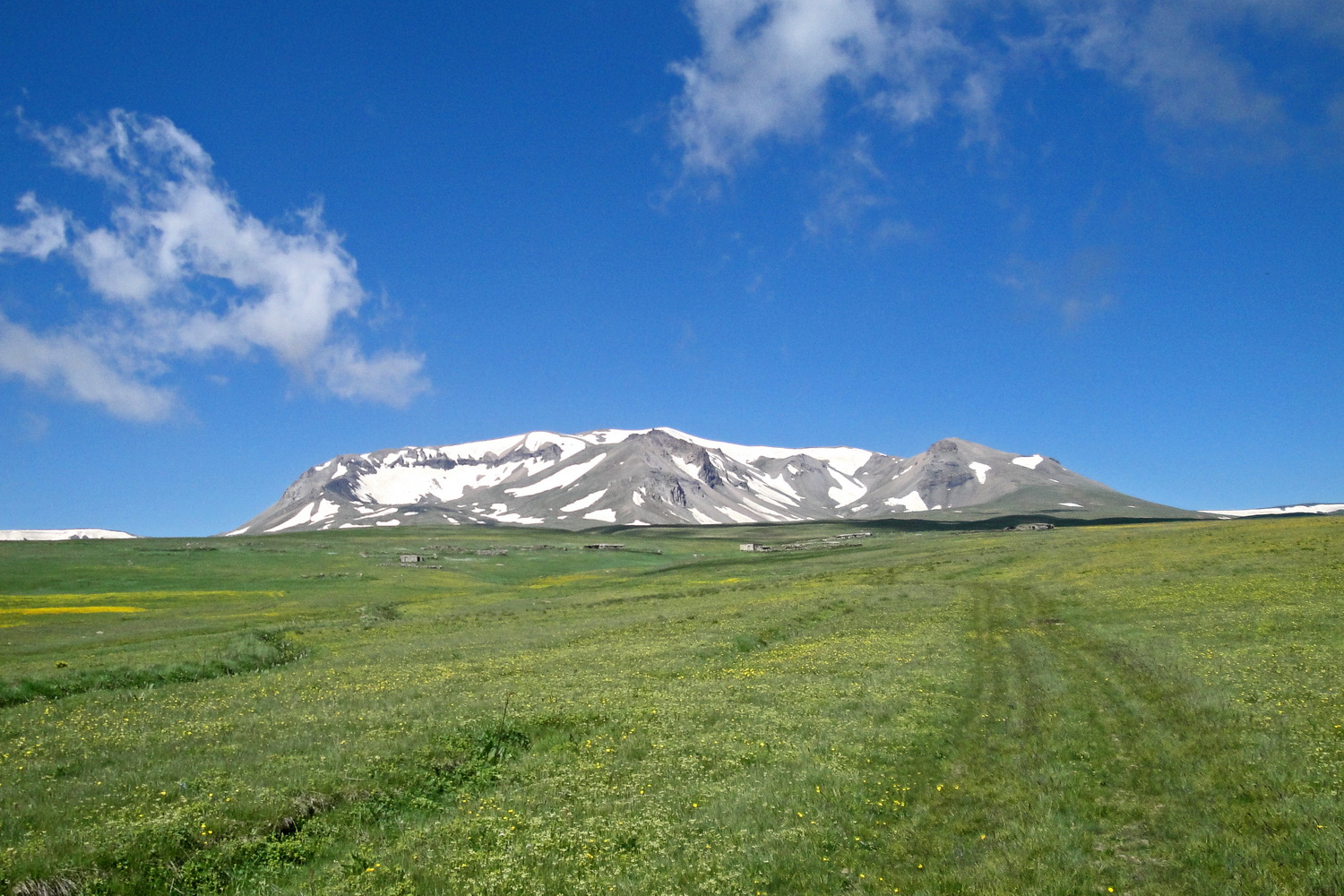

== Sources ==
- "Ghegam Ridge". Global Volcanism Program. Smithsonian Institution.
