= Ara Sargsyan and Hakob Kojoyan Museum =

- Արա Սարգսյանի և Հակոբ Կոջոյանի տուն-թանգարան
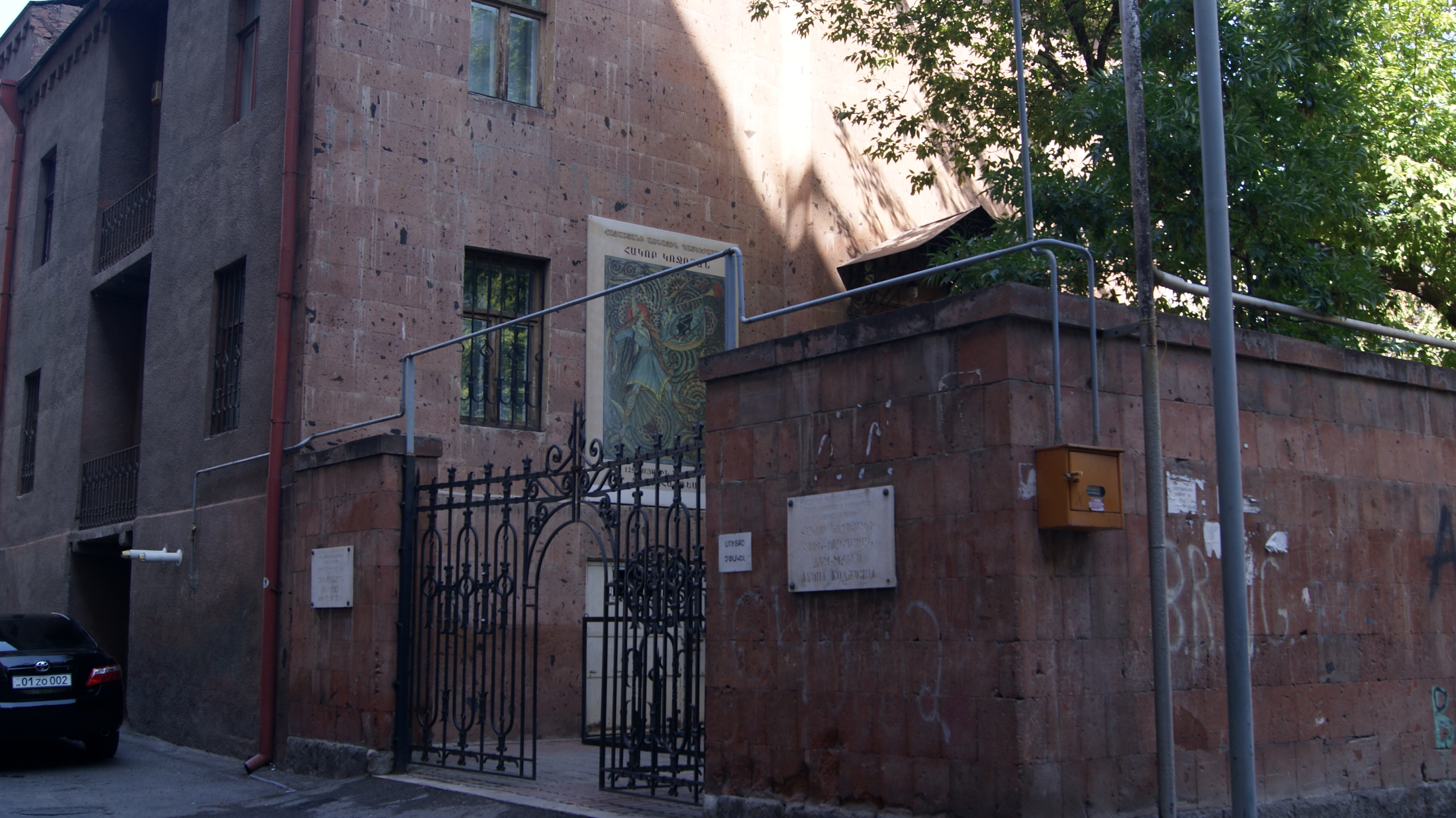
- Established: 1973
- Location: 30 Pushkin street, Yerevan, Armenia
- Coordinates: 40.1860°N 44.5086°E
- Type: biographical museum, art museum

Ara Sargsyan and Hakob Kojoyan Museum (Armenian: Արա Սարգսյանի և Հակոբ Կոջոյանի տուն-թանգարան) house museum of Ara Sargsian and Hakob Kojoyan where they lived since 1934 until the foundation of the museum.

The museum building is a cultural heritage monument in Armenia.

== History ==
Ara Sargsyan and Hakob Kojoyan Museum was founded in Yerevan in 1973 according to the Decree of the Council of Ministers of the USSR of 25 May 1970 and is a branch of the National Gallery of Armenia.

Since 1934 Ara Sargsian and Hakob Kojoyan had been living and working here until the creation of the museum.

A two-story museum is located in the center of Yerevan, where two great Armenian masters of fine arts, sculptor Ara Sargsian (1902–1969) and painter Hakob Kojoyan (1883–1959) lived and created for decades. In 1973 by the request of the descendants the house was granted to the state, and the museum was established as a branch National Gallery of Armenia.

== Collections ==
The house-museum collection is composed of both the museum's belongings and the works of artists' families.

The works by Ara Sargsian are from the sculptor's family collections, photos of the works at student times, and gifted materials, as well as the artist's theatrical designs and graphic works.

Hakob Kojoyan's works are displayed on the second floor of the building, as well as handicrafts and personal belongings. Some of the works presented are from the funds of the National Gallery of Armenia, the other part is a gift from the artist's heirs.

== Gallery ==
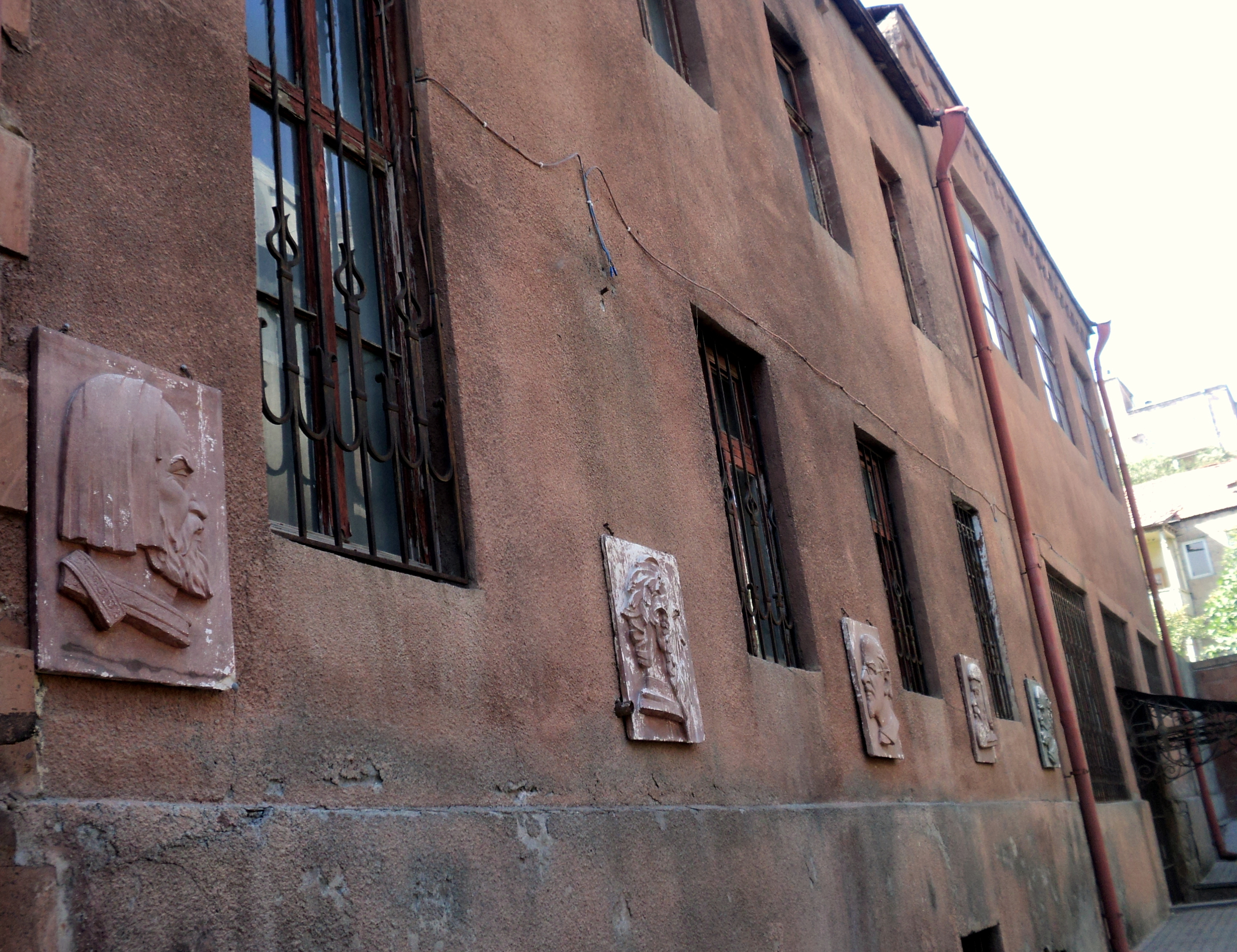
Backyard of the museum

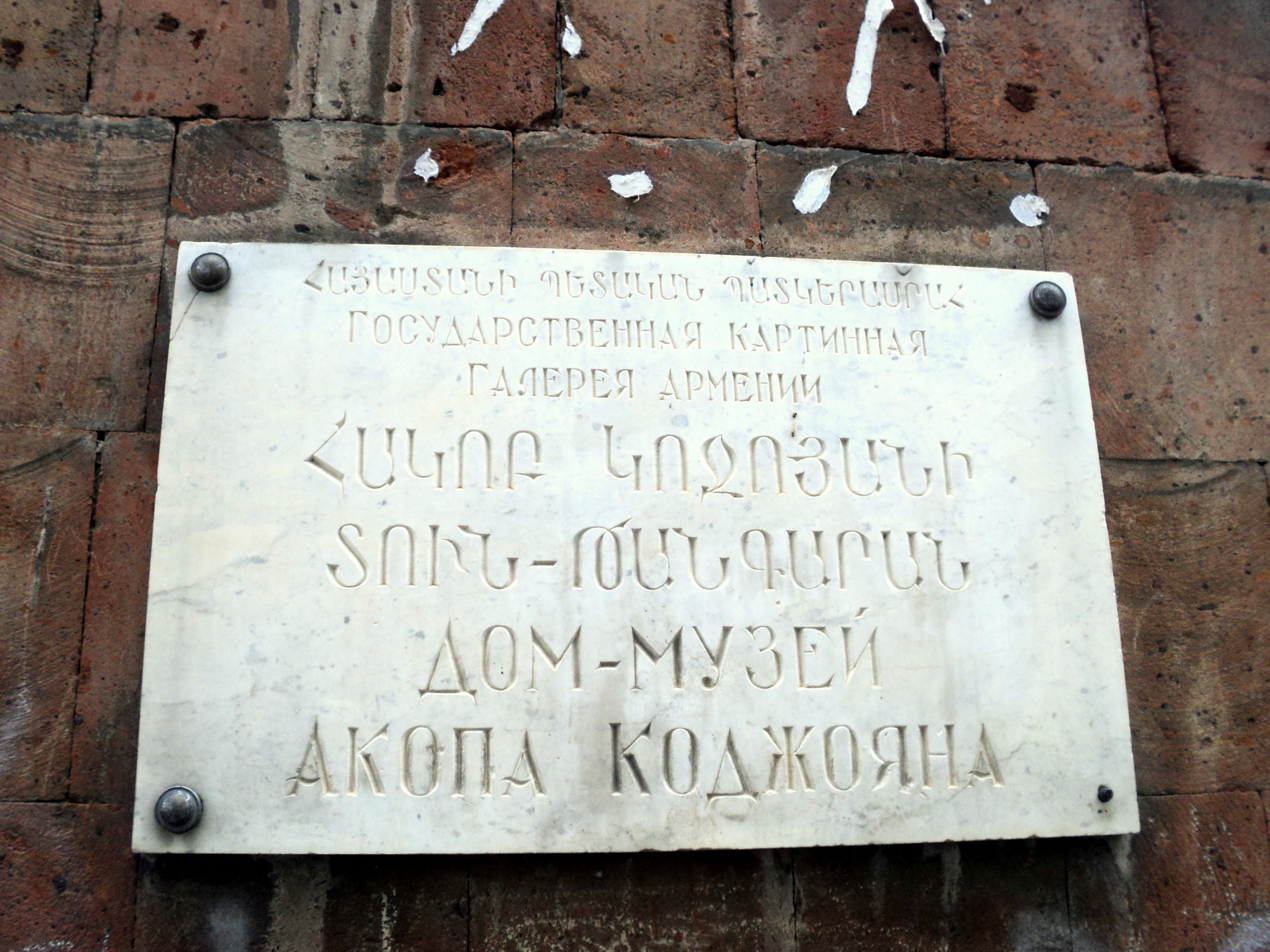
Plaque at the entrance of the museum

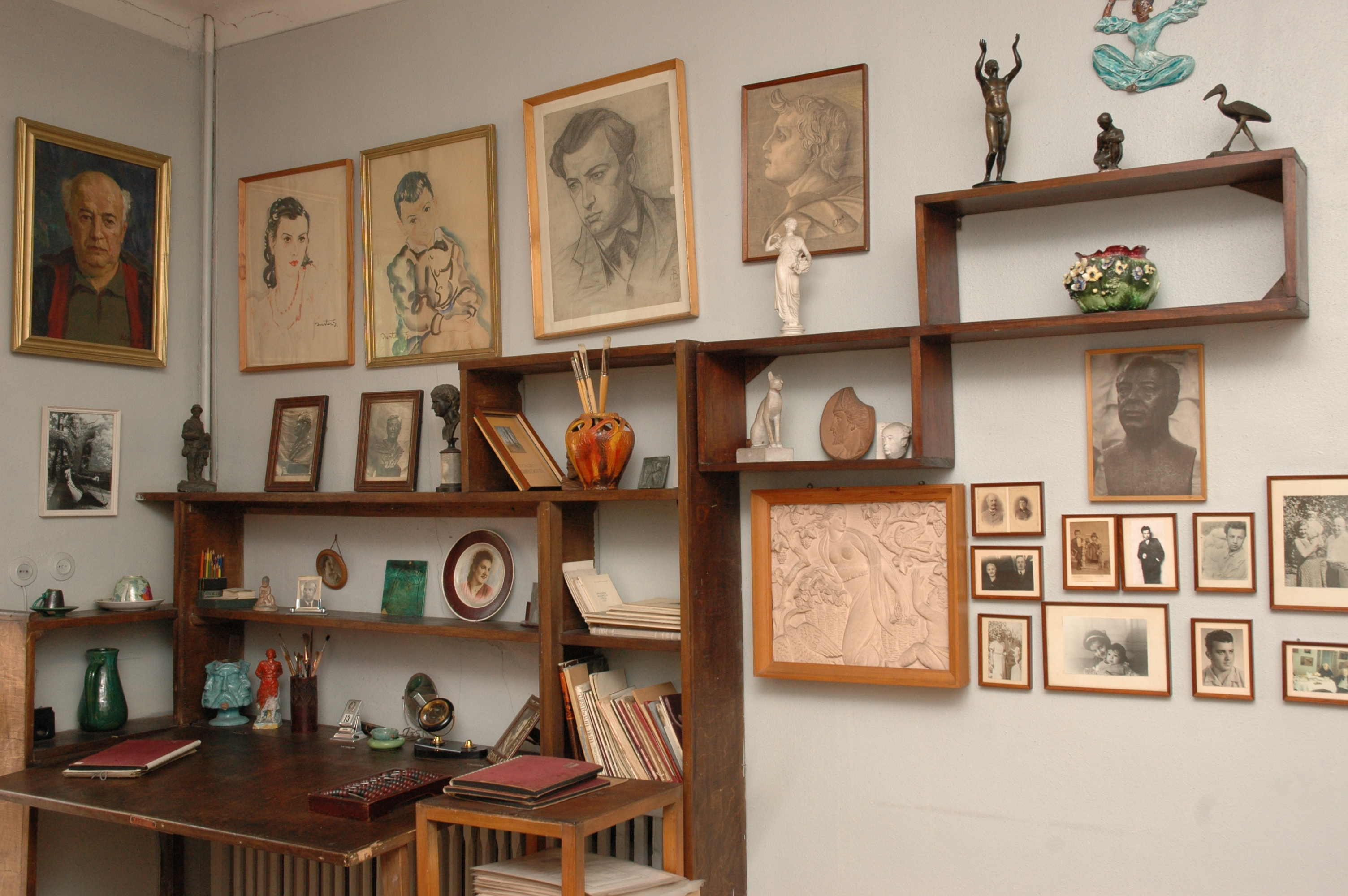
Ara Sargsyan studio

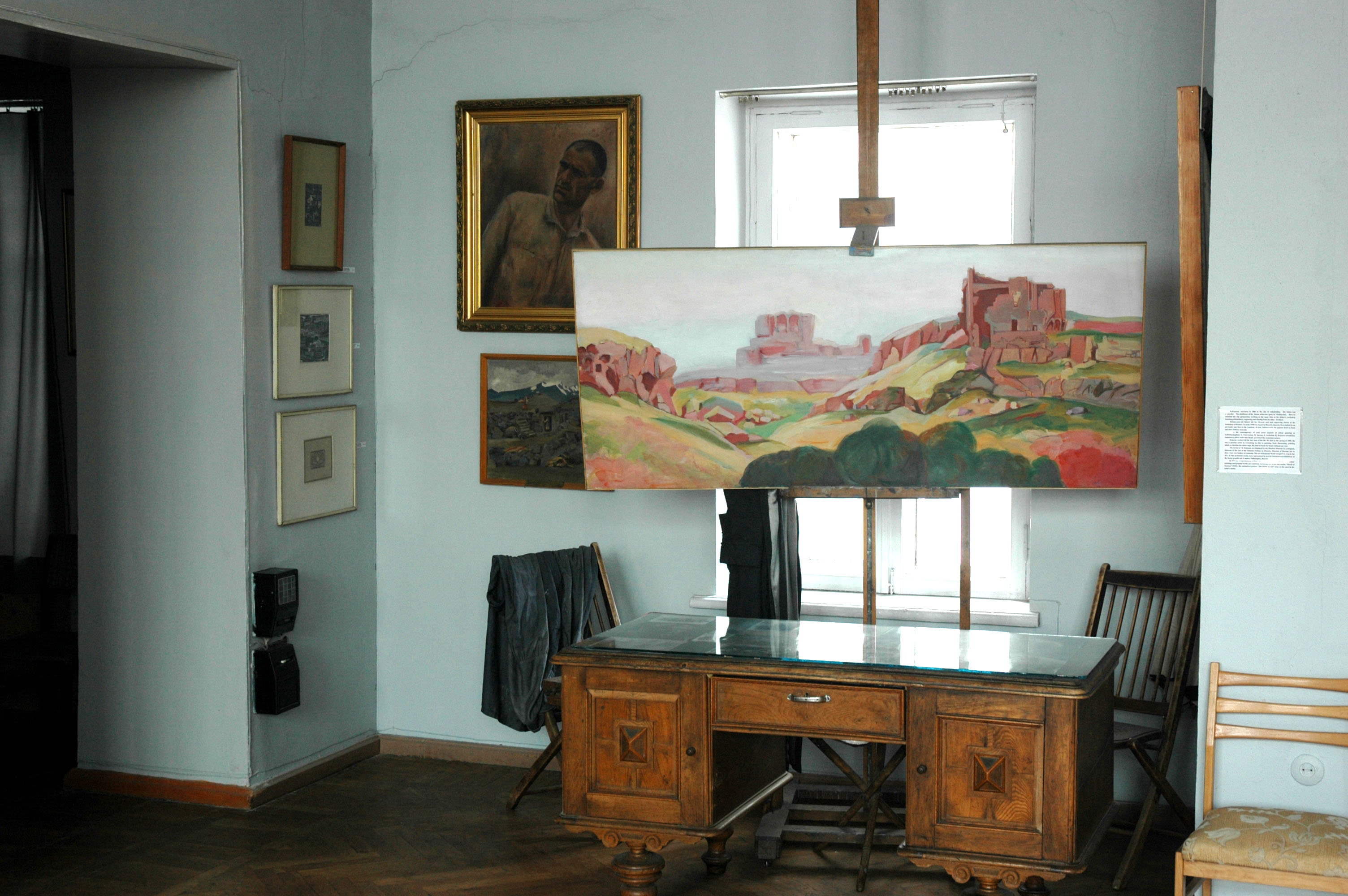
Hakob Kojoyan studio

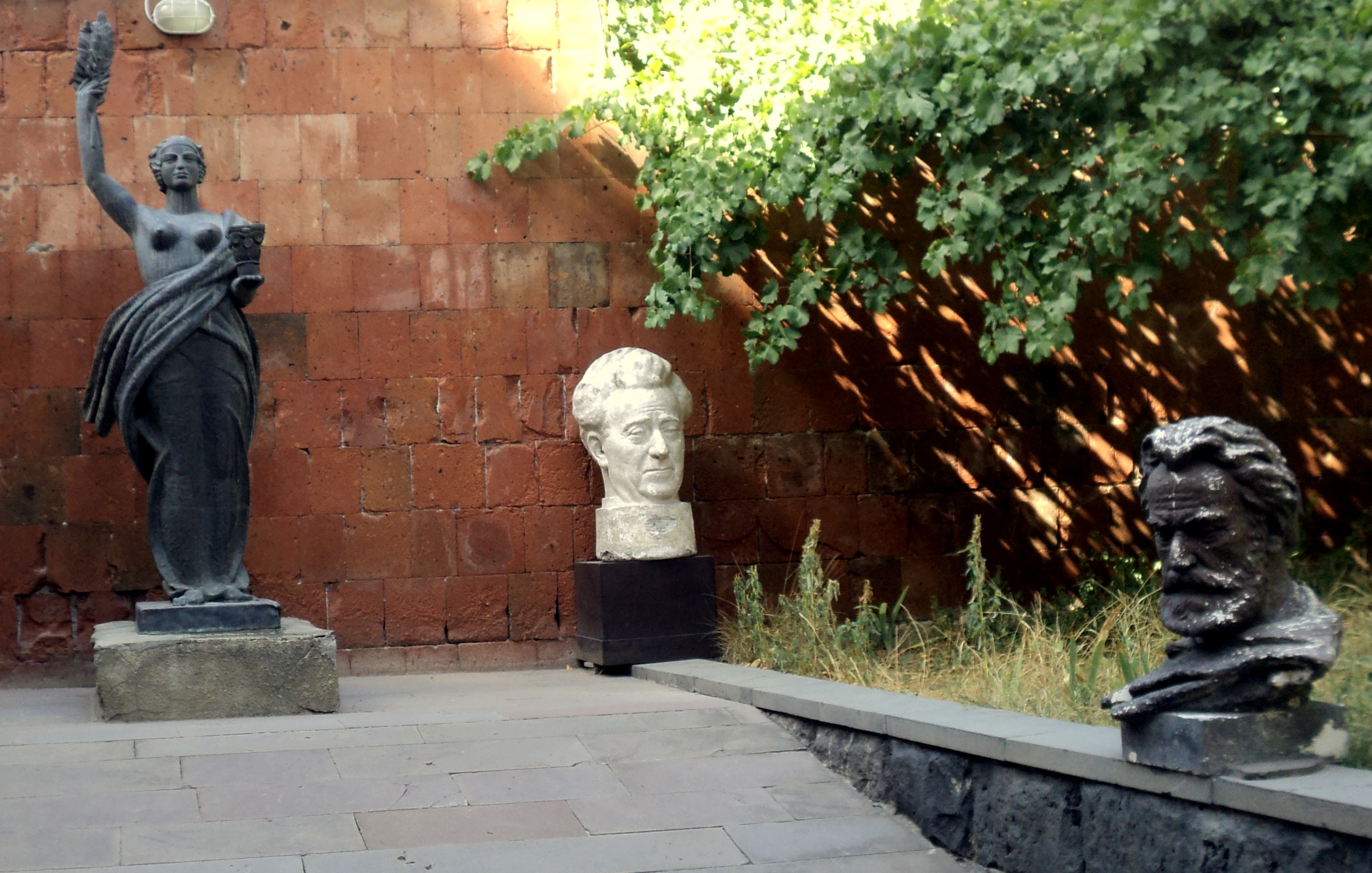
Artworks in the museum garden

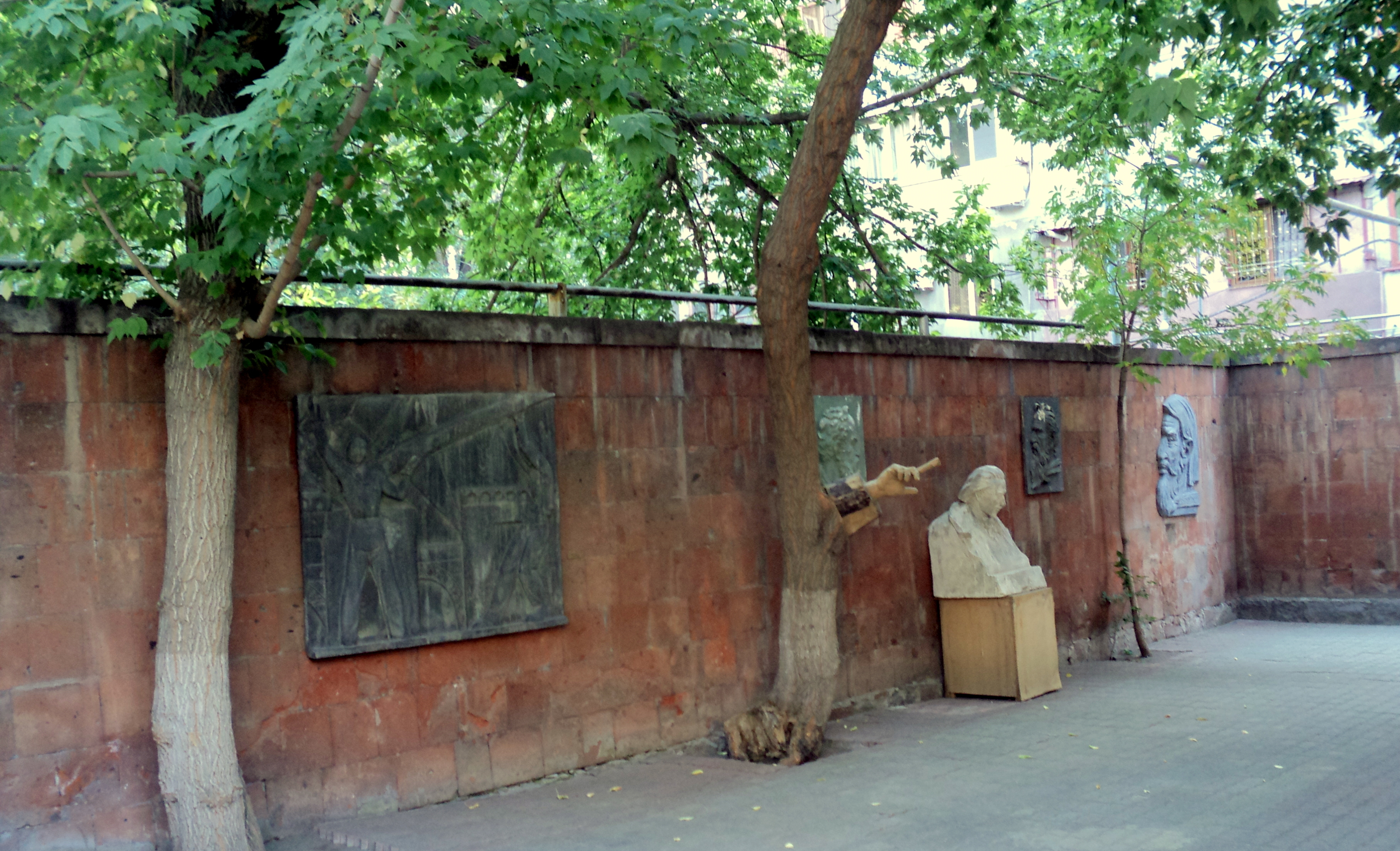
Artworks in the museum garden

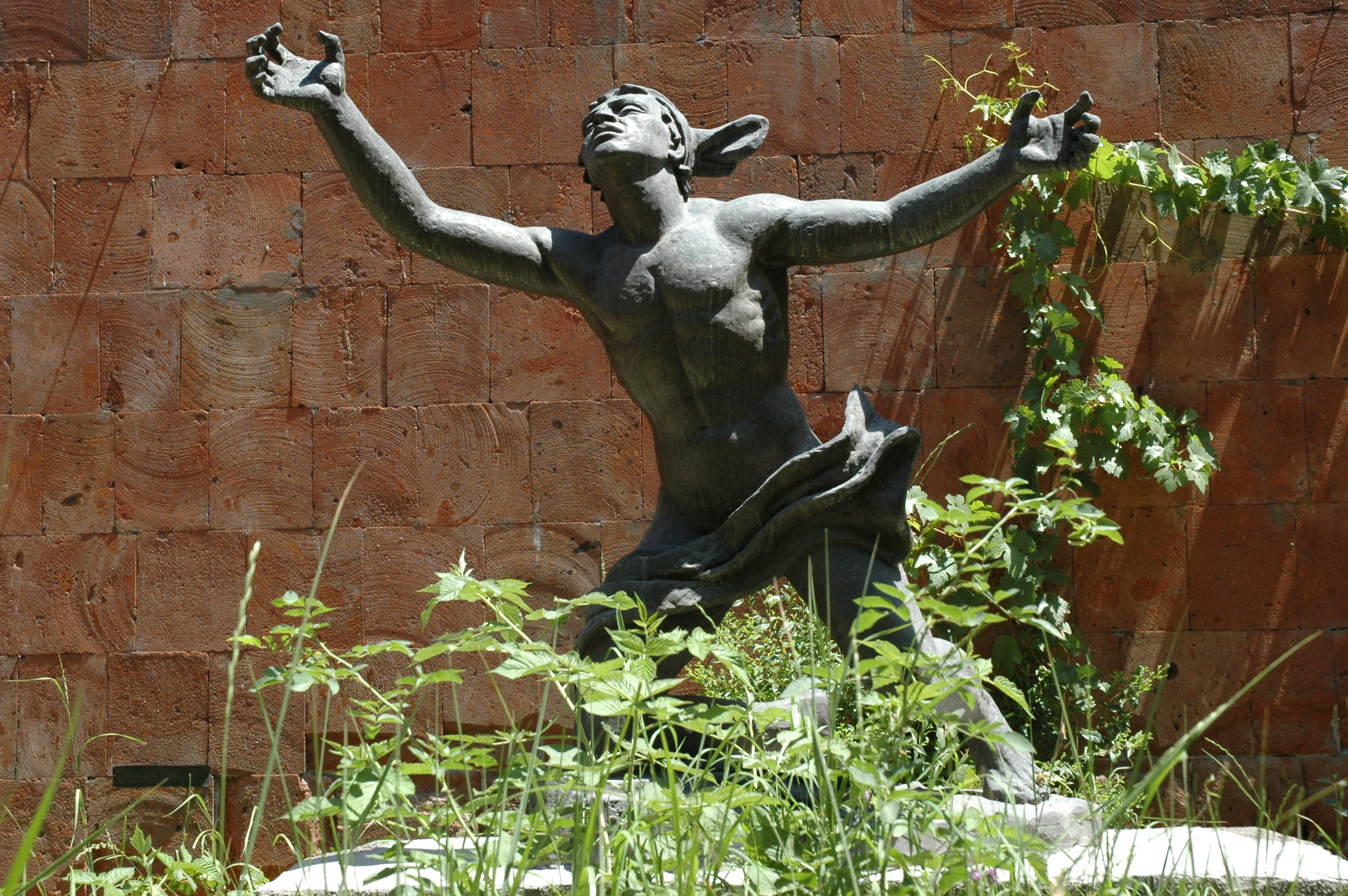
Hiroshima

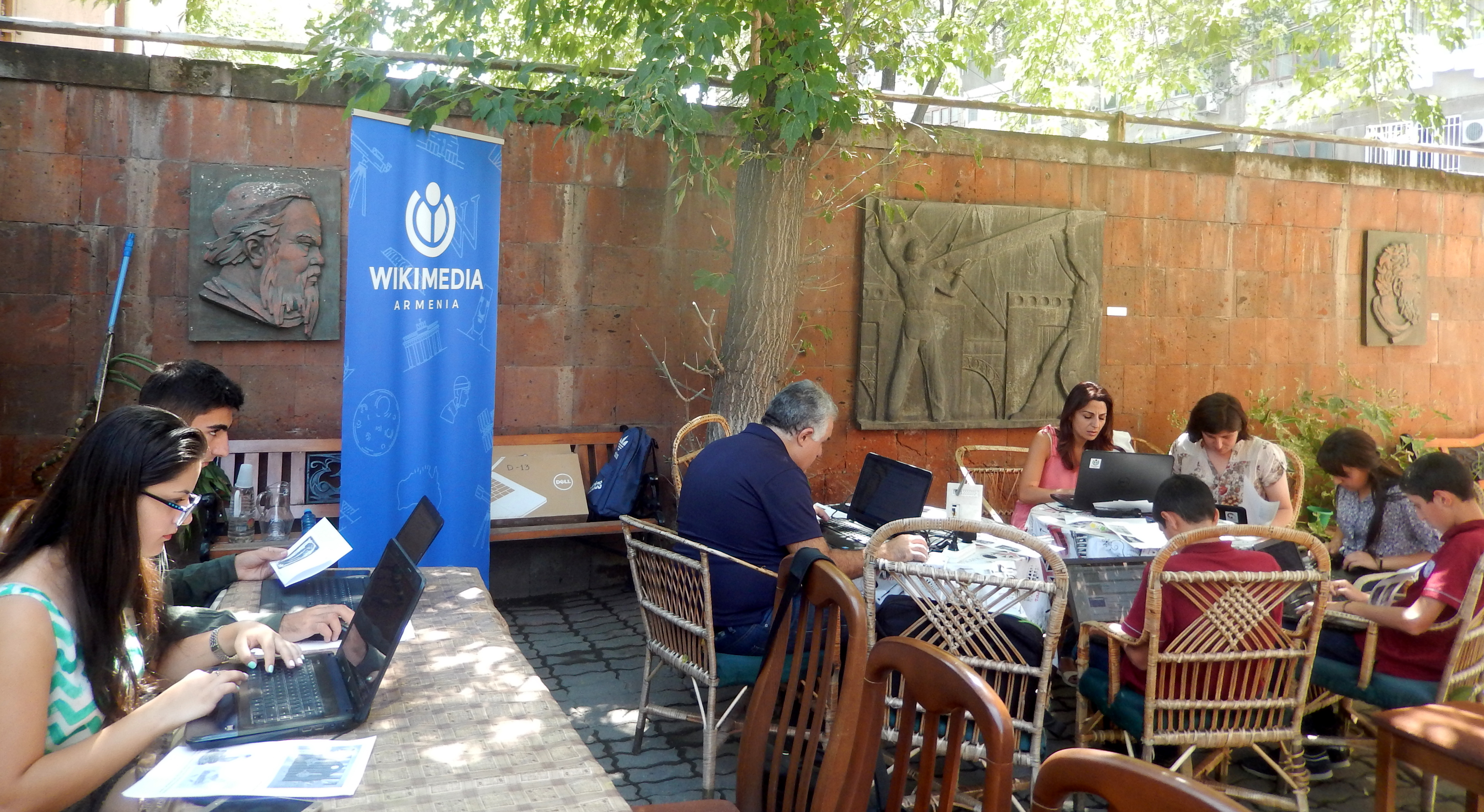
Wikidata edit-a-thon at Ara Sargsyan & Hakob Kojoyan Museum

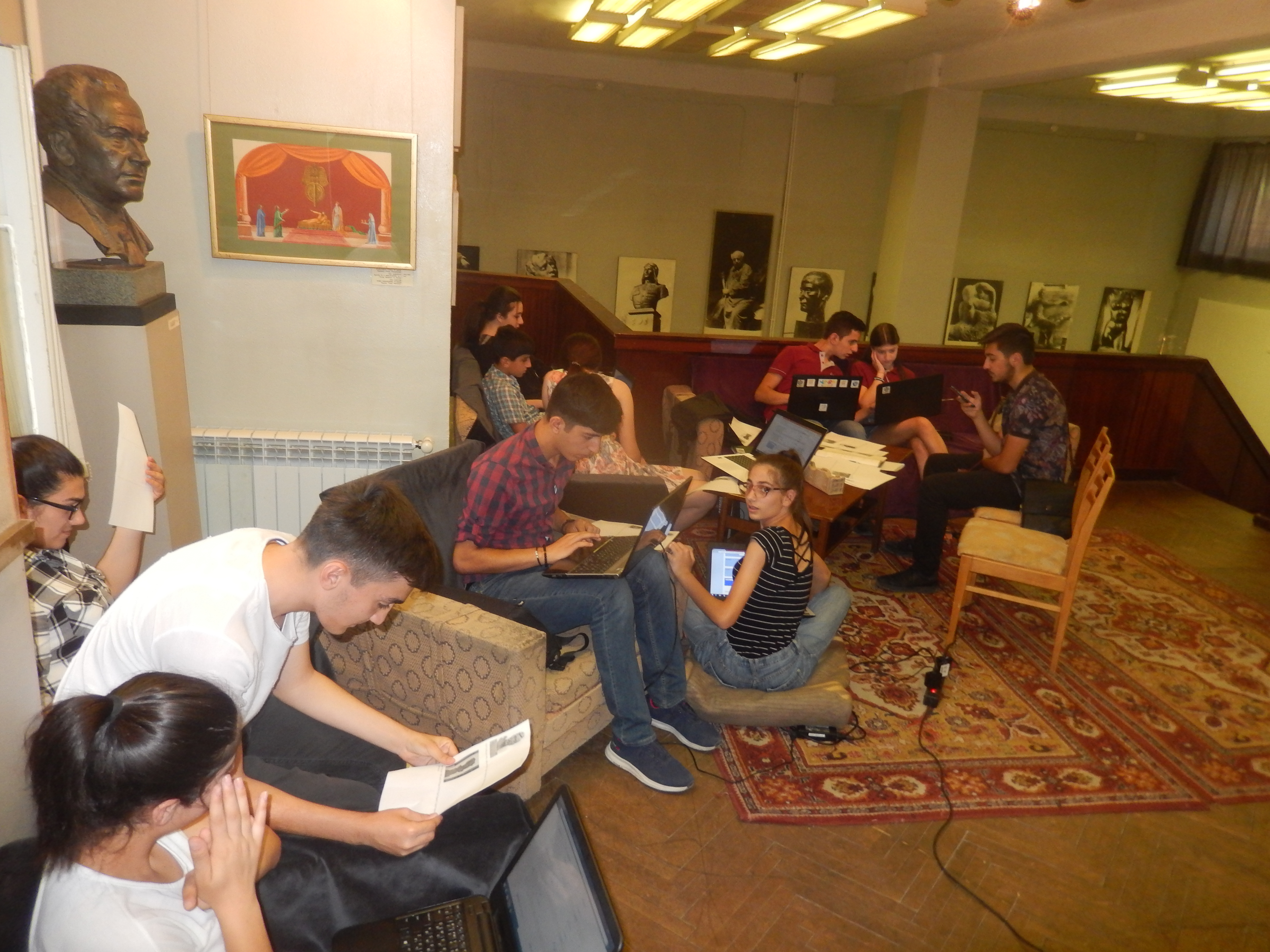
Wikidata edit-a-thon at Ara Sargsyan & Hakob Kojoyan Museum
