= Ajapnyak District =

District in Yerevan, Armenia

Coordinates: 40°11′57″N 44°28′14″E

Ajapnyak Աջափնյակ
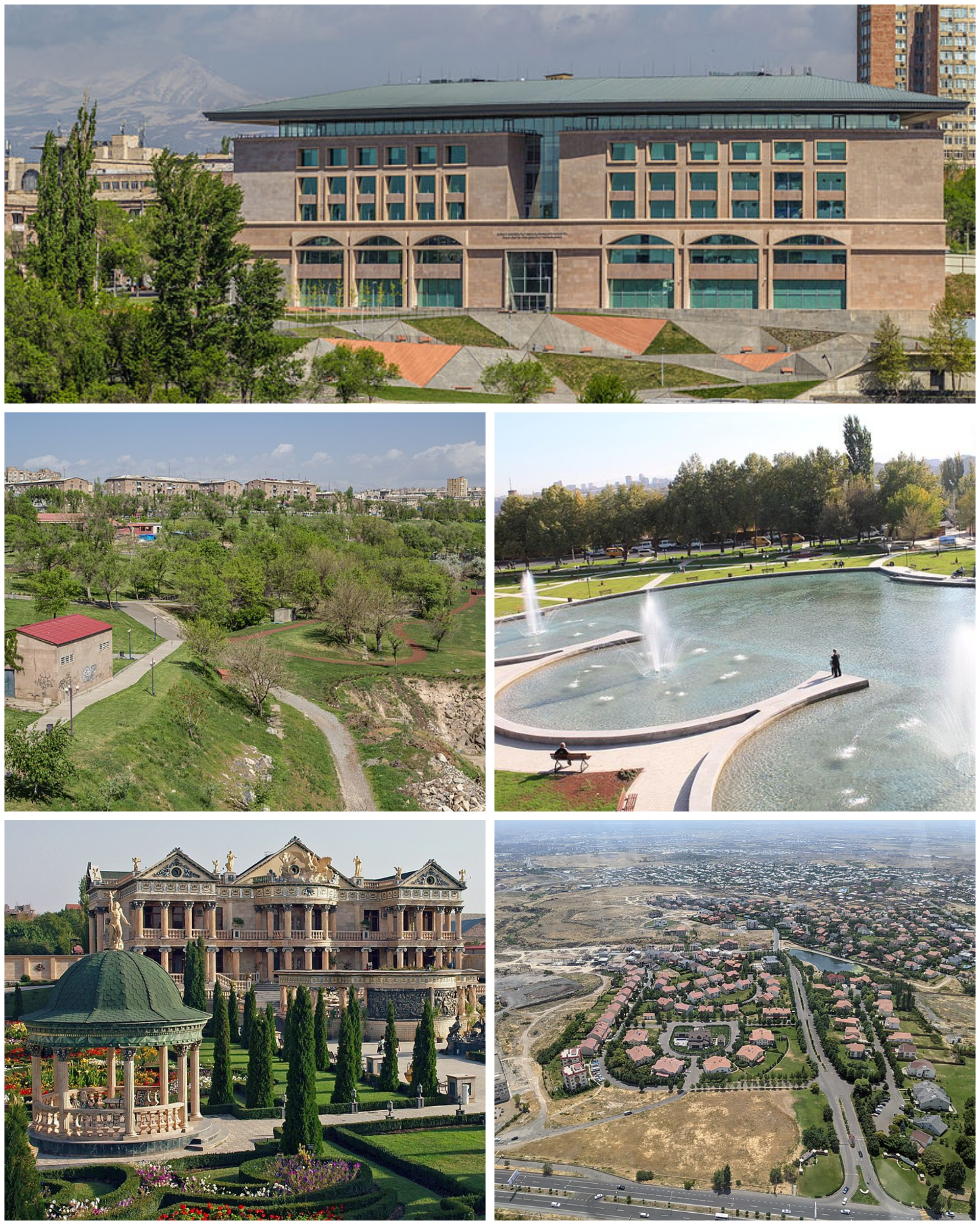

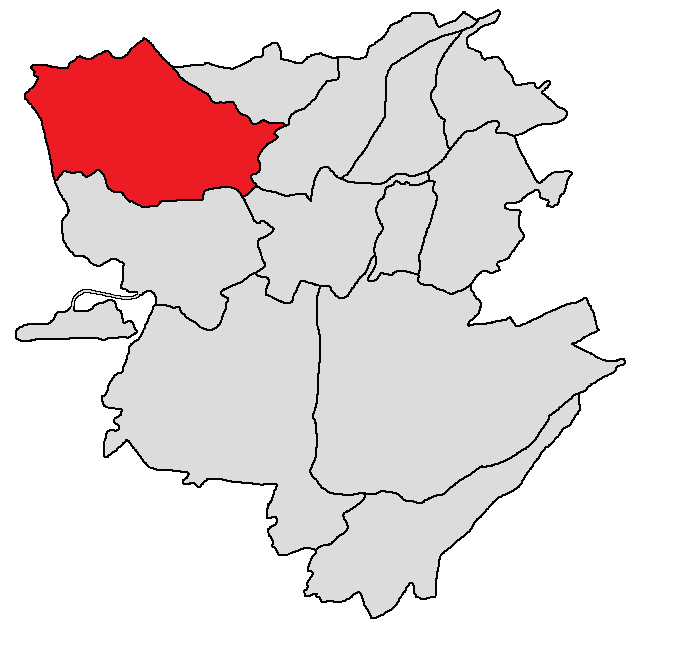
- Ajapnyak district shown in red

- Location within Armenia
- Country: Armenia
- Marz (Province): Yerevan

Government
  - Mayor of District: Gevorg Babayan

Area
  - Total: 25.82 km^{2} (9.97 sq mi)

Population (2022 census)
  - Total: 111,100
  - Density: 4,303/km^{2} (11,140/sq mi)
- Time zone: UTC+4 (AMT)

Ajapnyak (Armenian: Աջափնյակ վարչական շրջան, romanized: Ajapnyak varch’akan shrjan), is one of the 12 districts of Yerevan, the capital of Armenia. Located to the northwest of the city centre, Ajapnyak has common borders with the districts of Arabkir from the east, Davtashen from the north, Kentron from the southeast, and Malatia-Sebastia from the south. Hrazdan River forms the natural border of the district from the east. Ajapnyak has also common borders with the provinces of Armavir and Aragatsotn from the west, and Kotayk from the north.

== Overview ==
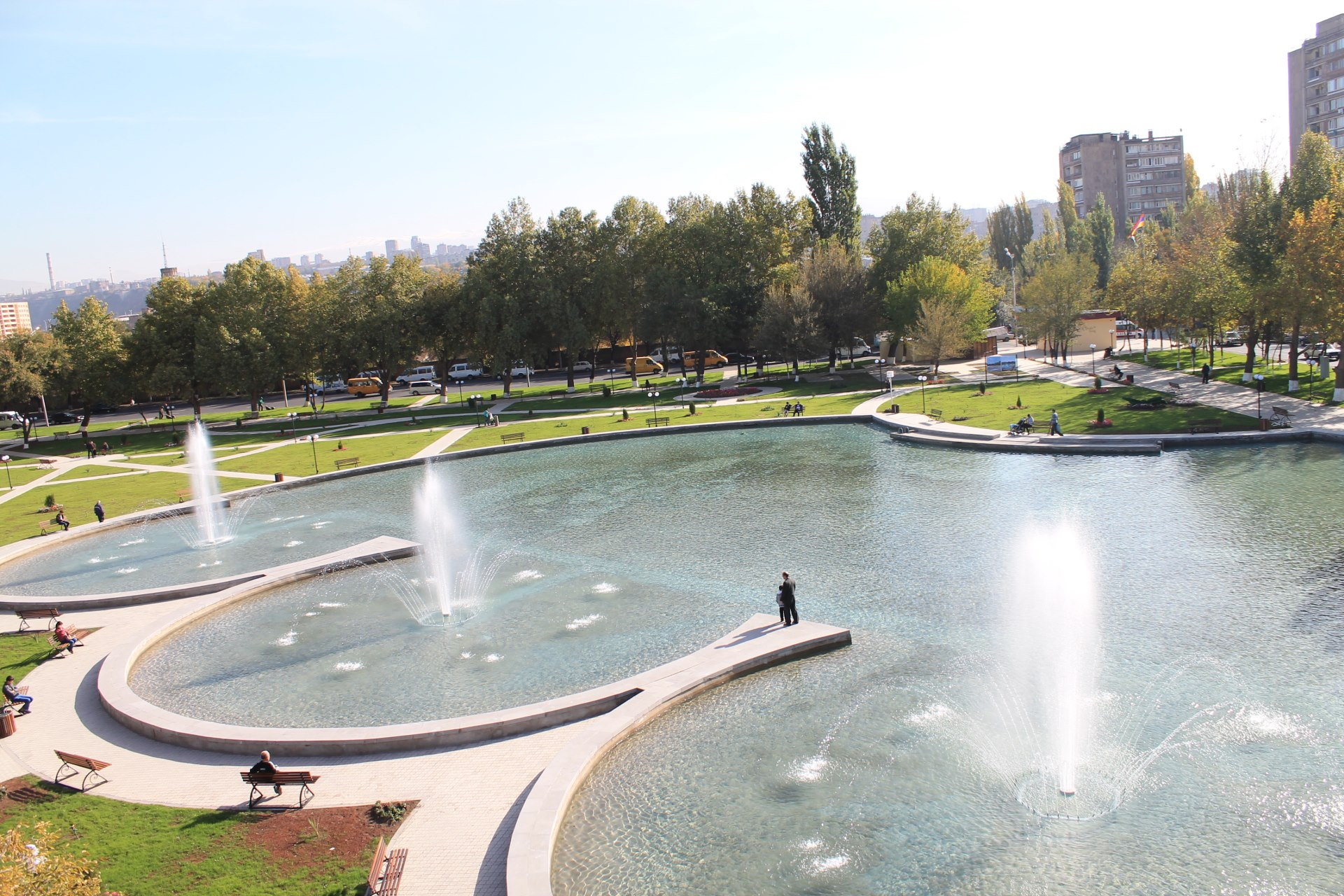
Buenos Aires Park

With an area of 25 km² (11.21% of Yerevan city area), Ajapnyak is the 4th-largest district of Yerevan in terms of area. Ajapnyak literally means 'right bank' in Armenian, which refers to the location of the district on the ri⁹ght bank of Hrazdan River. It is unofficially divided into smaller neighborhoods such as Norashen, Nazarbekyan, Silikyan, Lukashin, Vahagni, Anastasavan, kvartal 15, kvartal 16. Kevork Chavush Square and Halabyan Street form the core of the district. Other notable streets of the district are Kevork Chavush Street, Shiraz Street, Bashinjaghyan Street, Movses Silikyan Street and the Ashtarak Highway. Ajapnyak is separated from Kentron and Malatia-Sebastia by Leningradyan Street.

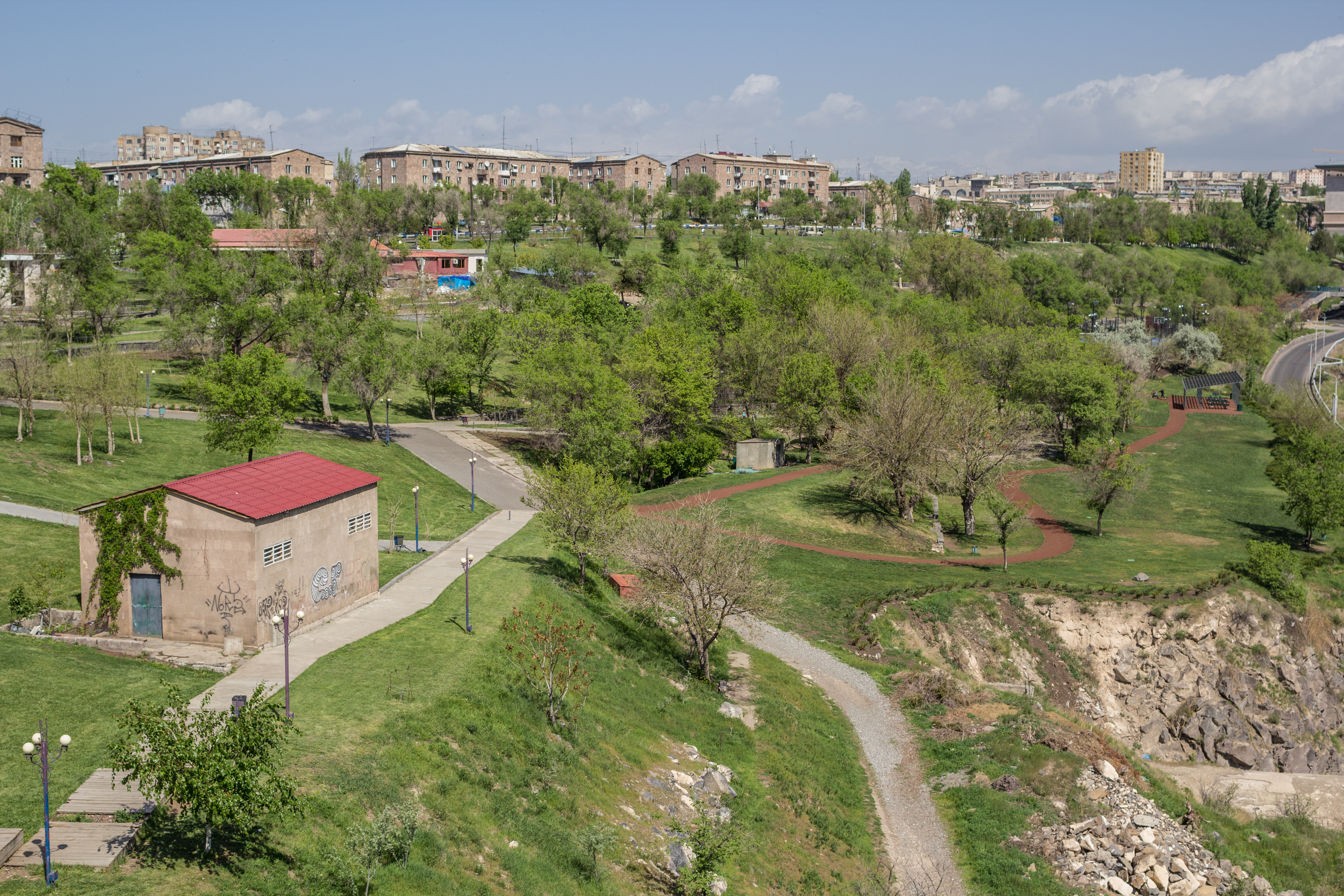
Ajapnyak as seen from Tumanyan Park

Many parks in Ajapnyak were replenished in the 2010s, becoming major destinations for the citizens of Yerevan, such as Tumanyan Park, Buenos Aires Park and Freedom Fighters' (Azatamartikneri) Park.

As of 2016, the population of the district is around 109,100.

== Demographics ==
As of the 2022 census, the district had a population of 111,508, which is 10.27% of Yerevan city population and ranked 7th among the Yerevan districts. Ajapnyak is mainly populated by Armenians who belong to the Armenian Apostolic Church. However, as of 2017, the district does not have any church building within its borders.

== Culture ==
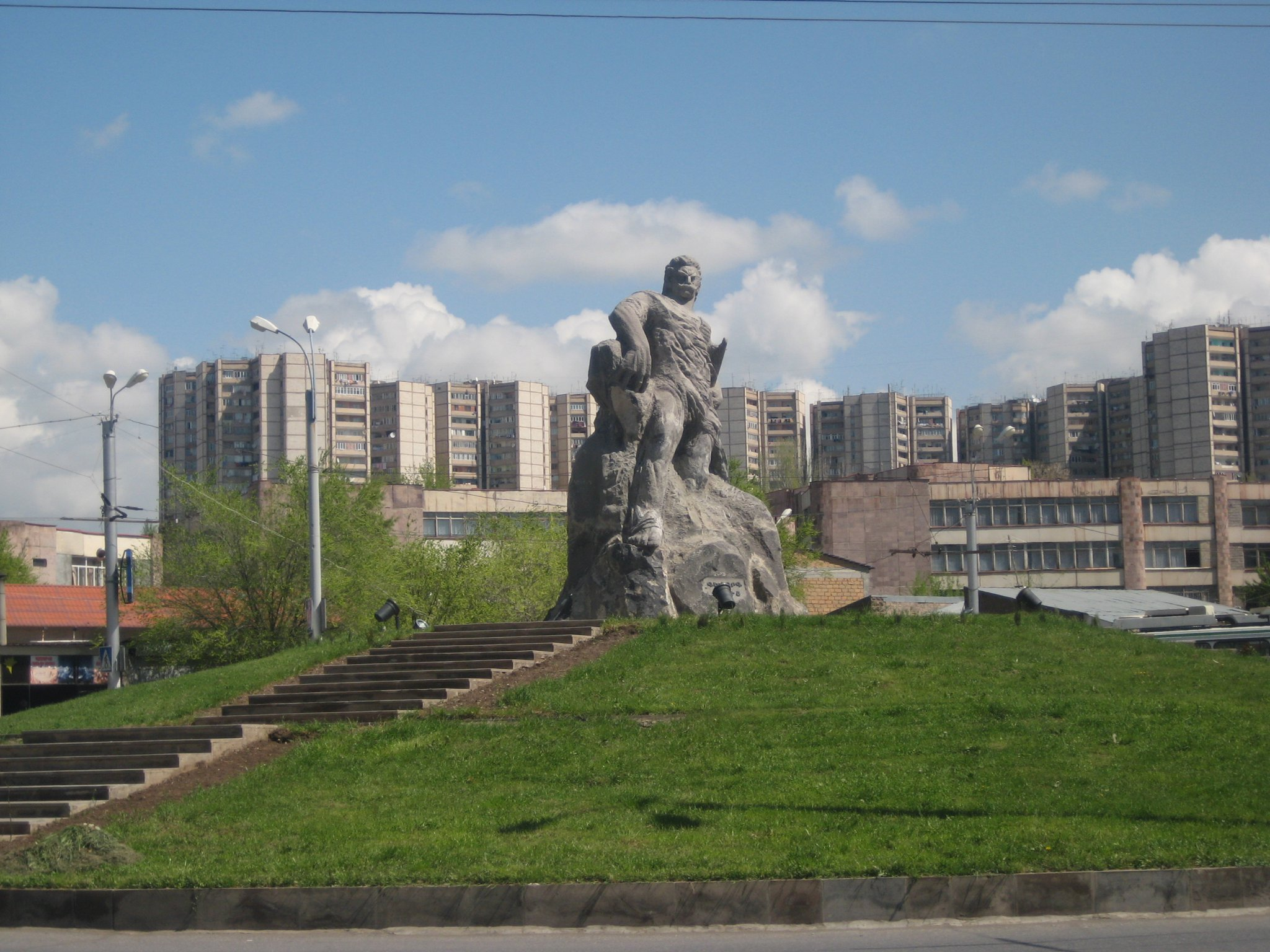
The statue of Kevork Chavush in Ajapnyak

Ajapnyak is home to Mikayel Mirzoyan Music School opened in 1957, Avet Gabrielyan Art School opened in 1971, Maratuk Cultural Centre for Ethnographic Song and Dance opened in 1983, Anahit Tsitsikyan Music School opened in 1987, Zartonk Children's Aesthetic Education Centre opened in 1995, and Ajapnyak Aesthetic Education Centre opened in 2001.

== Transportation ==
Being located on the right bank of the Hrazdan river, the district secures its connection with central Yerevan through the Great Bridge of Hrazdan. Ajapnyak is served by a public transport network of buses and trolleybuses.

== Economy ==
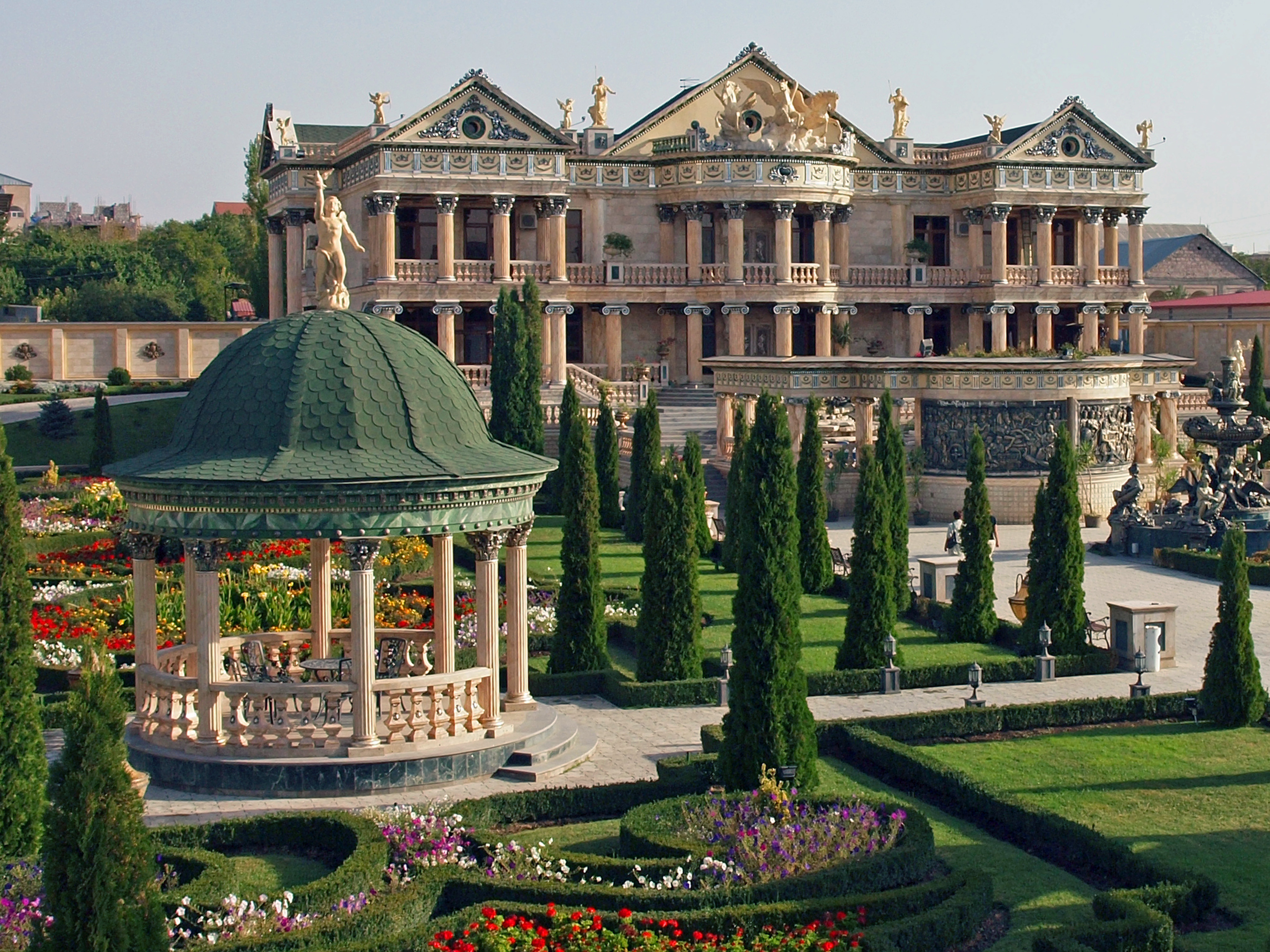
A private house in the newly founded northern neighborhoods of Ajapnyak

Ajapnyak is mainly home to small retailers and service centres with a small industrial area at the eastern side of the district, on the border with Malatia-Sebastia.

Most of the industrial plants of the district were opened in the 2000s. However, the Proshyan Brandy Factory founded in 1885, is operating in its current facilities in Ajapnyak since 1980. Many large industrial firms are currently operating in the district, such as Thermomex electronic devices plant founded in 1987, Karitas wood products plant founded 1995, Asa confectionery products plant founded in 1997, Waterlok Aparan mineral water factory founded in 2000, Prof Al aluminum structures plant founded in 2002, Biokat dairy factory founded in 2003, Profmet metal pipe plant founded in 2004, Aparan-Tan+ dairy and mineral water factory founded in 2004, Mega Shin metal and plastic structures plant founded in 2005, Elit Shant ice cream factory founded in 2007, Martin Star food manufacturing enterprise founded in 2007, Amelia mining company founded in 2008, Gary Plast factory founded in 2012, and Yerfrez factory for metal-cutting machines founded in 2016. Many other minor plants producing food products, clothes, electronic devices and building materials also operate in the district.

The district is home to the Armenia Republican Medical Centre, which is the largest hospital in Yerevan.

== Education ==
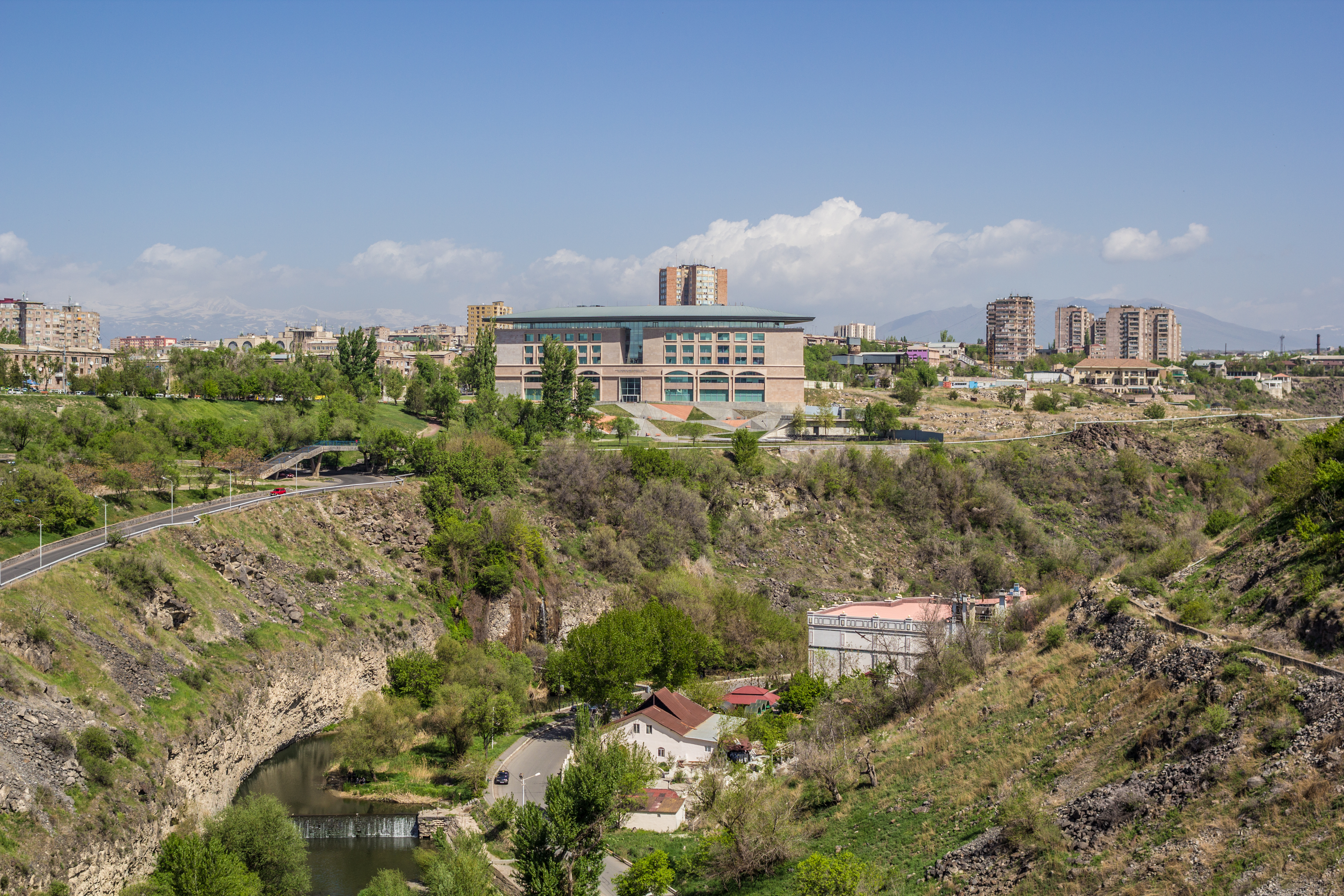
Tumo Center for Creative Technologies in Ajapnyak District situated along the Hrazdan River gorge, adjacent to Tumanyan Park

As of 2016–17, the district has 20 public schools as well as 4 private schools, among them is the prominent QSI International School of Yerevan (opened in 1995). A vocational school also operates in the district.

Many higher education institutes are operating in the district, such as Haybusak University of Yerevan (opened in 1990), and Yerevan Agricultural University (opened in 1992).

The Yerevan Physics Institute scientific research centre founded in 1943, is located in Ajapnyak. In 1993, Monte Melkonian Military Academy of the Defence Ministry of Armenia was opened in the district, followed by the Tumo Center for Creative Technologies in 2011.

== Sport ==
Ajapnyak is home to the following sport schools:

- Children's and Youth's sport school of Ajapnyak, opened in 1968, specialized handball, basketball, volleyball and chess.
- Armfighting Professional Federation, mixed martial arts training centre, opened in 2005.
- Ajapnyak Chess School, opened in 2013.

The Ararat Golf and Country Club is located at the Vahagni neighbourhood of Ajapnyak District.
