= Spandaryan =

Spandaryan may refer to:

- Spandaryan, Shirak, Armenia
- Spandaryan, Syunik, Armenia
- Spandarian Reservoir, Syunik, Armenia
- Silikyan, Yerevan, Armenia
- Suren Spandaryan, Bolshevik
