= Hakob Kojoyan =

Armenian artist (1883–1959)

Hakob Kojoyan Հակոբ Կոջոյան
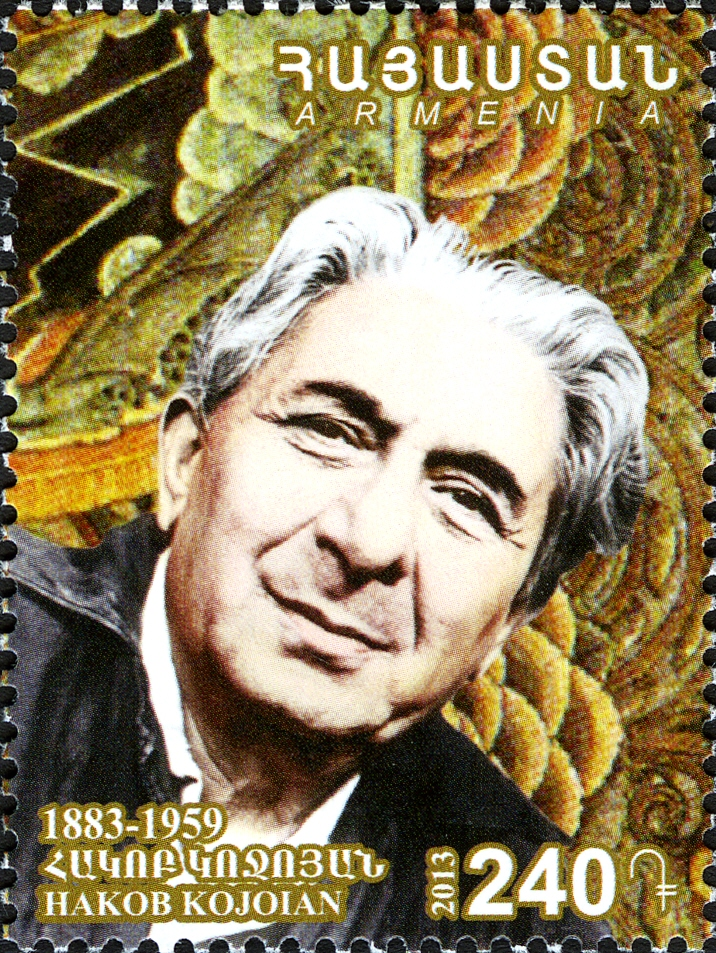
- Hakob Kojoyan on a 2013 Armenian stamp
- Born: December 13, 1883; Akhaltsikhe, Tiflis Governorate, Russian Empire
- Died: April 24, 1959 (aged 75); Yerevan, Armenian SSR, Soviet Union
- Notable work: Coat of arms of Armenia
- Movement: Painting and applied art

Hakob Kojoyan (Armenian: Հակոբ Կոջոյան; December 13, 1883 – April 24, 1959) was an Armenian artist.

He mostly worked in the genres of painting and applied art. Hakob Kojoyan assisted Armenian architect Alexander Tamanian in creating the coat of arms for the First Republic of Armenia.

== Biography ==
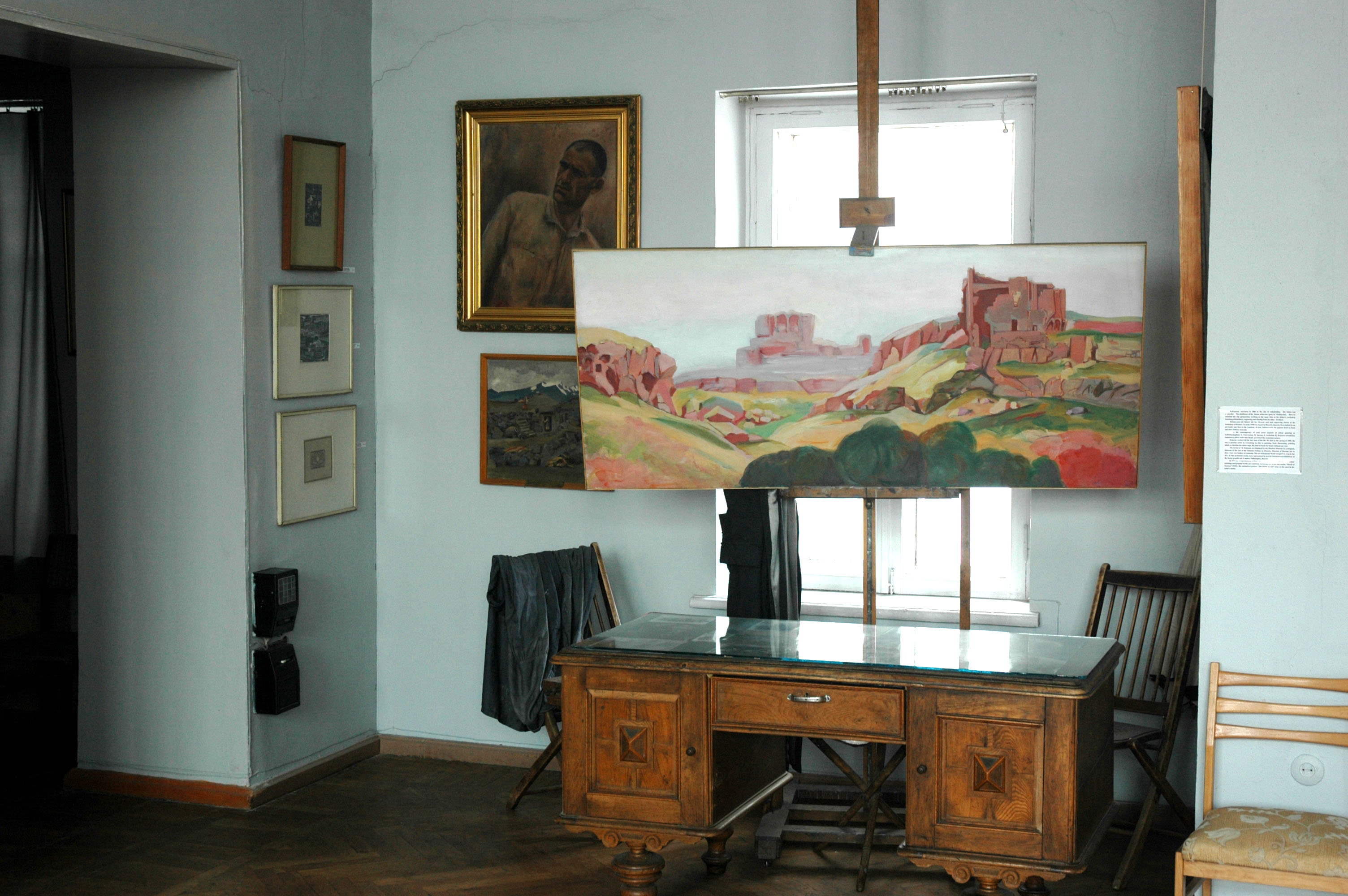
Hakob Kojoyan studio at Ara Sargsyan and Hakob Kojoyan Museum

Hakob Kojoyan was born in 1883 in Akhaltsikhe in the family of goldsmith. In 1890 his family moved to Vladikavkaz, where little Hakob attended the Craftsmen Secondary School. Meanwhile, he learned goldsmith craft at his father's workshop. During those years he was also involved in painting with the help of Ossetian painter Makharbek Tuganov. After graduating from high school, he left for Moscow to learn more jewelry skills where he studied at Prusov's jewelry studio.

In 1903 Kojoyan left for Germany. In Munich, he studied at Hashbury Studio and later at the Academy of Fine Arts. The "Self-portrait" created by him during these years is distinguished by its drawing, generalized reproduction of forms and virtuoso coloring. Here we see a young, self-confident young man. Graduating from the academy, he left for Paris and lived there until 1909. In Europe, he not only explored the remarkable collections of the past, but also witnessed for the creation of new paintings that have a significant influence on him to become an artist. After returning to his native land he found out there unfavorable conditions for his creative work. By the beginning of World War I, the artist went to the front. At the front he received the news of the Armenian genocide, which brought great pain and anguish to the artist.

In 1918 he left for Armenia. During those years, as an artist, he participated in the excavations of Ani and copied the frescoes of the Church of the Savior (13th century), exploring the national artistic principles of Ani's monuments. After the establishment of Soviet rule in Armenia in 1920 Kojoyan, along with several other Armenian artists, was involved in the art department of "Haykavrosta" and had created agitation-propagandistic posters, caricatures, and so on according to the sample of the "ROSTA Window" (Moscow).

In 1921 Kojoyan went to Tabriz, where the artist studied the culture of the ancient eastern country of Persia, and began to take an active part in the cultural life of the local Armenian community. Kojoyan gave lectures at the Art Studio organized by Alexander Tamanian. In 1922 he returned to the Armenian SSR. During those years the cultural life in Yerevan was flourishing, the School of Fine Arts was founded by the Society of Fine Arts Workers of Armenia with its departments of painting, sculpture and applied arts. Artists were involved in the works of the Haypethrat, the State Theater and the press. In 1939 Kojoyan participated in a ten-day exhibition of Armenian art in Moscow and was awarded the Order of the Red Banner of Labour, meanwhile he received the title of People's Artist of the Republic.

In 1945 with the endeavours of Ara Sargsyan, the Institute of Fine Arts was opened in Yerevan with the Faculty of Painting and Sculpture, where Kojoyan worked as a professor.

In 1959 an exhibition dedicated to the 75th anniversary of the painter was opened in Yerevan (afterwards in Tbilisi, Baku, Moscow, Saint Petersburg). The exhibition was still on in Saint Petersburg, when Kojoyan suddenly fell ill and died in Yerevan. Secondary School of Fine Arts named after Kojoyan was opened in Yerevan in 1963.

In 1973 the two-storey private residence of sculptor Ara Sargsyan and painter Hakob Kojoyan where they lived since 1934 started to operate as house-museum for 2 artists.
