= King of the Forest (sculpture) =

Statue of King of the forest (Dilijan)
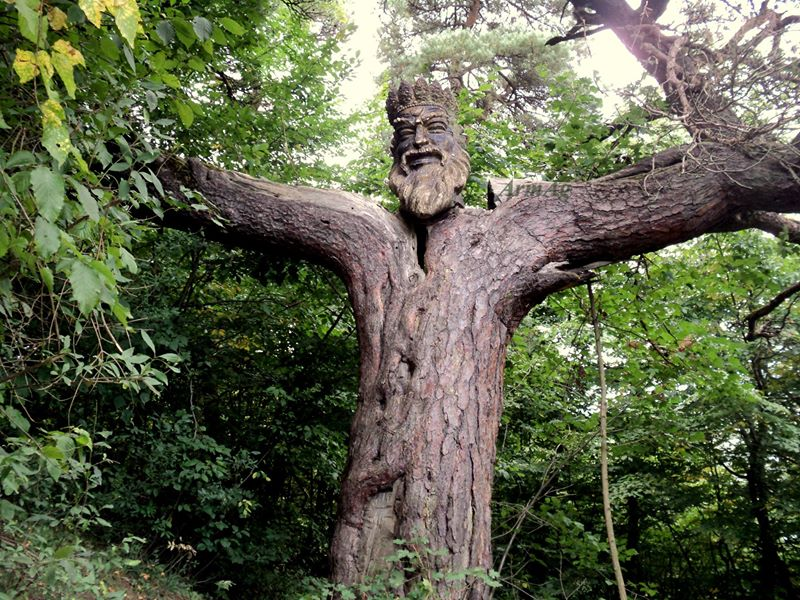
- Statue of King of the forest (Dilijan)
- Location: Dilijan, Tavush Region, Armenia

History
- Built: 1967

Site notes
- Sculptor: Ara Sargsian

Statue of King of the forest (Dilijan) (Armenian: Անտառի արքա (քանդակ, Դիլիջան)) is a monumental tree statue in Armenia. It is situated in the territory of Aghasi Khanjian's summer residence in Dilijan, Tavush Region.

== History ==
In 1966, Ara Sargsian, came with his family, to visit Aghasi Khanjian's summer residence in Dilijan. While walking around the forest, Sargsian noticed a giant tree with spread branches, resembling a human spreading his arms. In 1923, Ara Sarkissian had created the "Dragonfly" ("Greek mythology") as a divine image of the forest. In 1967, Ara Sargsian transformed it into a new look and called the King of the Forest.

In 2013, the statue was beheaded and the Dilijan Aarhus Center rebuilt the sculpture.

== Description ==
The king's crowned head stands on the wings of a pine tree.

== Gallery ==
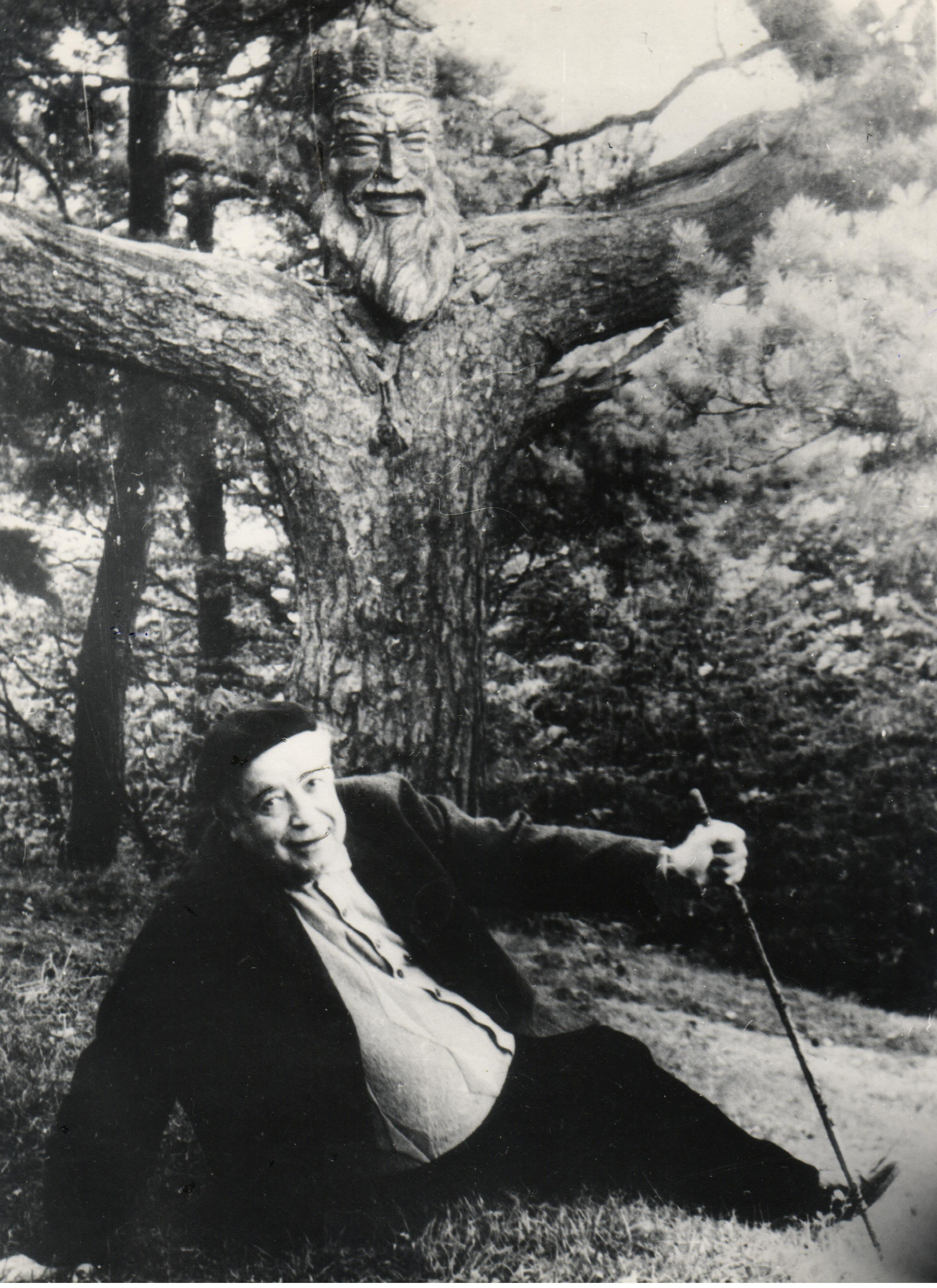
Ara Sargsyan at the "Forest of the Forest", 1968

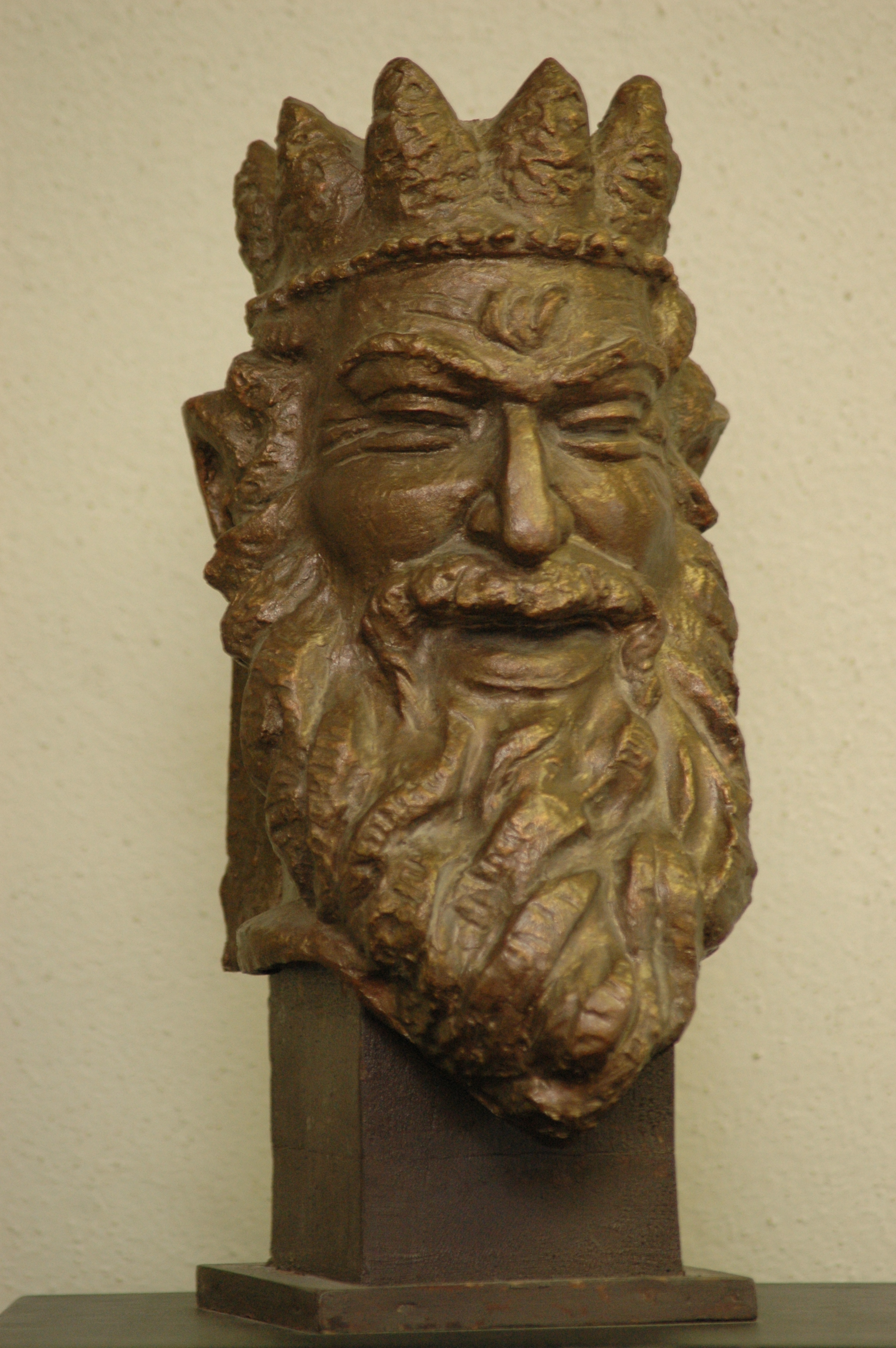
The clay cemetery of the "King of the Forest" in the House-Museum of Ara Sargsyan and Hakob Kojoyan

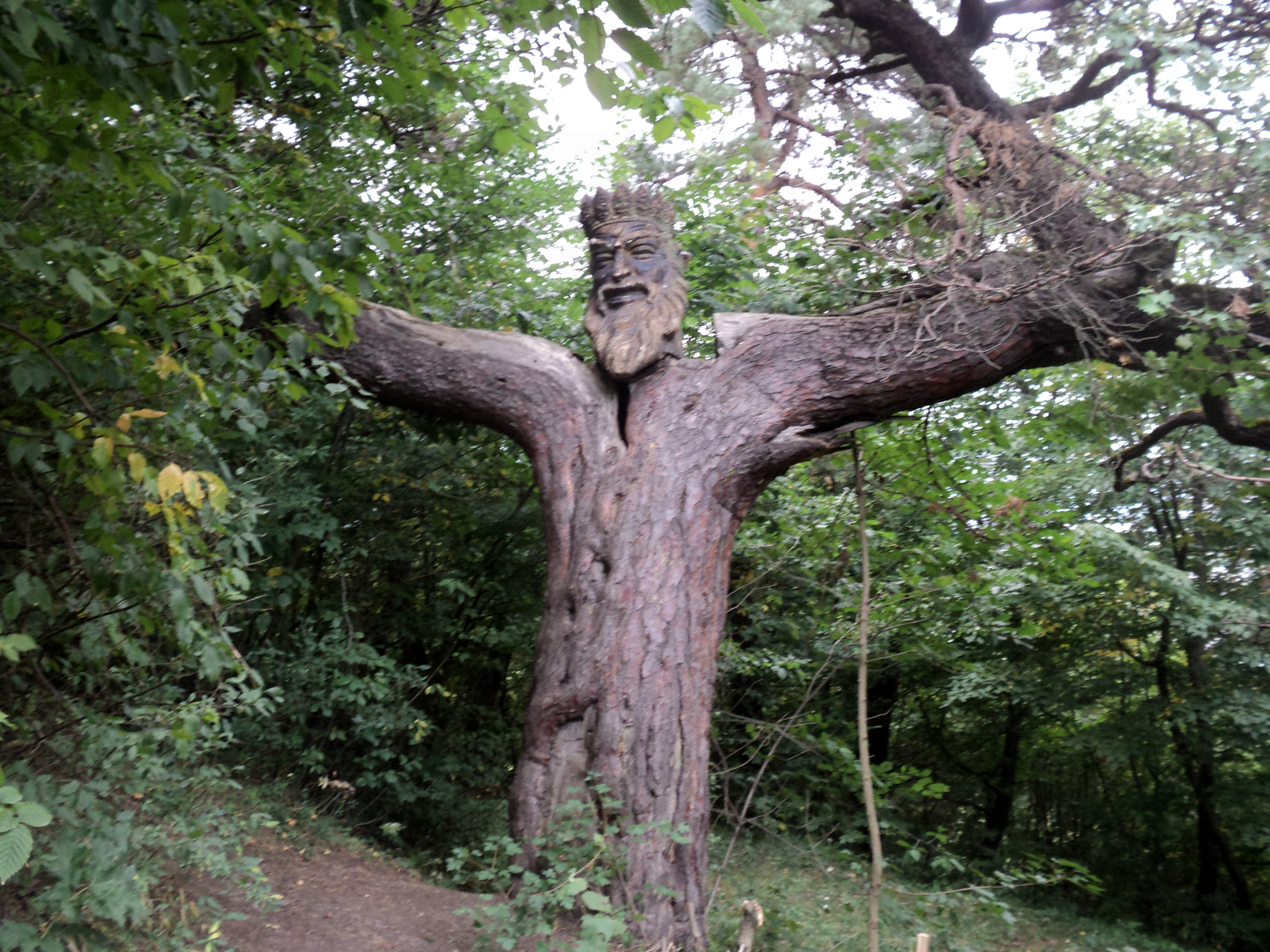

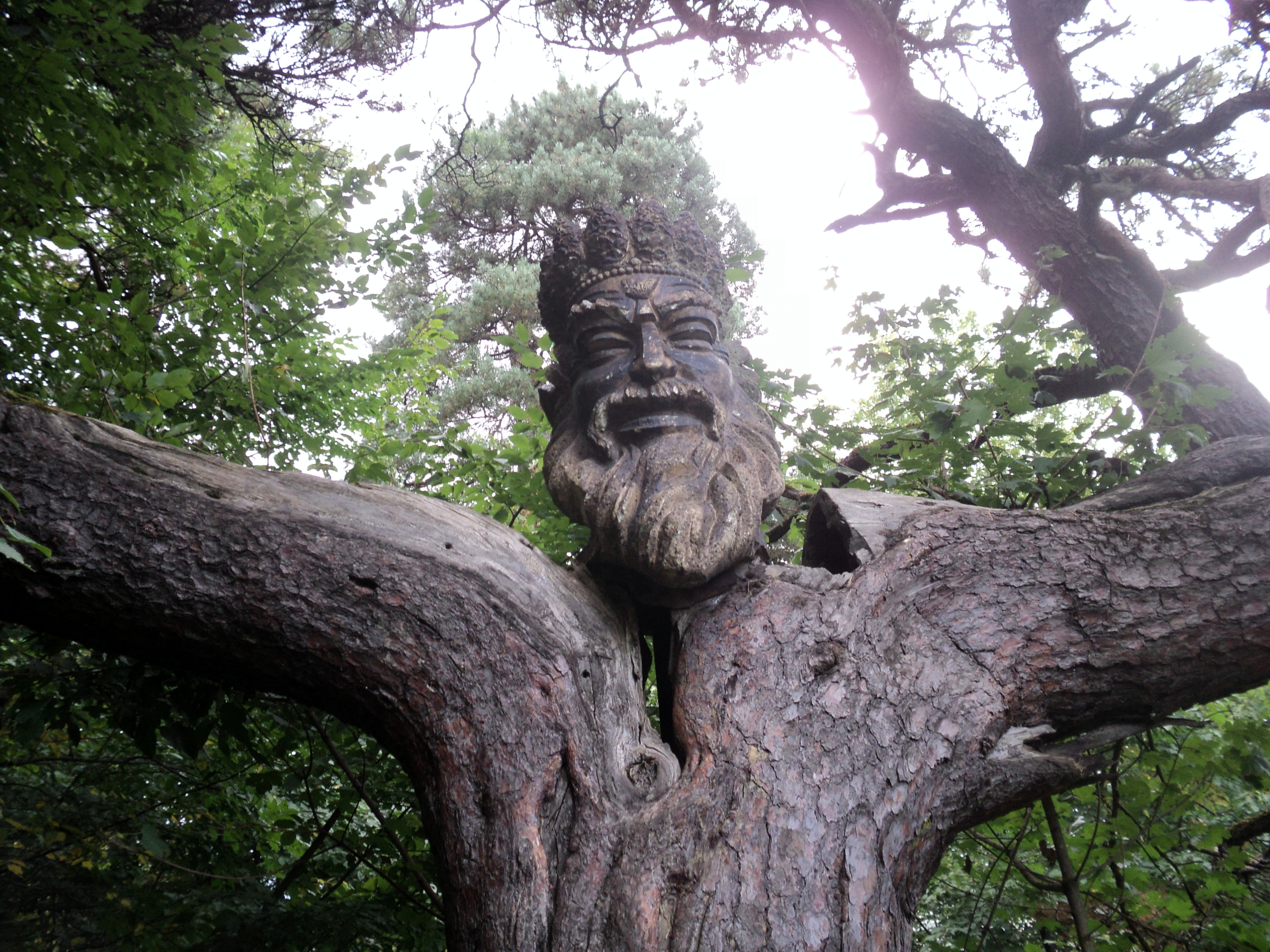
