= Anastasavan =

- Location within Armenia
- Coordinates: 40°13′09″N 44°28′46″E
- Country: Armenia
- Marz (Province): Yerevan
- District: Ajapnyak
- Time zone: UTC+4 ( )
  - Summer (DST): UTC+5 ( )

Anastasavan (Armenian: Անաստասավան) is a town in the Yerevan Province of Armenia.
