= Lukashin, Yerevan =

Lukashin
- Location within Armenia
- Coordinates: 40°11′53″N 44°27′04″E
- Country: Armenia
- Province: Yerevan
- District: Ajapnyak

Lukashin (Armenian: Լուկաշին) is a neighbourhood in Yerevan, the capital of Armenia.

It was named after Sargis Lukashin (1883-1937), president of the Armenian Council of People's Commissars.
