= Tumanyan Park =

Park in Yerevan, Armenia

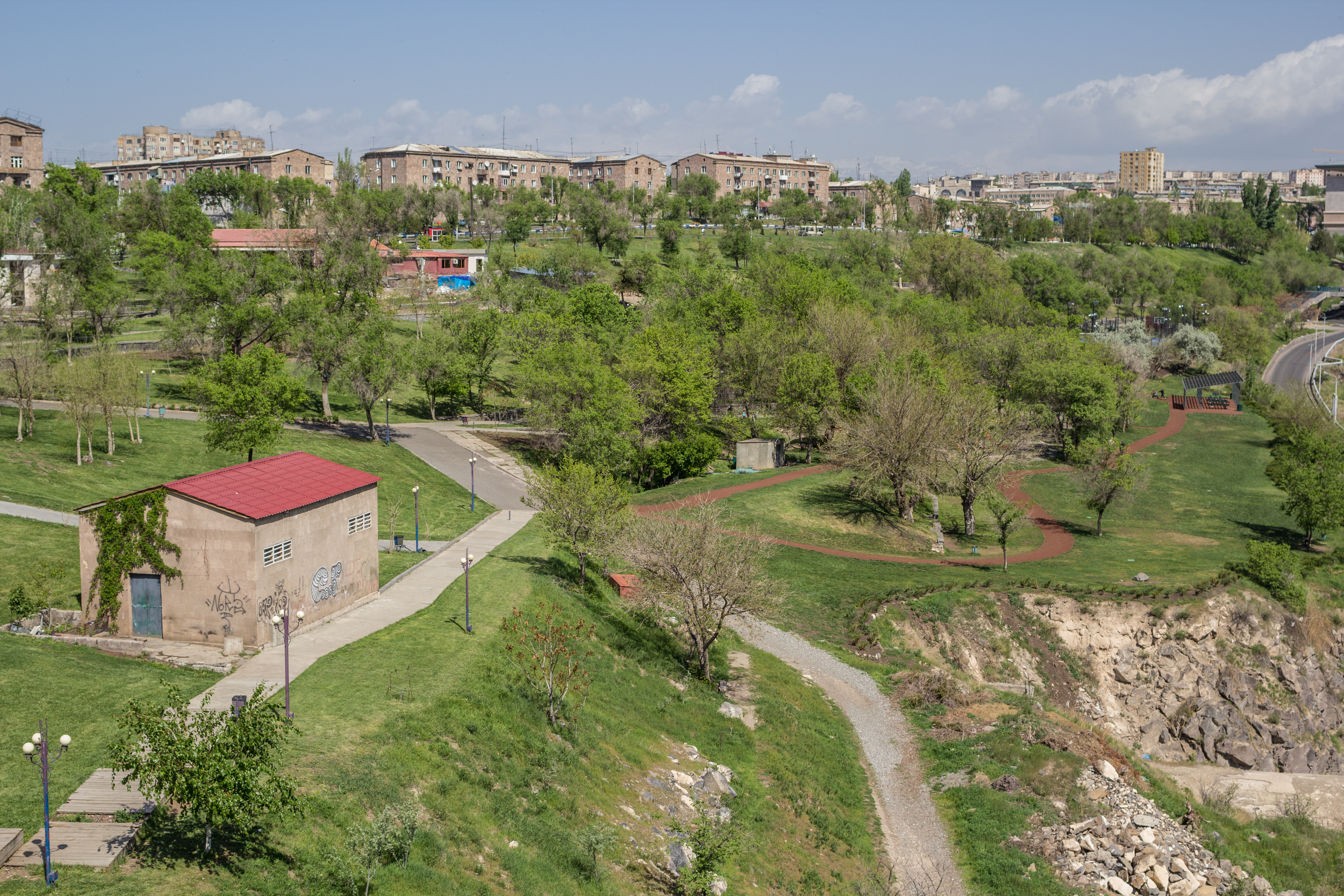
- Tumanyan Park situated along the Hrazdan River gorge
- Interactive map of Tumanyan Park
- Type: Public
- Location: Ajapnyak district, Yerevan, Armenia
- Coordinates: 40°11′32″N 44°28′47″E
- Area: 7 hectares (17 acres)
- Created: 1970
- Operator: Yerevan City Council
- Status: Open all year

Tumanyan Park (Armenian: Թումանյան Այգի) is a public park in the Ajapnyak district of Yerevan, Armenia. It is located on Halabyan Street in the gorge of Hrazdan River, between the Great Bridge of Hrazdan and the Tumo Center for Creative Technologies. It was opened in 1970 and occupies an area of 7 hectares on the right bank of Hrazdan River. It was opened and named after the writer and poet Hovhannes Tumanyan on the 100th anniversary of his birth.

In 1973, the statues of the two main characters of Tumanyan's Anoush opera; Anoush and Saro were erected in the park.

In 1986, another statue of Tumanyan's fictional character Loretsi Sako was erected in the park.

Tumanyan Park is among the attractive playgrounds for the children of Yerevan.

== Gallery ==
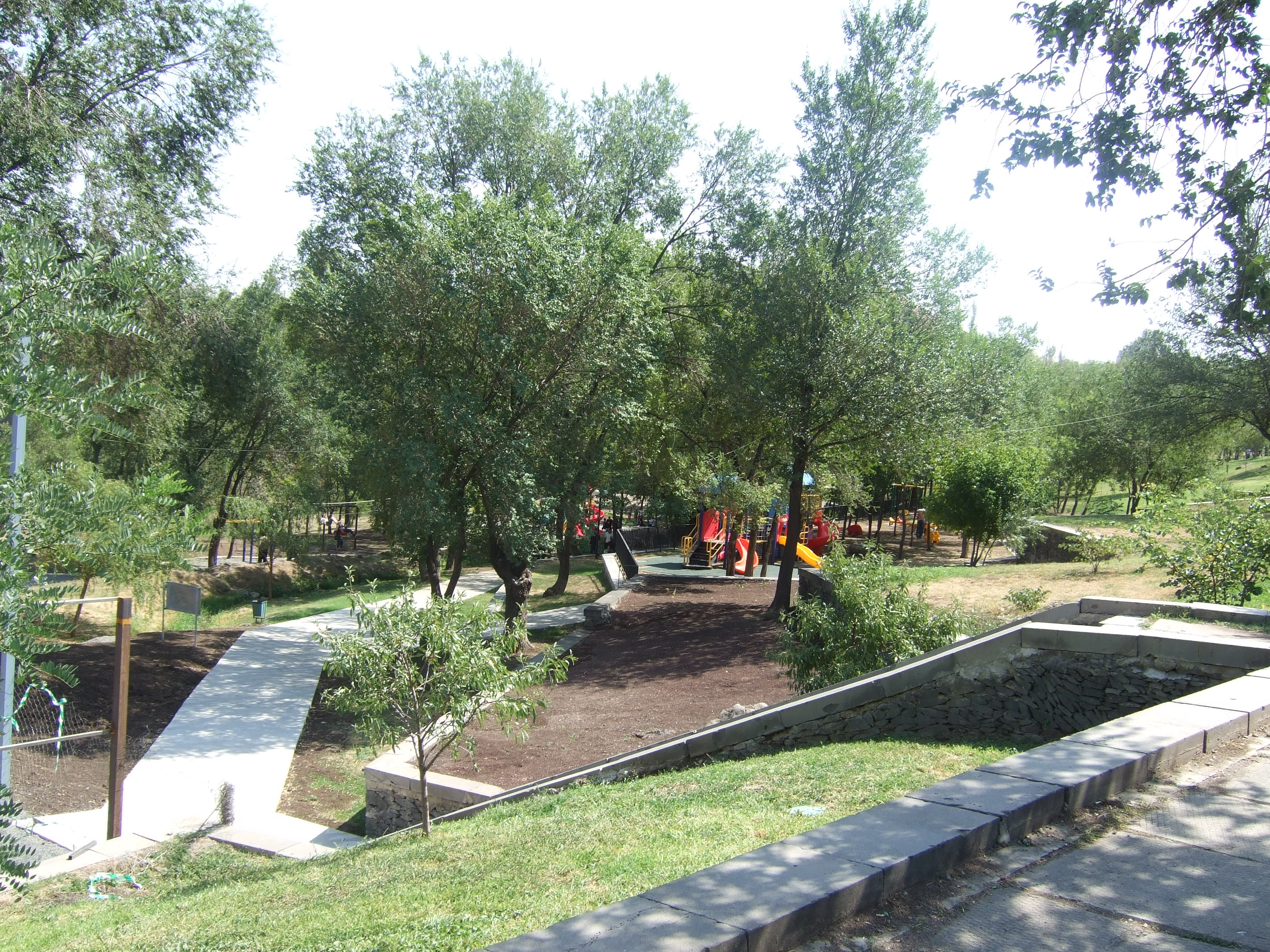
View from the park

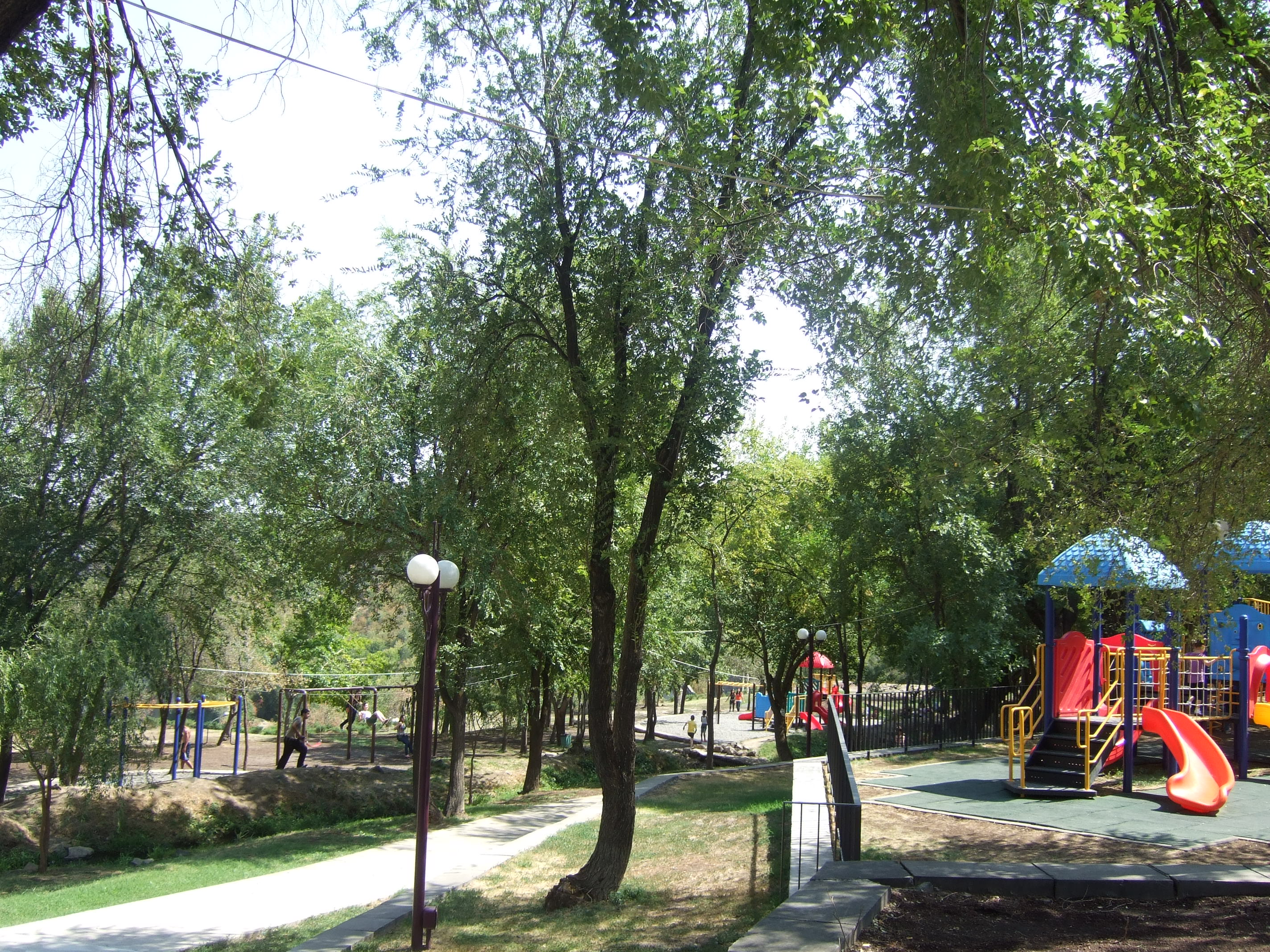
Children's playground

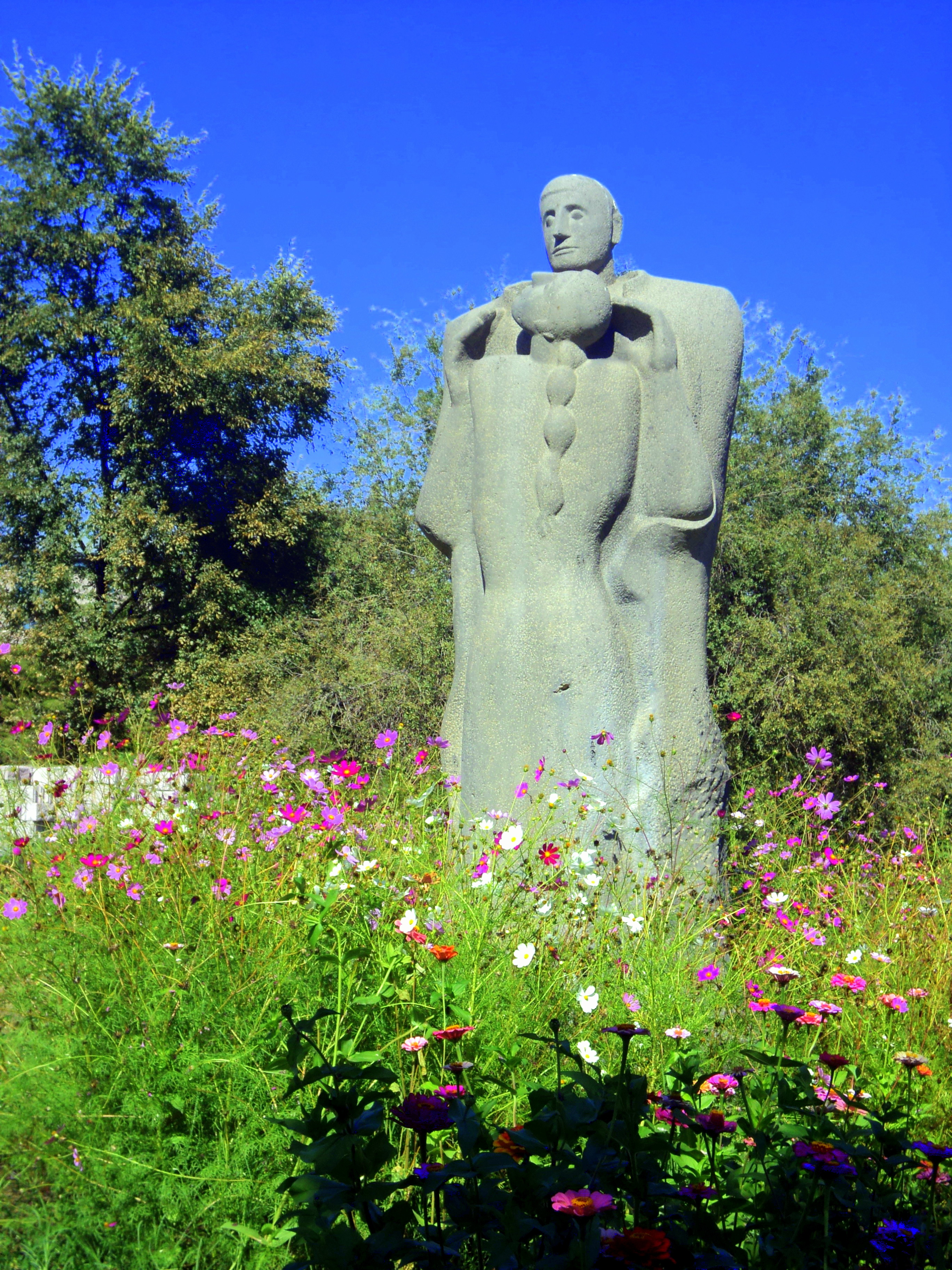
Anoush and Saro

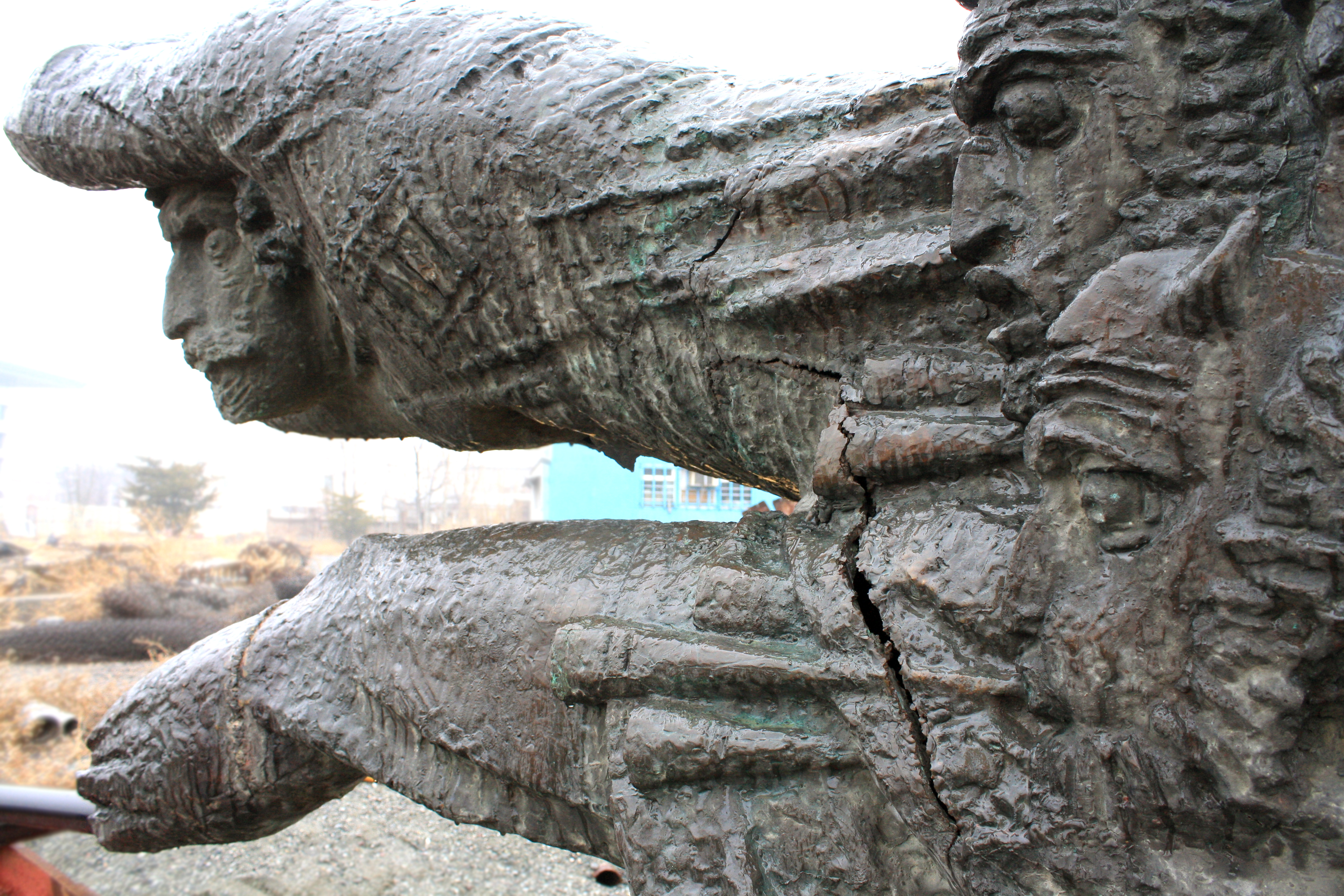
Loretsi Sako
