= Buenos Aires Park =

Park in Yerevan, Armenia

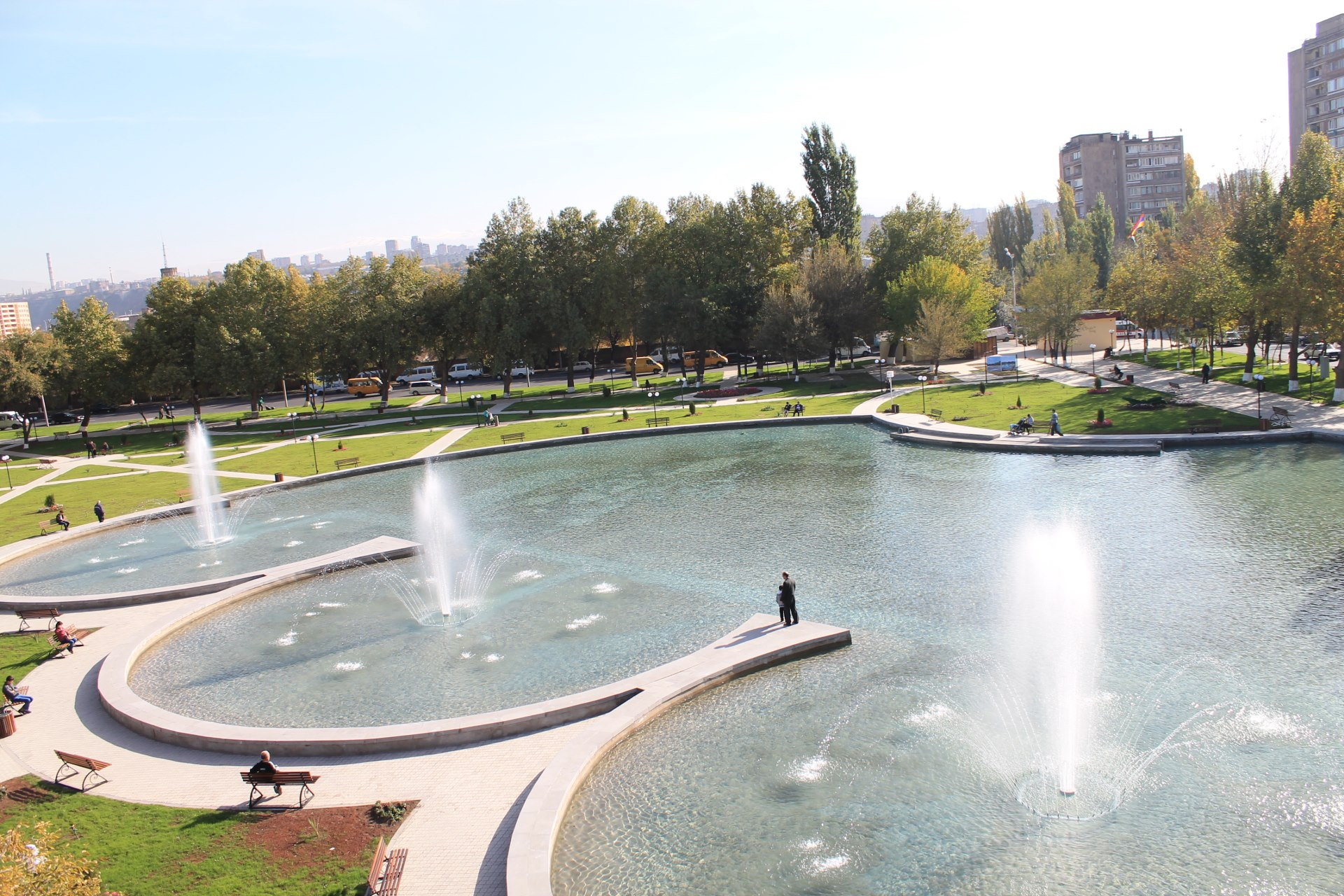
- Buenos Aires Park
- Interactive map of Buenos Aires Park
- Type: Public
- Location: Ajapnyak District, Yerevan, Armenia
- Coordinates: 40°12′21″N 44°28′47″E
- Area: 4 hectares (9.9 acres)
- Created: 2012
- Operator: Yerevan City Council
- Status: Open all year

Buenos Aires Park (Armenian: Բուենոս Այրեսի այգի (Buenos Ayresi aygi)) is a public park in the Ajapnyak District of Yerevan, Armenia. It is located at the northeastern corner of Halabyan-Margaryan intersection, near the Armenia Republican Medical Centre, on the left bank of Hrazdan River.

The abandoned park near the Armenia Republican Medical Centre was renovated during summer 2012 and named after Buenos Aires which is twinned with Yerevan since 2000. With an area of around 4 hectares, the park was officially opened on 30 October 2012. The park has a half-circular central pool with fountains and an area of 3,000 m^{3} of water surface. The park is also provided with a small space for outdoor sporting events.

The park is the regular training venue of the Street Workout Armenia.
