= Grigor Aghababyan =

Soviet Armenian architect (1911–1977)

- Գրիգոր Աղաբաբյան
- Born: Grigor Garegini Aghababyan; 12 June 1911; Alexandrapol (now Gyumri), Caucasus Viceroyalty, Russian Empire
- Died: 9 October 1977 (aged 66); Goris, Armenian SSR, USSR
- Burial place: Tokhmakh cemetery, Yerevan, Armenia
- Other name: Grigoriy Gareginovich Agababyan
- Education: National Polytechnic University of Armenia
- Occupation: Architect

Grigor Garegini Aghababyan (Armenian: Գրիգոր Աղաբաբյան, Russian: Григорий Гарегинович Агабабян; 1911–1977) was a Soviet Armenian architect. His most notable works include the Great Bridge of Hrazdan (1949–1956) in Yerevan, and the Yerevan Central Covered Market (1952).

== Biography ==
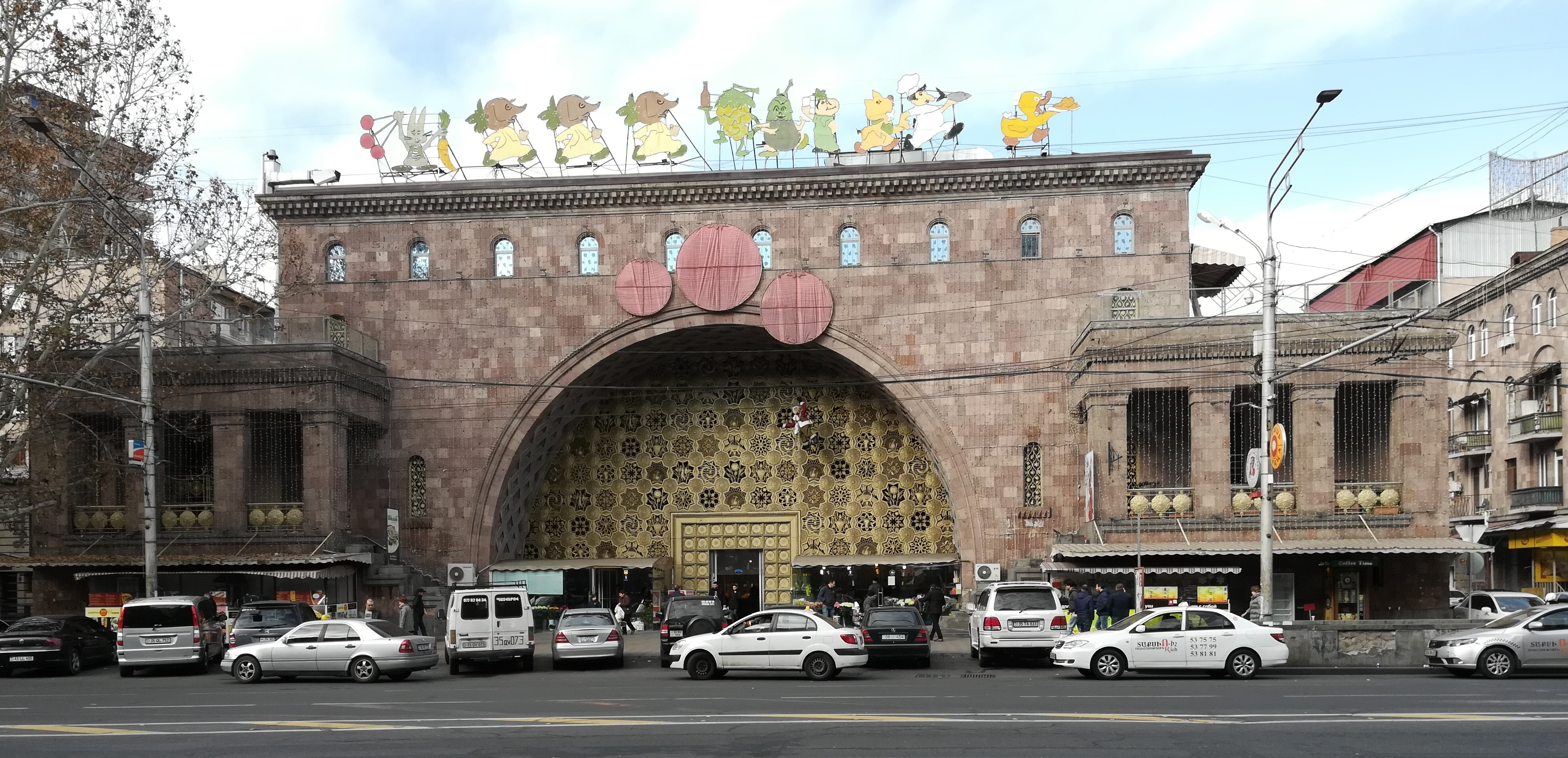
Yerevan Central Covered Market (1952)

Grigor Garegini Aghababyan was born on 12 June 1911, in Alexandrapol (now Gyumri), Caucasus Viceroyalty, Russian Empire. He graduated from National Polytechnic University of Armenia in 1937.

From 1950 until 1959, Aghababyan was the chief architect of Yerevan, and from 1959 until 1977 he was the chairman of the state construction committee of the Armenian Soviet Socialist Republic. He died on 9 October 1977.

He was awarded the title of Corresponding Member of the USSR Academy of Construction and Architecture (1957); Honored Worker of Art of the Armenian SSR in 1961; and Honored Architect of the Armenian SSR in 1968.

== Works ==
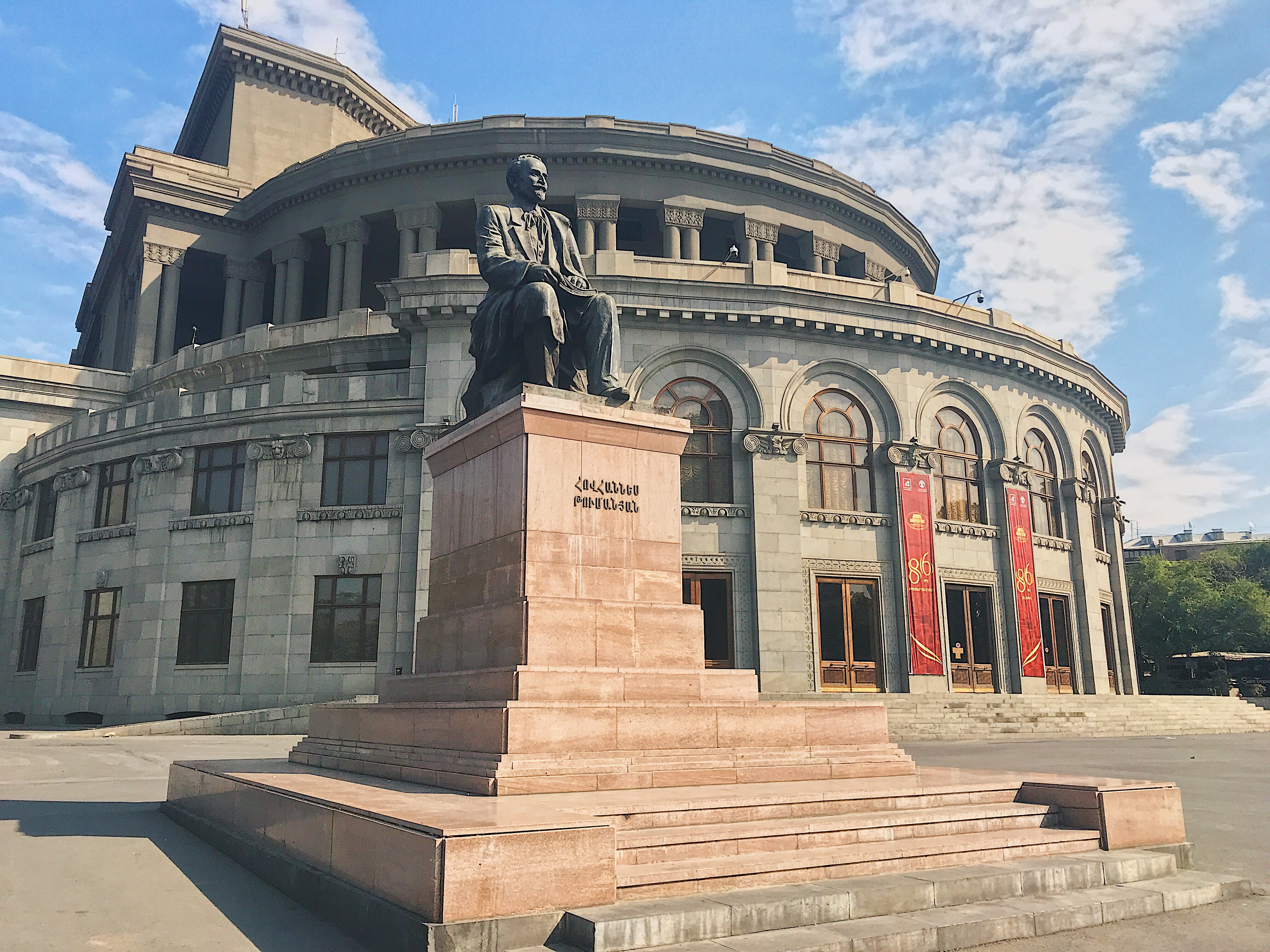
Monument to Hovhannes Tumanyan (1957), Yerevan; sculpture by Ara Sargsyan

- 1943, John Kirakosyan School No. 20, Yerevan
- 1952, Yerevan Central Covered Market, Yerevan
- 1953, Hovhannes Tumanyan Museum, Yerevan
- 1956, Great Bridge of Hrazdan, Yerevan
- 1957, Monument to Hovhannes Tumanyan, Yerevan, as architect; sculpture by Ara Sargsyan
