= Great Bridge of Hrazdan =

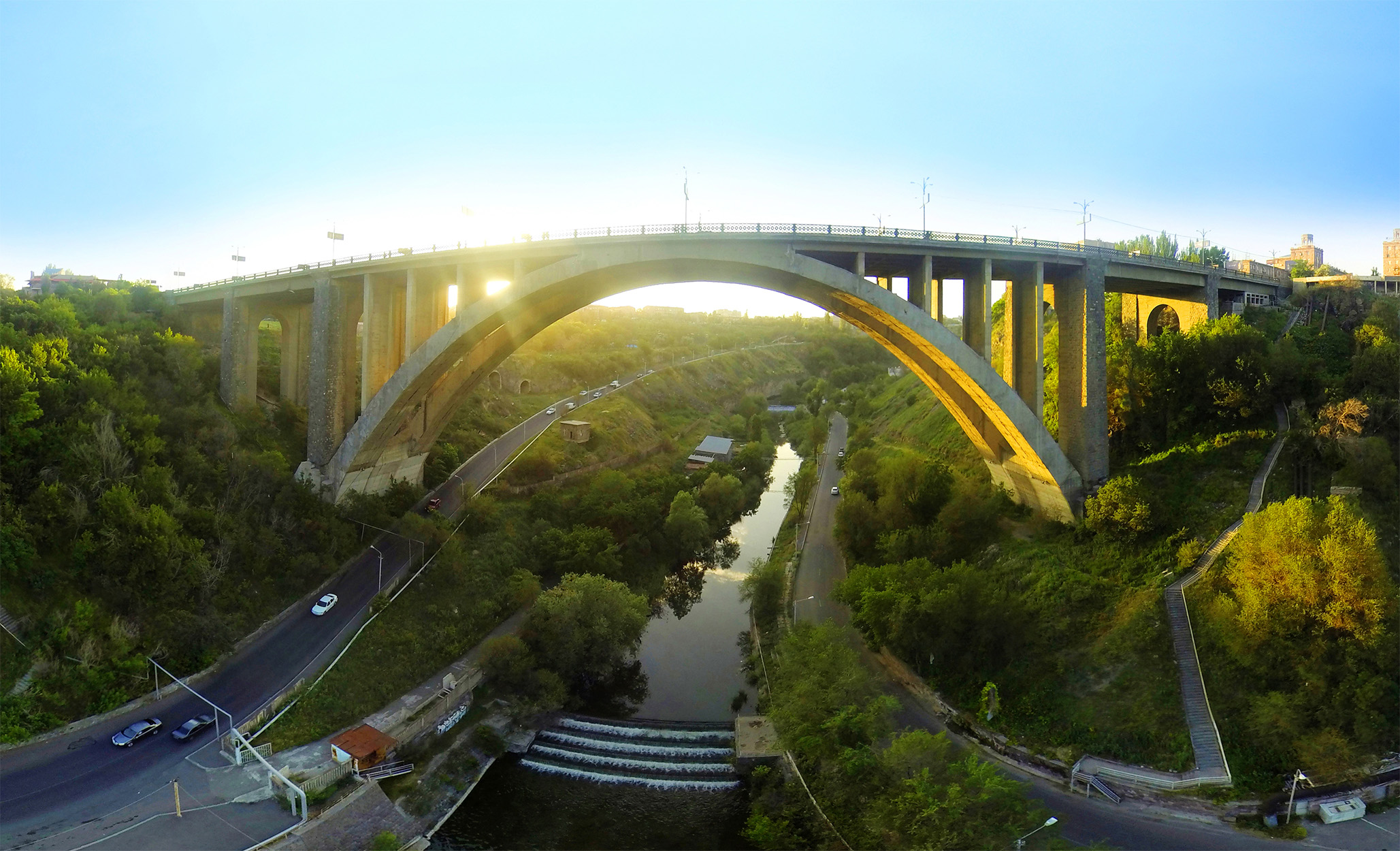
- Great Bridge of Hrazdan
- Coordinates: 40°11′29″N 44°28′56″E
- Crosses: Hrazdan River
- Locale: Yerevan

Characteristics
- Total length: 335 m (1,099.1 ft)
- Width: 26 m (85.3 ft)
- Height: 60.5 m (198.5 ft)
- Longest span: 115 m (377.3 ft)

History
- Opened: 1956

Statistics
- Daily traffic: Dual carriageway

Location
- Interactive map of Great Bridge of Hrazdan

The Great Bridge of Hrazdan (Armenian: Հրազդանի Մեծ կամուրջ), more commonly known as Kievian Bridge (Armenian: Կիևյան կամուրջ), is an arch bridge for traffic linking across the Hrazdan River in Yerevan, Armenia. It connects the Kievian street of Arabkir district with the Leningradian street of Ajapnyak District. It was designed by architect Grigor Aghababyan and constructed between 1949 and 1956.

The Karen Demirchyan Complex and the Tumanyan Park are located around the bridge.
