= Hovhannes Tumanyan Museum =

Literary museum of Hovhannes Tumanyan, Yerevan

- Հովհաննես Թումանյանի թանգարան
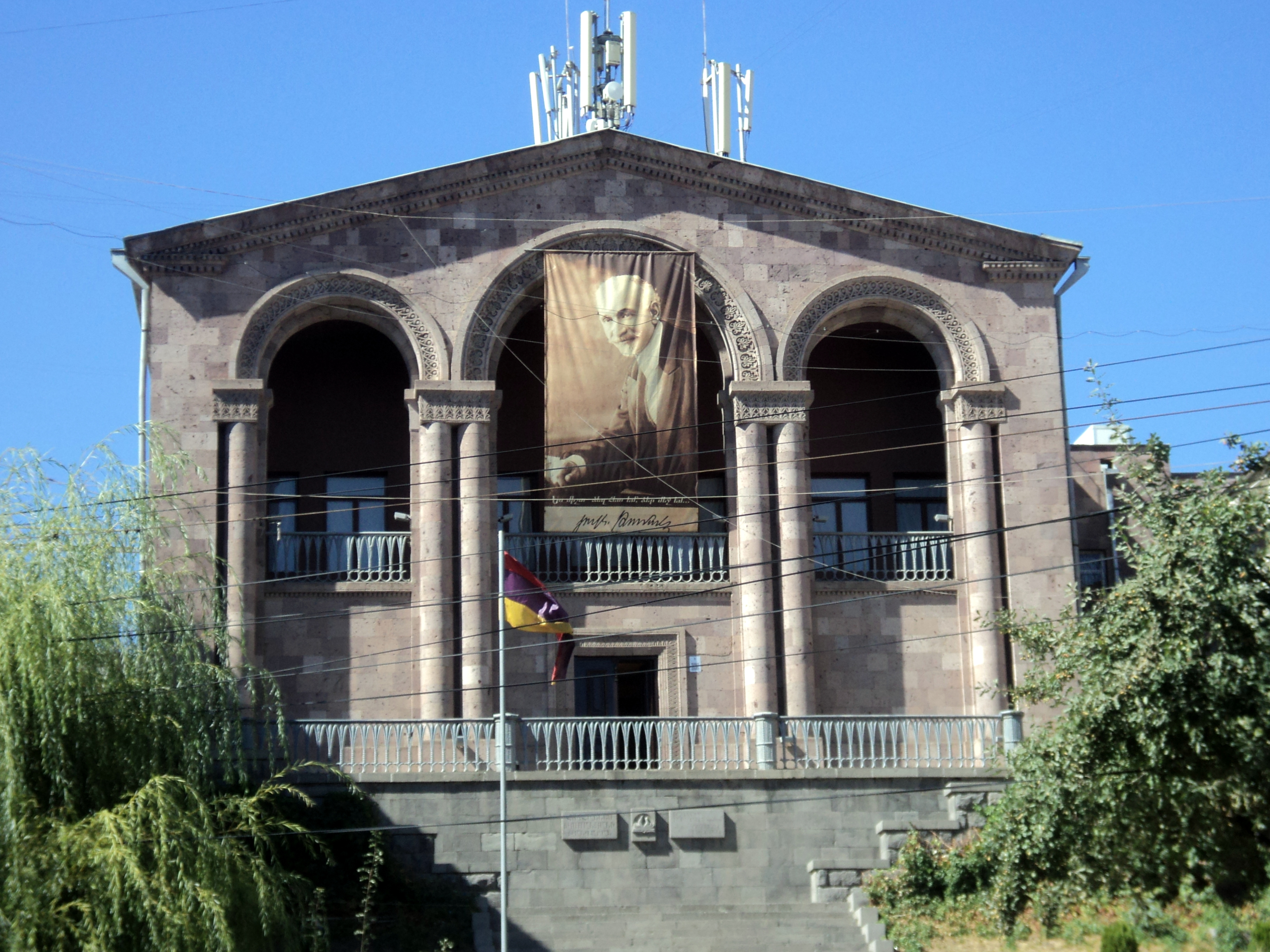
- Established: April 5, 1953
- Location: Moskovyan 40, Yerevan, Armenia
- Coordinates: 40°11′16″N 44°30′36″E
- Key holdings: Hovhannes Tumanyan
- Architect: Grigor Aghababyan

Hovhannes Tumanyan Museum (Armenian: Հովհաննես Թումանյանի թանգարան) is a literary museum based in Yerevan, Armenia. It was founded on April 5, 1953, dedicated to the 30th anniversary of the death of one of the most famous Armenian poets Hovhannes Tumanyan. The architect of the museum is Grigor Aghababyan.

== About ==
The museum is located on a hill, in the center of Yerevan, at Moskovyan 40, and to get to the museum you need to climb 54 steps, which is the number symbolizing the years of the great poet's life.

The founder and first director of the museum is the poet's daughter, Ashkhen Tumanyan. The exhibits of the museum are copies of manuscripts, photo documents and originals of Tumanyan's original works. More than 18,000 exhibits are stored here. The samples displayed in the new exhibition hall in 1969 are mainly dedicated to the life and works of Tumanyan. Those interested in Tumanyan's creative art can see the writer's personal belongings, documents, manuscripts, sketches and publications in more than 45 languages.
