= Silikyan =

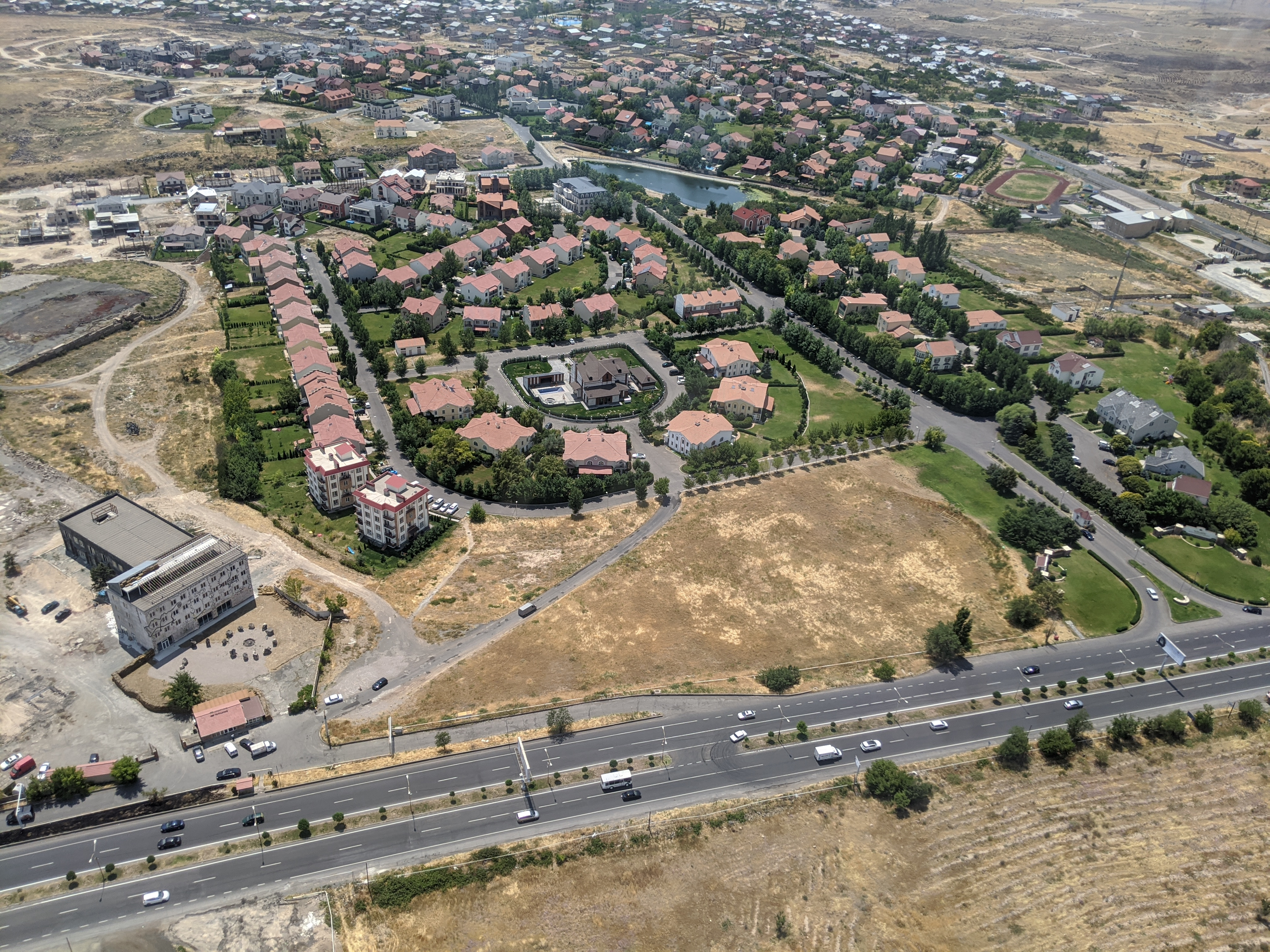

- Location within Armenia
- Coordinates: 40°12′41″N 44°26′21″E
- Country: Armenia
- Marz (Province): Yerevan
- District: Ajapnyak
- Time zone: UTC+4 ( )

Silikyan, formerly Spandaryan, is a neighbourhood of the Ajapnyak District of the Armenian capital Yerevan

With a population of more than 10,000, the neighbourhood is located at the northwest of the city.
