= QSI International School of Yerevan =

- Միջազգային Որակյալ Դպրոցներ Երևան
- "Success For All"

Location
- Ashtarak Highway 49/15; Yerevan; Armenia; 40°13′24″N 44°26′51″E

Information
- School type: non-profit Private
- Motto: "Success For All"
- Established: 1995
- Founders: Jim Gilson, Duane Root
- Staff: 52
- Grades: Preschool through Secondary
- Gender: co-educational
- Age range: 3-18
- Average class size: 10
- Education system: North American, AP
- Hours in school day: 8
- Classrooms: 12
- Campus size: 312
- Colors: Blue and Gold
- Slogan: Success breeds success
- Athletics: Football, track and field, cross country, volleyball, dance, gymnastics
- Sports: Football, Basketball, Volleyball, Track and Field, Cross Country
- Mascot: Bear
- Nickname: Bears
- Team name: QSI Bears
- Accreditation: MSA/CESS (2000-present)
- Website: yerevan.qsi.org

QSI International School of Yerevan (QSIY) is an international school in Armenia, part of Quality Schools International, the largest non-profit international school group in the world. It is an independent, coeducational day school that offers an education to children from over 20 nationalities ages 3 to 18. QSI International School of Yerevan was founded in 1995 and the QSI school group was founded in 1971 by Jim Gilson and Duane Root.

QSI's foundation makes QSI unique. They are one of the reasons that QSI teachers and graduates are known for.

QSI International School of Yerevan is the school of choice for diplomats and business people in Yerevan. Acceptance is competitive.

The school is accredited by the MSA/CESS since 2000.

== Facilities ==
The school moved to a new location during August 1999 and was above the office of a furniture factory. It remained there until early 2011. The school relocated to a new purpose-built multi-story location in February 2011.

The new building contains classrooms for ages 3–4 through secondary level including classrooms for art and music, a science laboratory, a kitchen and food-serving area attached to a canteen/hall with stage, a library, and a computer lab. Phase 2 of the building process will see a gymnasium attached to the school. As in the former location, the new school has a security gate with 24-hour security personnel.
