= Ara Sargsyan =

Soviet Armenian sculptor (1902–1969)

- Արա Միհրանի Սարգսյան
- Born: Ara Mihrani Sargsyan; 7 April 1902; Constantinople, Ottoman Empire (modern-day Turkey)
- Died: 13 June 1969 (aged 67); Yerevan, Armenian SSR, USSR
- Other names: Ara Migranovich Sarksyan, Ara Sargsian
- Education: Academy of Fine Arts Vienna
- Occupations: Sculptor, engraver, educator, scenographer, pedagogue

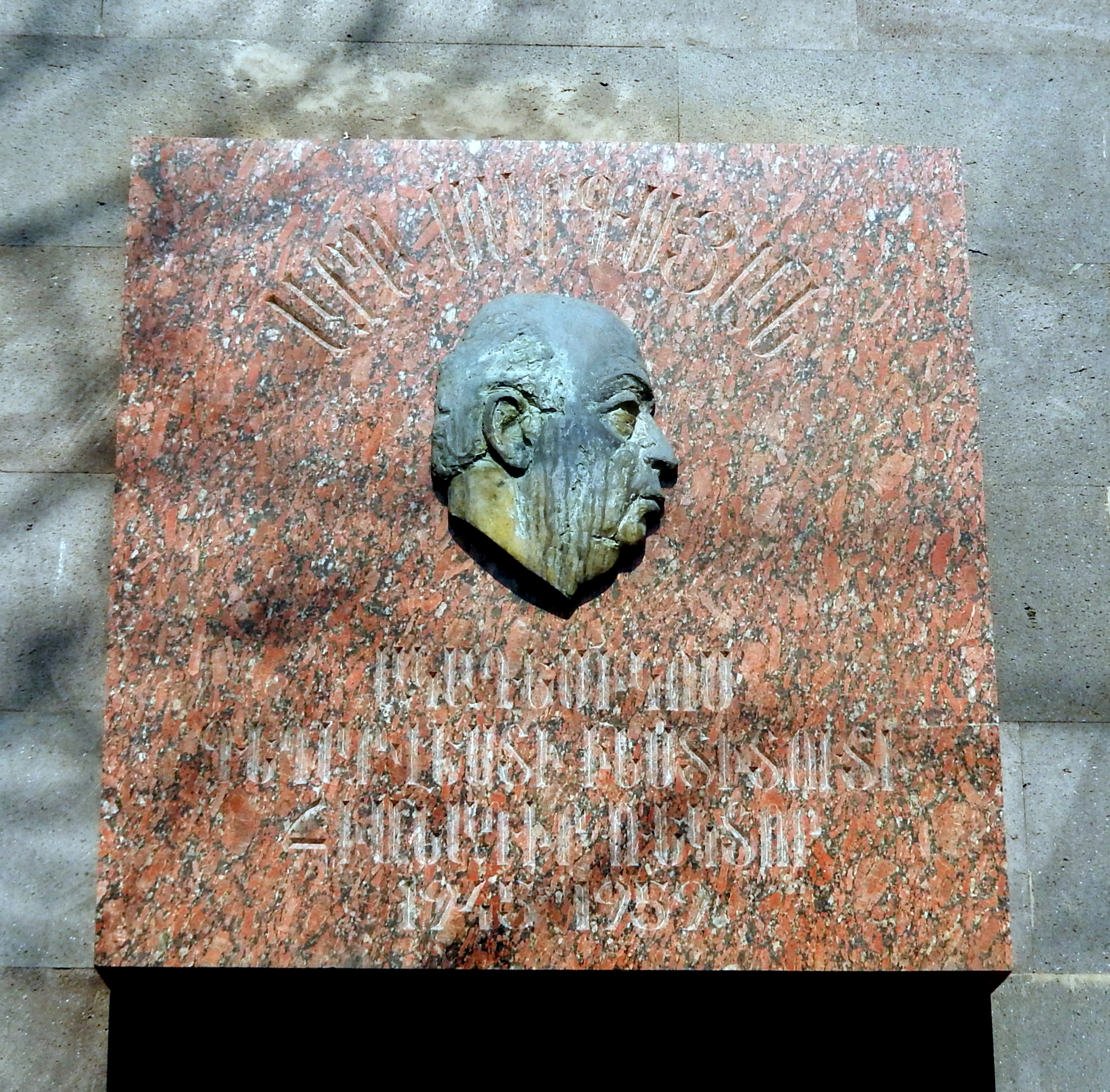
Ara Sargsyan's plaque on Isahakyan street, Yerevan

Ara Mihrani Sargsyan (Armenian: Արա Միհրանի Սարգսյան; Russian: Ара Мигранович Сарксян; 7 April 1902 – 13 June 1969) was a Soviet Armenian sculptor, engraver, educator, scenographer, and pedagogue.

== Early life and education ==
Ara Mihrani Sargsyan was born on 7 April 1902, in Constantinople, Ottoman Empire (modern-day Turkey). He finished the local Armenian school, then Constantinople Art School and studied under the Ottoman Armenian sculptor Yervant Voskan.

He moved to Athens in 1920 and further to Rome and Vienna where he studied sculpture till 1925. Sargsyan graduated in 1924 from the Academy of Fine Arts Vienna.

== Career ==
In 1925, Sargsyan moved to Yerevan, Soviet Armenia. He was one of the organizers of the Armenian branch of the AKhRR (1926).

Most recognizable works of Ara Sargsyan are the monuments of Mother Armenia in Gyumri, the Monument to Hovhannes Tumanyan (with architect Grigor Aghababyan), and Alexander Spendiaryan statue in front of Yerevan Opera Theatre, and the statues of Mesrop Mashtots and Sahak Partev in front of Yerevan State University.

Sargsyan taught at the Yerevan State Institute of Fine Arts and Theater starting in 1945; and a professor starting in 1947. He was a prolific teacher and influenced numerous artists, including Rafik Khachatryan (1937–1993).

He died on 13 June 1969, in Yerevan. Sargsyan's former house in Yerevan has been converted into a museum, where most of his works are presented.

== Awards and honors ==
- Honored Art Worker of the Armenian SSR (1935)
- Two Orders of the Badge of Honour (1939, 1945)
- People's Painter of the Armenian SSR (1950)
- Order of the Red Banner of Labour (1956)
- People's Painter of the USSR (1963)
- State Prize of the Armenian SSR (1971, posthumously)
- Medal "For the Defence of the Caucasus"
- Medal "For Valiant Labour in the Great Patriotic War 1941–1945"
