= List of statues in Yerevan =

List of the statues and memorials in Yerevan, the capital of Armenia.

== Standing statues ==
Year	Image	Person	Location	Sculptor	Architect
1931		Stepan Shahumyan	Stepan Shahumyan square, Kentron district	Sergey Merkurov	Ivan Zholtovsky
1933		Khachatur Abovian	House-Museum of Khachatur Abovian, Kanaker	Andreas Ter-Marukyan	
1949		Alexander Pushkin	Alexander Pushkin School no. 8, Kentron district	Grigor Aharonyan	
1950		Khachatur Abovian	Khachatur Abovyan Square, Kentron district	Suren Stepnanyan	Gevorg Tamanyan
1950		Nelson Stepanyan	Children's Park, Kentron district	Ara Sargsyan	Grigor Aghababayan
1955		Ghazaros Aghayan	Ghazaros Aghayan school no. 63, Kyevian street, Arabkir district	Yerem Vardanyan	
1955		Komitas Vardapet	Komitas Pantheon, Shengavit district	Ara Harutyunyan	Grigor Aghababayan
1956		Nar-Dos	Nar-Dos School no. 14, Yervand Kochar street, Kentron district	S. Manasyan	
1956		Hunan Avetisyan	Hunan Avetisyan School no. 74, Bagratunyats street, Shengavit district	Theresa Mirzoyan	Eduard Sarapyan
1956		Anton Chekhov	Anton Chekhov School no. 55, Baghramyan Avenue, Kentron district	Grigor Aharonyan	Eduard Sarapyan
1957		Simon Zakiyan	Children's Park, Kentron district	Ara Harutyunyan	S. Nersisiyan
1957		Stepan Shahumyan	Stepan Shahumyan school no. 1, Mashtots Avenue Kentron district	Sargis Baghdasaryan	Jim Torosyan
1957		Hovhannes Tumanyan	Theatrical Square (now Freedom Square), Kentron district	Ara Sargsyan	Grigor Aghababayan
1957		Alexander Spendiaryan	TTheatrical Square (now Freedom Square), Kentron district	Ghukas Chubaryan, Ara Sargsyan	Feniks Darbinyan, Grigor Aghababayan
1958		Alexander Shirvanzade	Shirvanzade School no. 21, Komitas Avenue, Arabkir district	Ara Harutyunyan	Feniks Darbinyan
1959		Sasuntsi Davit	Sasuntsi Davit square, Yerevan Railway Station, Erebuni district	Yervand Kochar	Mikael Mazmanyan
1961		Aghasi Khanjian	Komitas Pantheon, Shengavit district	Nikoghayos Nikoghosyan	Grigor Aghababayan
1963		Sayat-Nova	near the Sayat-Nova musical academy, Kentron district	Ara Harutyunyan	Eduard Sarapyan
1963		Anania Shirakatsi	Matenadaran institute, Kentron district	Grigor Badalyan	
1964		Vahan Terian	Vahan Terian School no. 60, Tigran Mets Avenue, Erebuni district	Arsham Shahinyan	B. Harutyunyan
1965		Movses of Khoren	Matenadaran institute, Kentron district	Yerem Vardanyan	
1965		Mikael Nalbandian	Circular Park, Nalbandian street, Kentron district	Nikaghayos Nikoghosyan	Jim Torosyan
1965		Avetik Isahakyan	Abovyan Street, Kentron district	Sargis Baghdasaryan	Liparit Madoyan
1965		Hagop Baronian	Liberty Avenue, Kanaker-Zeytun District	Sargis Baghdasaryan	
1967		Mesrop Mashtots	Matenadaran institute, Kentron district	Ghukas Chubaryan	
1967		Mkhitar Gosh	Matenadaran institute, Kentron district	Ghukas Chubaryan	
1967		Frik	Matenadaran institute, Kentron district	Suren Nazaryan	
1967		Toros Roslin	Matenadaran institute, Kentron district	Arsham Shahinyan	
1967		Grigor Tatevatsi	Matenadaran institute, Kentron district	Adibek Grigoryan	
1967		Vahagn, the Monster-Killer	Admiral Isakov Avenue, Malatia-Sebastia district	Karlen Nurinjanyan	
1970		Stepan Shahumyan	Sebastia street, Malatia-Sebastia district	Friedrich Soghoyan	
1970		Hrachya Acharyan	Hrachya Acharyan School no. 72, Koryun street, Kentron district	Rafayel Yekmalyan, Hovhannes Hovhannisyan	
1971		Liparit Mkhchyan	English Park, Kentron district	Hovhannes Hovhannisyan	
1972		Daniel Varujan	Daniel Varujan School no. 89, Sebastia street, Malatia-Sebastia district	Torgom Chorekchyan	
1972		Gabriel Sundukian	English Park, Kentron district	Ara Harutyunyan	
1973		Levon Orbeli	Orbeli Brothers street, Arabkir District	Gabriel Yeproyan	
1973		Armenak Mnjoyan	the Technological Center of Organic Chemistry, Azatutyan Avenue, Arabkir district	S. Manasyan, Hovhannes Muradyan	
1974		Alexander Tamanian	Yerevan Cascade, Tamanian street, Kentron district	Artashes Hovsepyan	S. Petrosyan
1974		Aleksandr Griboyedov	next to Rossiya cinema, Tigran Mets Avenue, Kentron district	Hovhannes Bejanyan	Spartak Kndeghtsyan
1974		Nairi Zarian	Nairi Zarian School no. 130, Hakob Hakobyan street backway, Arabkir district	Nikoghayos Nikoghosyan	Jim Torosyan
1975		Hayk	1st block of Nor Nork district	Karlen Nurinjanyan	
1975		Vardan Mamikonian	Circular Park, Kentron district	Yervand Kochar	Stepan Kyurkchyan
1975		Hayk Gyulikekhvyan	Mashtots Avenue, Kentron district		
1977		Hayk Bzhishkyan	Gai Avenue, Nor Nork district	Suren Nazaryan	Sarkis Gurzadyan
1978		Paruyr Sevak	Paruyr Sevak School no.123, Avanesov street, Erebuni district	Ara Shiraz	Jim Torosyan
1980		Aleksandr Myasnikyan	Aleksandr Myasnikyan square, Kentron district	Ara Shiraz	
1982		Tork Angegh	Gai Avenue, Nor Nork district	Karlen Nurinjanyan	
1982		Leo Tolstoy	Leo Tolstoy school no. 128, Azatutyan Avenue, Arabkir district	Levon Tokmajyan	Romeo Julhakyan
1984		William Saroyan	Komitas Pantheon, Shengavit district	Ara Shiraz	Jim Torosyan
1985		Vahagn, the Monster-Killer	Vagharshyan street, Arabkir district	Armen Aghalyan, G. Grigoryan	Varazdat Harutyunyan
1985		Vahagn, the Monster-Killer	Great Patriotic War Memorial park, Malatia-Sebastia district	Suren Nazaryan	Garry Rashidyan
1985		David Anhaght	David Anhaght street, Kanaker-Zeytun district	Serzh Mehrabyan	Eduard Safaryan
1985		Yeghishe Charents	Circular Park, Kentron district	Nikoghayos Nikoghosyan	Jim Torosyan
1986		Martiros Saryan	Martiros Saryan park, Kentron district	Levon Tokmajyan	Artur Tarkhanyan
1987		Raffi	Raffi School no. 36, Komitas Avenue, Arabkir district	Khachatur Iskandaryan	
1987		Hakob Meghapart	near the Armenpress building, Saryan street, Kentron district	Khachatur Iskandaryan	
1987		Armen Tigranian	Circular Park, Kentron district	Artashes Hovsepyan	
1988		Komitas Vardapet	near the Yerevan Komitas State Conservatory, Kentron District	Ara Harutyunyan	Feniks Darbinyan
1989		Tigran Petrosian	near the Yerevan Chess House, Kentron District	Ara Shiraz	Karlen Ananyan
1989		Hovhannes Shiraz	Komitas Pantheon, Shengavit District	Ara Shiraz	Aslan Mkhitaryan
1990		Vahan Tekeyan	Vahan Tekeyan School no. 92, Armin T. Wegner street, Malatia-Sebastia District	Levon Tokmajyan	
1990		Suren Spandaryan	Garegin Nzhdeh Square, Shengavit District	Tom Gevorgyan	L. Gevorgyan, G. Harutyunyan, V. Gevorgyan
1990		Garegin Nzhdeh	Christapor street 36/1, Erebuni District	Romik Galstyan	
1991		Flower-selling old man or Kara-bala (real name Stepan Harutyunian)	Abovyan Street, Kentron district	Levon Tokmajyan	
1993		Artur Karapetyan	Artur Karapetyan park, Shengavit District	R. Balayan	
1995		Movses of Khoren	Yerevan State University, Kentron District	A. Poghosyan	
1997		General José de San Martín	Argentine Republic School no. 76, Baghramyan Avenue, Kentron District		
1998		Leonid Engibaryan	Yerevan Circus, Kentron District	Levon Tokmajyan	Aslan Mkhitaryan
1999		Anania Shirakatsi	Yerevan State University, Kentron District	Aram Gharibyan	
1999		Andranik	Vahan Zatikyan park, Malatia-Sebastia district	Rafik Sargsyan	Ashot Smbatyan
1999		Aram Khachaturian	Yerevan Opera Theater, Kentron district	Yuri Petrosyan	Romik Martirosyan
1999		Sergei Parajanov	Komitas Pantheon, Shengavit district	Ara Shiraz	Aslan Mkhitaryan
2000		King Trdat III	Malatia-Sebastia district	Rafik Sargsyan	
2000		Noah	Presidential Palace, Baghramyan Avenue, Kentron district	Levon Tokmajyan	
2000		Tigranes the Great	Presidential Palace, Baghramyan Avenue, Kentron district	Levon Tokmajyan	
2000		William Saroyan	William Saroyan School no. 138, Margaryan 1st backway, Ajapnyak district	Tigran Arzumanyan	
2000		Vahan Terian	Circular Park, Kentron district	Norayr Karganyan	Hamlet Khachatryan
2001		Andrei Sakharov	Sakharov square, Kentron district	Tigran Arzumanyan	Levon Ghalumyan
2001		Vahan Zatikyan	Vahan Zatikyan park, Malatia-Sebastia district	Rafik Sargsyan	Ashot Smbatyan
2002		Andranik	near the Saint Gregory Cathedral, Kentron district	Ara Shiraz	Aslan Mkhitaryan
2002		Argishtis I of Urartu	near the Erebuni Museum, Erebuni district	Levon Tokmajyan	Eduard Baroyan
2002		Grigor Narekatsi	Sebastia street, Malatia-Sebastia district	Serzh Mehrabyan	Ashot Smbatyan
2002		Sahak Partev and Mesrop Mashtots	Yerevan State University, Kentron district	Ara Sargsyan	Romeo Julhakyan
2003		Hovhannes (Ivan) Aivazovsky	near the Komitas Chamber Music Hall, Circular Park, Kentron district	Yuri Petrosyan	Stepan Kyurkchyan
2003		Soghomon Tehlirian	Shinararneri street, Ajapnyak district	Levon Tokmajyan	
2003		Arno Babajanian	Yerevan Opera Theater, Kentron district	Davit Bejanyan	Levon Igityan
2003		Hovhannes Bagramyan	American University of Armenia, Kentron district	Norayr Karaganyan	
2003		Daniel Varujan	Daniel Varujan street, Malatia-Sebastia district	A. Avetisyan	
2004		Tigranes the Great	Gai Avenue, Nor Nork district	Levon Tokmajyan	Razmik Ohanyan
2004		Harutyun Shmavonyan	near the press building, Arshakunyats Avenue, Kentron district	Levon Tokmajyan	
2005		Ivan Isakov	Admiral Isakov Avenue, Kentron district	Gevorg Gevorgyan, Robert Balasanyan	Levon Mkrtchyan
2004		Lord Byron	Fridtjof Nansen park, Nor Nork district	Hrazdan Tokmajyan	
2004		Franz Werfel		A. Avetisyan	
2005		Hovhannes Shiraz	Malatia-Sebastia district	Ara Shiraz	Ashot Smbatyan
2005		Minas Avetisyan	Nor Zeytun, Kanaker-Zeytun District	Gevorg Gevorgyan, Robert Balayan	
2006		Andranik	Museum of Fedayis, Shengavit district		
2006		Sevkaretsi Sako	Museum of Fedayis, Shengavit district		
2006		Tigran Petrosian	Tigran Petrosian street, Davtashen district	Norayr Karganyan	
2007		Kahlil Gibran	Beirut Street, Kentron district	Levon Tokmajyan	
2007		Andranik Margaryan	Komitas Pantheon, Shengavit district		
2007		Kevork Chavush	the intersection of Beknazaryan and Mazmanyan streets, Ajapnyak district	Levon Tokmajyan	Zhirayr Petrosyan
2007		Monte Melkonian	Victory Park, Kanaker-Zeytun district		
2008		Tsovinar, the birth of Sanasar and Baghdasar	Vahagn Davtyan park, Arabkir district	Vigen Avetis	
2008		William Saroyan	the intersection of Teryan and Moskovyan streets, Kentron district	Davit Yerevantsi	Ruben Hasratyan, Levon Igityan
2009		Aram Manukian	near the Police building, Kentron district	Levon Tokmajyan	
2009		Sayat-Nova	the intersection of Sayat-Nova Avenue and Khanjyan street, Kentron district	Toros Raskelenyan	
2009		Viktor Hambardzumyan	Yerevan State University observatory, Kentron district	Tariel Hakopyan	Hayk Asatryan
2010		Vahagn Davtyan	Vahagn Davtyan park, Arabkir district	Levon Tokmajyan	
2010		Gevorg Emin	Lovers' Park, Kentron district	Ashot Aramyan	
2011		Fridtjof Nansen	the intersection of Abovyan and Moskovyan streets, Kentron district	Garegin Davtyan	
2011		Jules Bastien-Lepage	Place de France, Kentron District	Auguste Rodin	
2011		Leonardo da Vinci	Armenian National University of Architecture and Construction, Kentron District	Dino de Ranieri	
2012		Alexander Mantashev	Abovyan Street, Kentron district	Tigran Arzumanyan	
2012		Vahram Papazyan	Vahram Papazyan street, Arabkir district	Levon Tokmajyan	
2013		Garo Kahkejian	Ernst Thälmann School no. 13, Arshakunyats Avenue, Kentron district		
2013		Gurgen Margaryan	Leningradyan street, Malatia-Sebastia district		
2013		Anton Kochinyan	Anton Kochinyan street, Kentron district	Tigran Arzumanyan	
2013		Andranik Margaryan	Andranik Margaryan High School no. 29, Kentron district	Albert Sokhikyan	
2013		Taras Shevchenko	Circular Park, Kentron district	V. Petrosyan	S. Sardaryan
2013		Fridtjof Nansen	Fridtjof Nansen Park, Nor Nork District		Albert Sokhikyan
2014		Movses Gorgisyan	Movses Gorgisyan park, Shengavit District	Hayk Tokmajyan	
2014		Avag Petrosyan	Avag Petrosyan street, Kentron District	Tigran Arzumanyan	Levon Ghalumyan
2014		Calouste Gulbenkian	Calouste Gulbenkian street, Arabkir District	Garegin Davtyan	

=== Decorative statues ===
Year	Image	Name	Location	Sculptor	Architect
1965		Hands of Friendship from Carrara to Yerevan	Circular Park, Kentron district	Ara Harutyunyan	
1965		Melody	near the Yerevan Opera Theater, Kentron district	Sargis Baghdasaryan	
1967		Mother Armenia	Victory Park, Kanaker-Zeytun district	Ara Harutyunyan	Rafael Israelyan
1970		Rebirth	Circular Park, Kentron district	Ruzan Kyurkchyan	
1970		Waiting	Circular Park, Kentron district	Stepan Taryan	
1970		The Water-Selling Boy	Stepan Shahumyan square, Kentron district	Hovhannes Bejanyan	Spartak Kndeghtsyan
1972		Hypernetic's Muse	Mergelyan Institute of Mathematical Machines, Arabkir district	Yervand Kochar	
1973		Anush and Saro	Tumanyan Park, Ajapnyak district	Levon Tokmajyan	
1975		The Girl from Van	Abovyan Street, Kentron district	Hripsimé Simonyan	
1975		Nor Arabkir	Komitas Avenue, Arabkir district	Spartak Kndeghtsyan	
1976		Pepo	English Park, Kentron district	Grigor Aharonyan	Mark Grigoryan
1982		Maternity	Pargev Margaryan maternity hospital, Mashtots Avenue, Kentron district	Yuri Minasyan	
1984		Mountain Dance	near "Dvin" hotel, Hakop Paronyan street, Kentron district	Tigran Arzumanyan	Ashot Aleksanyan
1985		Revived Armenia	Circular Park, Kentron district	Khoren Ter-Harutyunyan	
1985		The Woman from Karabakh	near the Yerevan Opera Theater, Kentron district	Davit Yerevantsi	
1986		Loretsi Sako	Tumanyan Park, Ajapnyak district	Sargis Baghdasaryan	
1986		Peace	Malatia-Sebastia district	Suren Nazaryan	
1990		Phoenix	Paronyan Musical Comedy Theatre of Yerevan, Kentron district	William Petrosyan	
1994		Angel	Children's railway, Kentron district	Hovhannes Muradyan	
1994		Fire Dance (Lilith)	Uruguay square, Kentron district	William Petrosyan	
1994		Jaguar	Children's railway, Kentron district	William Petrosyan	
2001		Prometheus	Faustus of Byzantium street, Kentron district	Yuri Petrosyan	
2002		Cat	Tamanian street, Kentron district	Fernando Botero	
2002		Roman Warrior	Tamanian street, Kentron district	Fernando Botero	
2002		Mother Arisen from Ashes	Tsitsernakaberd Genocide memorial, Kentron district	Rostam Avetisyan	
2003		Melancholia	Faustus of Byzantium street, Kentron district	Yervand Kochar	Ashot Karapetyan
2007		"The Men" (1973)	Martiros Saryan park, Kentron district	Davit Minasyan	
2009		Armenuhi	Lovers' Park, Kentron district	Hripsime Simonyan	
2012		Eternal Conduct	the intersection of Moskovyan and Terian streets, Kentron district	Davit Yerevantsi	Ruben Hasratyan
2012		Smoking Woman	Tamanian street, Kentron district	Fernando Botero	

== Removed statues ==
Year completed - year removed	Image	Name	Location	Sculptor	Architect
1896-1930's		Catherine II of Russia	near the Saint Nikolai Cathedral (now Shahumyan square), Kentron district	Alexander Opekushin	
1932–1988		Meshadi Azizbekov	Azizbekov square (now Sakharov square), Kentron district	Suren Stepanyan	
1935-1990's		Ghukas Ghukasyan	near the Yerevan State University, Kentron district	Suren Stepanyan	Hayk Asatryan
1939-1941		Sasuntsi Davit	Sasuntsi Davit Square, same artist and location as current Sasuntsi Davit statue which was demolished when sculptor Kochar was arrested by the Soviets, then he was commissioned to place a new one after he was "rehabilitated".	Yervand Kochar	
1940–1991		Vladimir Lenin	Lenin square (now Republic Square), Kentron district	Sergey Merkurov	Levon Vardanyan
1950–1962		Joseph Stalin	Victory Park, Kanaker-Zeytun district, replaced with the current statue of Mother Armenia	Sergey Merkurov	Rafael Israelyan
1962–1990		Karl Marx	near the State Engineering University of Armenia, Kentron district	Artashes Hovsepyan	Seda Petrosyan
1990's		Kamo	near the Kamo school (now the Argentine Republic school no. 76), Baghramyan Avenue, Arabkir district	L. Apresyan	E. Papyan
1982 - 1990's		Glory to the work	the intersection of Arshakunyats Avenue and Bagratunyats street, Shengavit district	Ara Harutyunyan	
