= Spandaryan, Shirak =

Spandaryan Սպանդարյան
- Location within Armenia Location within Shirak
- Coordinates: 40°39′54″N 44°01′08″E
- Country: Armenia
- Province: Shirak
- Municipality: Artik

Population (2011)
  - Total: 1,662
- Time zone: UTC+4
  - Summer (DST): UTC+5

Spandaryan (Armenian: Սպանդարյան) is a village in the Artik Municipality of the Shirak Province of Armenia. The village was renamed in 1946 in honor of Armenian revolutionary Suren Spandaryan.

== Demographics ==
Historical population
Year	Pop.	±% p.a.
1831	65	—
1873	429	+4.60%
1897	632	+1.63%
1926	816	+0.89%
1931	881	+1.54%
1939	856	−0.36%
1959	873	+0.10%
1970	1,131	+2.38%
1979	1,118	−0.13%
1989	1,446	+2.61%
2001	1,482	+0.21%
2011	1,662	+1.15%
