= Prague Conference =

6th All-Russian Conference of the Russian Social Democratic Labour Party (1912)

The Prague Conference, officially the 6th All-Russian Conference of the Russian Social Democratic Labour Party, was held in Prague, Austria-Hungary (present-day Czech Republic), on 5–17 January 1912. Sixteen Bolsheviks and two Mensheviks attended, although Joseph Stalin and Yakov Sverdlov were unable to attend because they were in internal exile at the time, while Georgi Plekhanov claimed he was too ill to attend. At the conference, Vladimir Lenin and his supporters broke away from the rest of the Russian Social Democratic Labour Party and formed their own predominantly Bolshevik Russian Social Democratic Labour Party. The conference was meant to be secret; Lenin had instructed: "No-one, no organisation must know about this". However, every detail was known to the Okhrana, the secret police of the Russian Empire.

== History ==
Seven people were elected to the Central Committee: Lenin, Grigory Zinoviev, Roman Malinovsky (later revealed to be a spy for the Okhrana), Sergo Ordzhonikidze, Suren Spandaryan (Stalin's best friend), Yakov Sverdlov (Soviet leader, 1917–19) and Filipp Goloshchyokin. The latter four set up a Russian Bureau to direct the party along with Mikhail Kalinin and Stalin, who led the Bureau. This ensured the domination of Russia-based Bolsheviks, as opposed to the émigrés who were considered "null and void" by Ordzhonikidze. Spandaryan called for the émigré group to be dissolved.

After the conference, upon Lenin and Zinoviev's recommendation, Stalin was co-opted to the Central Committee. Elena Stasova was made Secretary to the Russian Bureau. Stepan Shaumian and Kalinin (Soviet head of state 1919–46) became candidate Central Committee members. Kalinin was suspected of being an Okhrana agent so was not a full member. Both were Stalin's comrades in the Caucasus.

Lenin wrote to Maxim Gorky: "At last we have succeeded, in spite of the Liquidator scum, in restoring the Party and its Central Committee. I hope you will rejoice with us over the fact." Stalin said: "This conference was of the utmost importance in the history of our Party, for it drew a boundary line between the Bolsheviks and the Mensheviks and amalgamated the Bolshevik organizations all over the country into a united Bolshevik Party." This view would not have been accepted by Lenin at the time of the Conference, who maintained that only "Liquidators" were excluded from the "Prague" RSDLP, and that not all Mensheviks were Liquidators.
