= Suren Spandaryan =

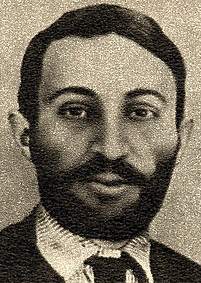
- Born: 1882; Tiflis, Tiflis Governorate, Caucasus Viceroyalty, Russian Empire
- Died: 1916 (aged 33–34); Krasnoyarsk, Russian Empire
- Occupations: literature critic, publicist and Bolshevik

Suren Spandari Spandaryan (Armenian: Սուրեն Սպանդարի Սպանդարյան; 1882 in Tiflis – 24 September 1916) was an Armenian revolutionary in the Russian Empire, literary critic, publicist and one of the founders of the Bolshevik faction of the Russian Social Democratic Labour Party.

== Life ==
Spandaryan was born in 1882 in Tiflis. His father was a newspaper editor.

Spandaryan became Joseph Stalin's "best friend" as early as 1902 when he let him print pamphlets using his father's printing presses. In 1907, they spent New Year's Eve together in Baku and attempted to encourage more strikes among the workers there.

In January 1912, he was elected to the Central Committee of the Bolsheviks at the Prague Conference. In March of the same year, Spandaryan was arrested in Baku. Lenin, who considered Spandaryan a "very valuable and prominent worker" supported Spandaryan's father financially after the arrest, since the latter at that time lived in Paris without any means.

Spandaryan had a wife, Olga, and children. He was sentenced to lifelong exile to Siberia, where he died four years later.

== Honors ==
There is a statue of him in Yerevan. The towns of Spandaryan, Shirak, Spandaryan, Syunik and Surenavan are named after him.

== See also ==
- List of statues in Yerevan
