= Vahan Terian =

Armenian poet (1885–1920)

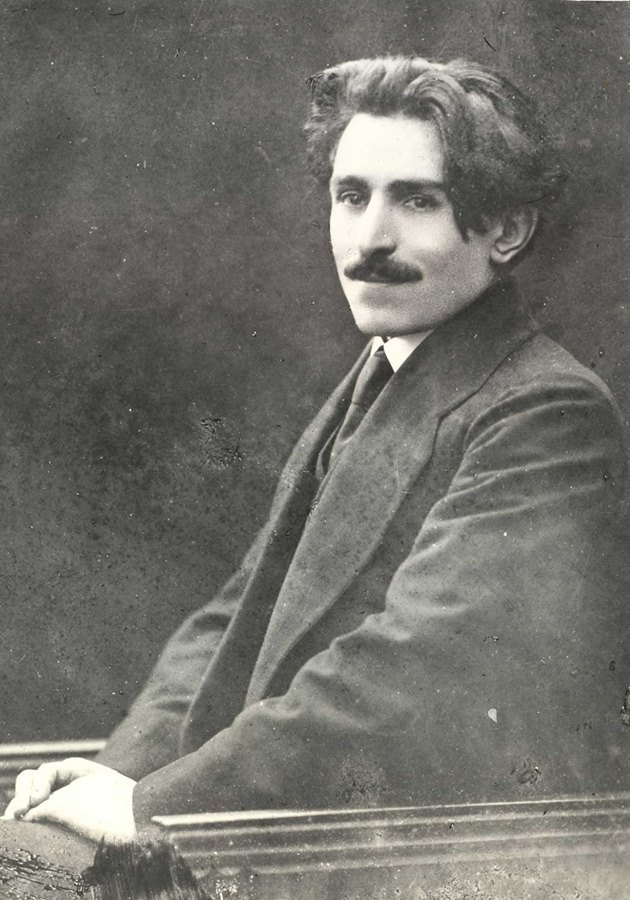
- Born: 9 February 1885; Gandzani, Akhalkalaki uezd, Tiflis Governorate, Russian Empire
- Died: 7 January 1920 (aged 34); Orenburg, Russian SFSR
- Education: University of Moscow; Lazarian College
- Occupation: Poet
- Spouse: Susanna Teryan
- Writing career
- Period: 1903–1911
- Genre: Lyric poetry

Vahan Terian (Armenian: Վահան Տերյան, real name Vahan Ter-Grigoryan; 9 February 1885 – 7 January 1920; Orenburg, Soviet Russia), was a prominent Armenian poet, lyricist, public and political figure.

Born in Gandza, Terian attended the Lazarev Seminary in Moscow, Moscow State University, and Saint-Petersburg University, where he worked in various journals that shaped his literary work. Terian’s first poetry collection, Mtnshaghi Anourjner ("Twilight Dreams") received positive feedback in literary circles. Other notable works include the collections "Night Remembrance," "The Golden Legend," "The Return," "The Golden Link," "In the Land of Nairi," and "The Cat's Paradise."

Besides poetry, Terian’s contribution to literature includes translations of European, Russian, Indian, and Georgian literary works to Russian and Armenian. Terian translated Sappho, Baudelaire, Wilde, Bryusov, Rustaveli, and many others.

In October 1917, Terian actively participated in the Bolshevik Revolution and the civil wars that followed. He participated in the signing of the Brest peace treaty with Lenin's signed mandate.

Terian died of tuberculosis in 1920 in Orenburg.

== Biography ==
=== Early life ===
Vahan Terian was born on 28 January (February 9, according to the new calendar), 1885, in the village of Gandza and was the twelfth child of Ter Sukias and Yughaber. His parents had lost four children; four of the survivors were girls (Ashkhen, Taguhi, Nakhshun, Heghineh), and four were boys (Ghazar, Aram, Nerses, Vahan). Vahan was the youngest of the boys. His family perceived him as a shy, modest, and curious boy despite the fact that he was the youngest in the family. In his early life, Terian lived in Gandza and was highly influenced by his homeland's nature, which can be observed in his letters and poems.

=== Education and Literary Activity ===
Vahan Terian received his primary education at home "with his father's direct involvement.” After that he received education in the village school, where he quickly learned how to read and write. His father sent him to school to prepare for the entrance exams to Lazarеv Seminary, as he dreamed of his son being accepted into that educational institution. Vahan Terian faced difficulties in his admission to the Lazarеv Seminary, as the institution prioritized lighter-skinned candidates over him. Despite these challenges, he was eventually admitted to the third grade in 1899.

Terian’s brother, Aram, was one of the leaders of the student club Tsiatsan (Ծիածան, "Rainbow"), which was active from 1898 to 1902 and gathered up to 500 members from Tbilisi secondary schools. The club focused on Armenian language, literature, and history, with lectures given by prominent intellectuals, including Stepan Shahumyan, Hovhannes Tumanyan, Stepan Malkhasyants, Nikol Aghbalyan, and Derenik Demirchyan. Discussions often centered around the Armenian Question and revolutionary movements. Terian attended Tsiatsan meetings and read its student magazine. It was during this time that Terian’s brother Aram first noticed Vahan Terian’s early literary experiments.

In 1907, he published his first book, Mtnshaghi Anourjner ("Twilight Dreams"), and received positive criticism towards his work. He later published "Night Remembrance," "The Golden Legend," "The Return," "The Golden Link," and "In the Land of Nairi" (where he substituted the word Nairi for each instance where the word Armenia would have suited), and "The Cat's Paradise."

After graduating from the seminary in 1906, he continued his studies at the Faculty of History and Philology of Moscow State University from years 1913 to 1917. He also studied at the Faculty of Oriental Studies of Saint-Petersburg University. Terian has worked for various newspapers, which shaped his literary works. Afterwards he returned to the village to actively engage in the community by meeting with Armenian writers, which made Terian start to consider himself a writer of love.

Terian contributed not only to poetry but to translations as well. Terian's translations from European, Russian, Indian, and Georgian literature are many and varied. Sappho, Heine, Veolena, Verhaeren, Schnitzler, Baudelaire, Wilde, Bryusov, Sologub, Ivanov, Tagore, Rustaveli, Tsereteli, he translated all of their works to Russian and to Armenian. While in Gandza, Terian began translating the first volume of Leo Tolstoy's novel "War and Peace." He also translated Oscar Wilde's "Salome" from the original French. He also translated Gabriel Sundukyan's "Pepo," the first volume of Raffi's "Sparks," and Shirvanzadeh's "The Evil Spirit" from Armenian to Russian.

=== Political Activism ===
Terian left for Saint Petersburg in 1917 and became involved in revolutionary actions there. He wrote in November of that year.

"I am being offered a position in the Ministry of National Affairs and the Ministry of Foreign Affairs. I haven't made up my mind yet. In order to collaborate with the Armenian counterpart, I might accept a position in the Ministry of National Affairs. It will be fascinating. I am unable to decline since intellectual forces are needed, and party ethics forbid me from going to work for the government of the workers and peasants at a time when evil forces are engaging in repulsive sabotage. Thus, I would like to accept one of the suggested positions in theory."

The Commissariat for Armenian Affairs was established at the end of the year under the People's Commissariat for Nationalities Affairs, with Vahan Terian serving as its Deputy and V. Avanesov as its People's Commissar.

Terian prepared a report on "Turkish Armenia," outlining the problem's history, and a draft that was reviewed and approved on 29 December. Terian spoke with Vladimir Lenin and Joseph Stalin at that time, and Stalin, before even reading the report, stated that he believed the forces should be ordered to leave Armenia right away and that "the Armenians should be given the opportunity to self-determination."

With a certificate signed by Lenin, Terian departed for Brest-Litovsk in 1918 as an advisor to the Soviet delegation, where the second round of negotiations had started. Terian spent a lot of time there gathering and presenting information about the Armenian Question. For that reason, on 25 January he departed for Moscow to bring the required materials to Brest.

=== Illness and death ===
In early 1916, Terian began showing symptoms of tuberculosis. He traveled to the Caucasus for treatment, but the February Revolution prompted him to abandon treatment and go to Saint-Petersburg. In 1919, Terian, as a member of the All-Russian Central Executive Committee, received an assignment to travel to Turkmenistan (present-day Central Asian republics), but due to the serious illness, he was forced to stay in Orenburg, where he died on 7 January 1920.

Each year there is a commemoration of his life in Gandza, where he was born.

=== Personal life ===
Vahan Terian’s first lover was Antaram Miskaryan. They met in Moscow, on tram number 17. They quickly fell in love and started exchanging letters by the time Antaram left Moscow. Antaram wrote on this occasion, "The moment we climbed the steps of the tram, Vahan saw Kolya (brother’s friend) and my long braids. I don't know if he had managed to say anything else, but I heard Vahan say: "My heart wants to cut that braid."

Their love affair continued on distance, with letter sharing, until Vahan Terian met Susanna Pakhalova. Their meeting occurred in Stavropol, and they soon got engaged. Partizouni writes that Terian was exceptionally warm toward his wife Susanna. This warmth was expressed both in the few letters that have survived and in poems dedicated to her, such as "A telegram suddenly comes to me", "When the fire of the rose clouds trembles," and “My burning sun darkens.” Soon, Susanna got infected with tuberculosis. Vahan, wishing to stay with his wife, traveled to Stavropol where he fell ill as well. In May 1916 Susanna gave birth to a child who soon died. Terian and her got separated for political and personal reasons and Terian met his last lover, Anahit Shahinjanyan.

Anahit and Terian met at the People's Commissariat for Nationalities. When she got pregnant, her parents had almost rejected her and Anahit followed Terian until his death. Terian's health condition worsened during his last trip and they stopped at Orenburg. Anahit located the paramedic aboard the military-sanitary train (which they had taken from Samara) after Terian requested a camphor injection. While giving him the injection, Terian recognized the military man and inquired, "Is it possible to inject endlessly in order to prolong life for another week?" Anahit had been told by Terian to "sit quietly by his side and not cry or run around." "After that, he slowly... quietly dies."

== Works ==
The periods of Vahan Terian's language development can be divided into four categories.

- First phase the first phase encompasses the early period of the poet’s literary activity up until 1908, the publication of Mtnshaghi Anourjner. Based on the dating provided by Terian's friend and literary critic Poghos Makintsian in early 1903-1904 there existed poems written in Terianakan style– "Farewell," "Elegy," "To the Unknown Girl," etc. In the early period, Terian’s poetic style was still influenced by the linguistic developments of the previous era.
- Second phase of Terian’s linguistic development (1909-1912) was the most important in the artistic maturity of the author’s poetry. The best testimony to this is the first volume Poems, published in 1912. The collection, in addition to the edited and expanded version of Mtnshaghi Anourjner, included poetic cycles Gisher yev Husher, Voski Hekiat and Veradardz. By meticulously editing the poems written years ago, Terian cleared his poetic language of linguistic remnants of the previous period.
- Third phase Encompassed the 1910s. In 1913, Terian entered the Saint-Petersburg period of his life and creative work. The poet’s thematic, genre-based, metric, and stylistic innovations were the result of the works of poetic cycles Katvi Drakht, Yerkir Nairi, and Voske Shghta.
- Fourth phase The post-October phase (1918-1919), notable for its linguistic explorations, was Terian’s final creative period. With verses expressing the spirit of revolution, Terian provided a unique assessment of his artistic journey through his journalistic articles.

=== Legacy and Influence ===
One of the important directions in literature was the characterization of the so-called "Terian school." In the 1910s, a current operated in Eastern Armenian lyric poetry, whose representatives were clearly influenced by the poetry of Vahan Terian․ In 1996, Karine Gasparyan defended her dissertation on the topic "Vahan Teryian’s Literary School in the Aesthetic System of Mysticism," and in 2002, her book of the same name was published. In 2015, Anahit Asatryan defended her dissertation on the topic "Vahan Terian and the Terian School." It is the first comprehensive study dedicated to the Terian school.

His poetry has been adapted into music by various artists, including Project LA (Two Ghosts, an Autumn Melody, In the Night of Peace, Home, Desire) and Harout Pambukjian. (Years Years)

Notable songs based on his poems include "Come Back Again" by Levon Katrjian, "Sorrowful Souls" by Vardevar Antosyan, and "Let's Go Away" and "Forget" by Atis Harmantyan. Other adaptations include "Peaceful Nights" by Haro Buryan, "Carousel" by Artashes Avetyan, and "Autumn Melody" by Raisa Mkrtchyan. Hasmik Papyan has contributed with multiple interpretations, such as In the Fields, My Mothers Have, and You Come to Me in the Dark Evening. The evocative Nocturne (Lullaby) was performed by Flora Khorenyan, while You Will Come was brought to life by Levon Hakhverdyan and Tatev Beglaryan. Marietta Antonyan wrote the musical adaptations of Sadness and Ghost, and I Saw a Dream and a Light, which was performed by Lida Zakaryan. Additionally, Whisper and Shrshyun by Tatevik Babloyan and Mother by Vahag Rash and Anahit Simonyan.

Terian's village, Gandza, celebrates Terian days, which coincides with Vardavar. The celebration is followed by visiting his house, the flea market, singing, and reciting his poems. On this occasion, the villagers visit the Saint Hovhannes Church in Gandza as in 1904, another prominent Armenian poet, Avetik Isahakyan, was in Akhalkalaki, visiting the Ter-Grigoryan family, and on the holiday of Vardavar, they went with him to the then chapel of St. Hovhannes.

A street in Yerevan is named after Vahan Terian located in the center of the city. On the same street in the Circular Park, a monument dedicated to Terian is installed. It was installed in 1999 and officially unveiled on 9 February 2000, to mark the poet's 115th anniversary. The monument was created by Hamlet Khachatryan, Yerevan's chief architect from 1998 to 2000, and Norayr Karganyan, an Honoured Artist of the Republic of Armenia.

The statue, made of gray basalt, stands on a platform of smooth basalt. It depicts the poet seated with his head inclined toward his left shoulder, his left hand resting on the stone, and holding a book in his right hand. The details of his attire are prominently emphasized in the sculpture. The statue is 3 meters tall.

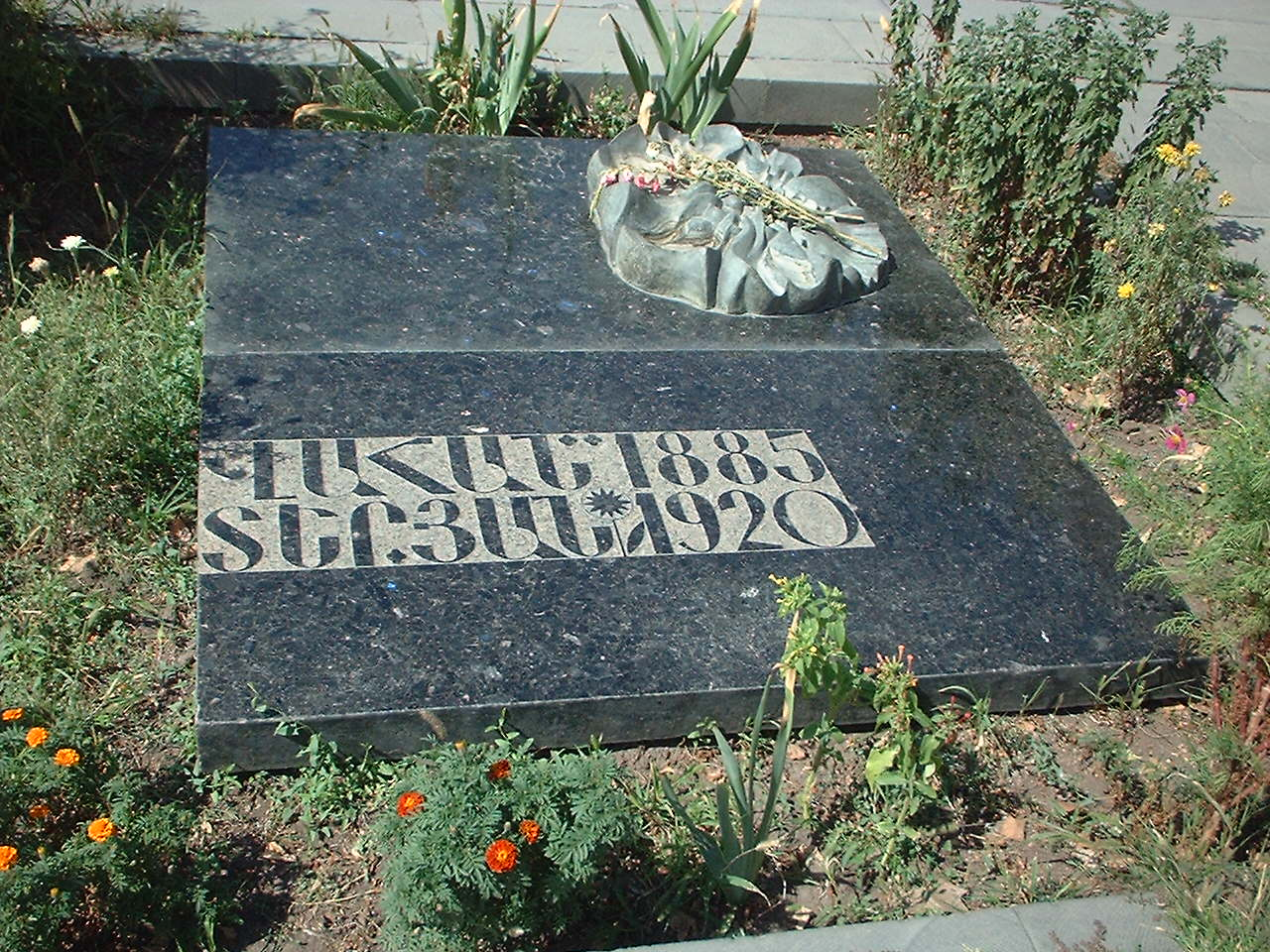
Terian's tomb in Komitas Pantheon, Yerevan
