= Komitas Chamber Music House =

Concert hall in Yerevan, Armenia

Coordinates: 40°11′7″N 44°31′23″E

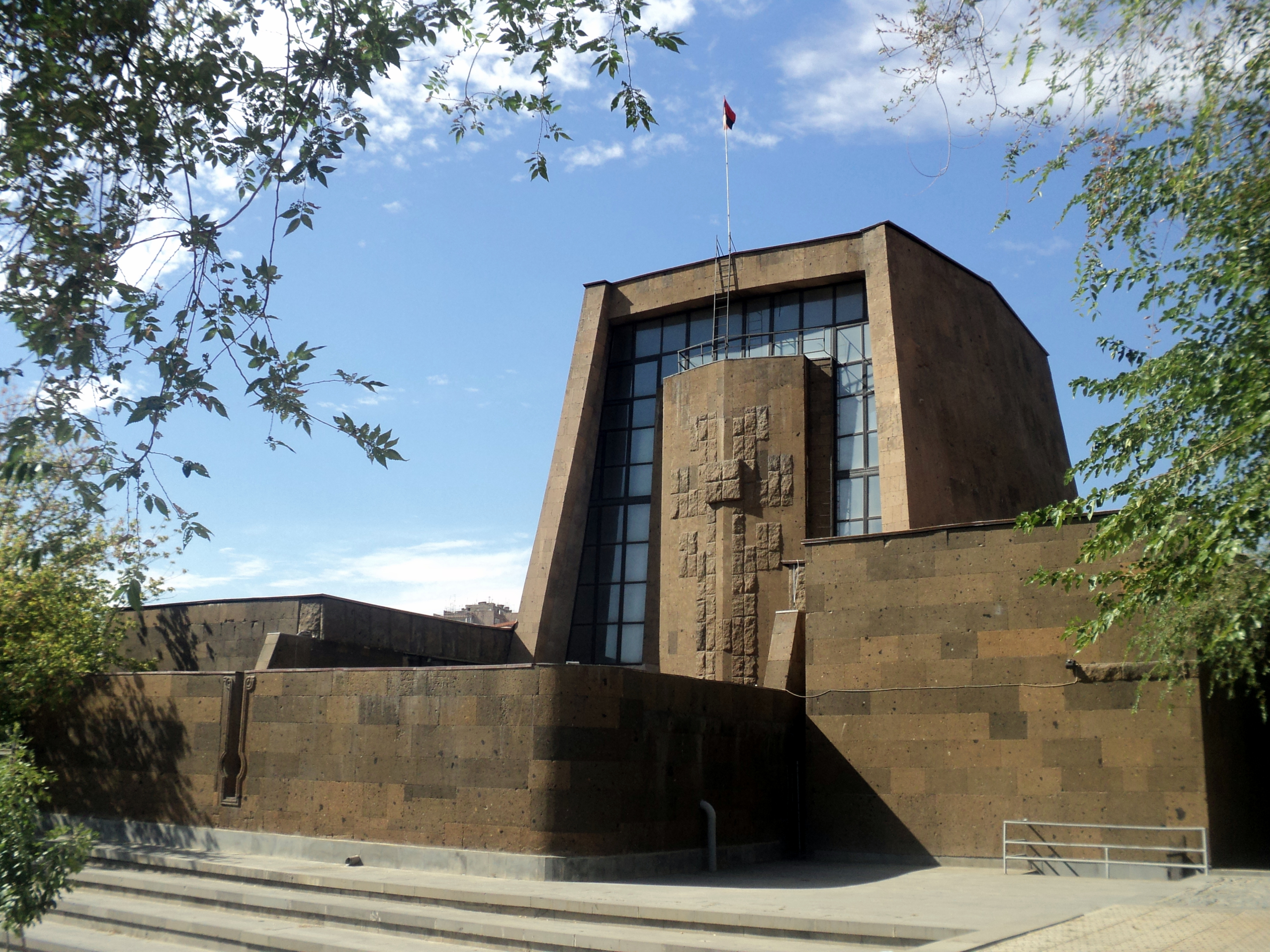
- Interactive map of Komitas Chamber Music House
- Address: Isahakyan 1 street Yerevan; Armenia
- Owner: Yerevan City Council
- Capacity: 300
- Type: Armenian architecture
- Designation: Chamber music hall
- Current use: Concerts

Construction
- Opened: 1977
- Architect: Stepan Kyurkchyan

Website
- nccm.am

Komitas Chamber Music House (Armenian: Կոմիտասի անվան կամերային երաժշտության տուն (Komitasi anvan kamerayin yerazhshtut'yan tun)) is a concert hall in Yerevan, Armenia, located on Isahakyan street at the Circular Park of Kentron district. It was designed by artist Stepan Kyurkchyan and constructed by engineer Eduard Khzmalyan.

The music hall was opened in October 1977.

It is listed among the historic and cultural monuments of the city of Yerevan.

== Architecture ==
The hall was built and designed in the shape of an Armenian three-nave basilica type church. It has a one single hall with no visible limits between the stage and the seats forming an entirely overlapping space between the musicians and the audience. The organ of the Komitas Chamber Music Hall is one of the unique pipe organs that have been used in the USSR. It was designed in the Netherlands on the basis of the 17th-century organs to perform mainly Baroque music, consisted of 4000 pipes. It was installed in 1979 and renovated in 2007.

The external walls of the hall are decorated with traditional Armenian ornaments. A large pool with water fountains forms the backyard of the music hall.

In 2003, the statue of Ivan Aivazovsky (designed by sculptor Yura Petrosyan) was erected near the chamber music house.
