= Malatia-Sebastia District =

District in Yerevan, Armenia

Malatia-Sebastia Մալաթիա-Սեբաստիա
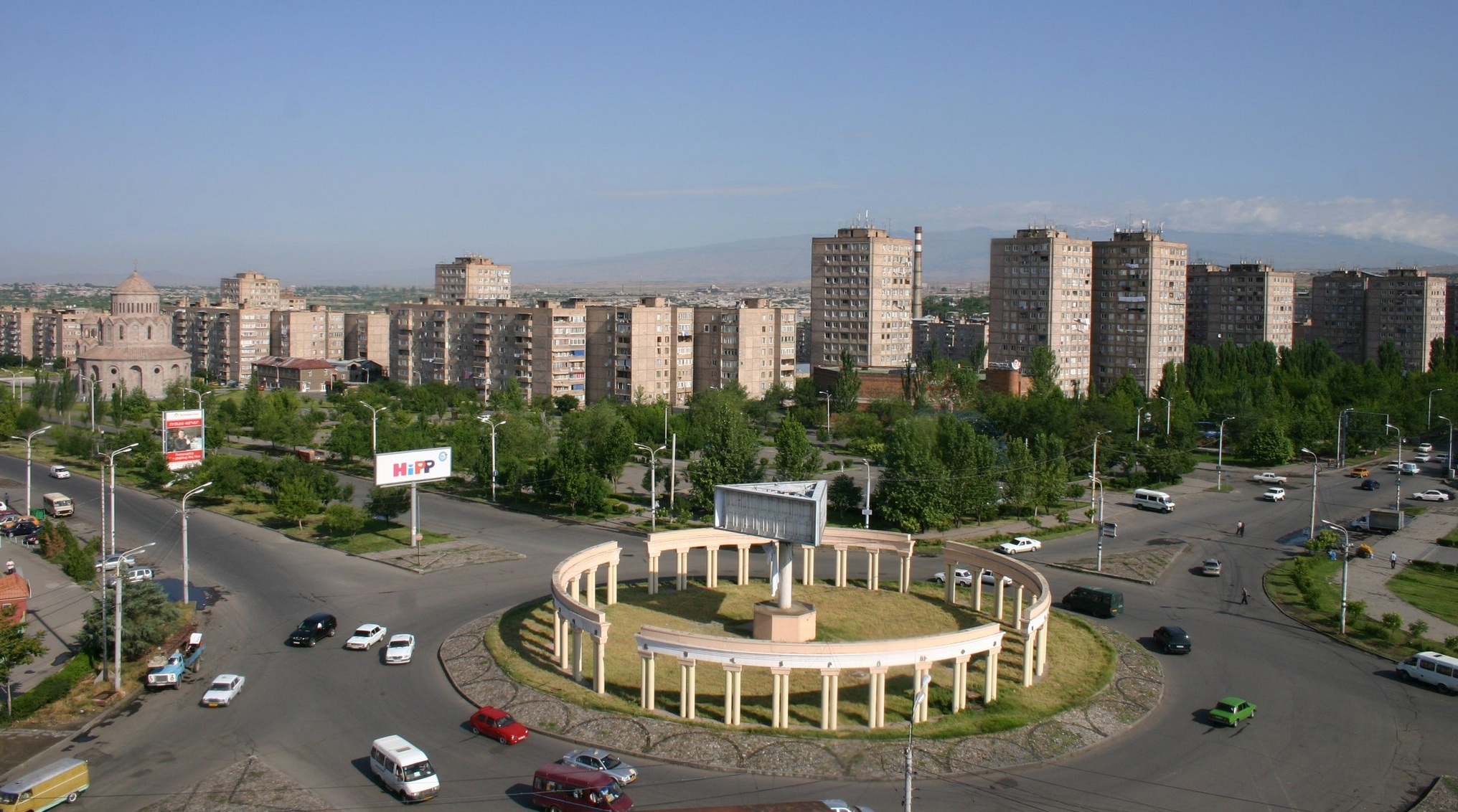
- Malatia-Sebastia administrative district

- Coordinates: 40°10′26.10″N 44°26′44.79″E
- Country: Armenia
- Marz (Province): Yerevan

Government
  - Mayor of District: Arman Barkhudaryan

Area
  - Total: 25.16 km^{2} (9.71 sq mi)
- Elevation: 950 m (3,120 ft)

Population (2022 census)
  - Total: 141,700
  - Density: 5,632/km^{2} (14,590/sq mi)
- Time zone: UTC+4 ( )

Malatia-Sebastia (Armenian: Մալաթիա-Սեբաստիա վարչական շրջան, Malat’ia-Sebastia varch’akan shrjan), one of the 12 administrative districts of Yerevan, the capital of Armenia. It is located in the western part of the city. It has common borders with the administrative districts of Ajapnyak, Kentron, and Shengavit. It also borders the Ararat and Armavir provinces.

Malatia-Sebastia has a population of 141,700 people (2022) and an area of 25.16 km².

== History ==
=== Malatia ===
Malatia itself (historical Melitine) is located in the southwestern part of the Kharberd province (vilayet) of historical Armenia.

Before the Armenian Genocide and the mass deportation of Armenians, the city's Armenian population was around 20,000 people. Even in the pre-Genocide period, as a result of socio-political pressures, a significant number of Armenians were forced to emigrate to foreign countries, particularly the United States of America.

In 1925, the survivors of historical Malatia founded a new settlement in the Shahumyan district of Yerevan, which was called Malatia.

=== Sebastia ===
Sebastia (now Sivaz) itself is located in the territory of historical Lesser Armenia and was the center of the province of the same name. The city is spread over a vast plain, through which the Alis River flows.

In 1927, the settlement of Sebastia was founded about 10 kilometers from Yerevan. Later, due to the territorial expansion of Yerevan and the construction of a bridge over the Hrazdan, the settlement joined the city and was included in the former Shahumyan region.

=== Administrative development and unification ===
==== Within Shahumyan region ====
During the Soviet era, the Malatia and Sebastia settlements were included in the Shahumyan district of Yerevan. From the 1940s to the 1960s, neighborhoods began to expand rapidly due to new settlers and the establishment of industrial enterprises. Bridges built over the Hrazdan River finally connected these suburbs with the city center.

==== Post-Soviet period ====
After Armenia's independence, as a result of the administrative-territorial reforms implemented in 1996, the Malatia-Sebastia administrative district was formed on the basis of the former Shahumyan district. It united the historical Malatia and Sebastia districts with adjacent newly built units, including the Noy and Haghtanak (formerly 4th Village) districts, as well as the residential areas adjacent to Andranik, Sheram, and Svachyan streets, which were popularly known as "Bangladesh".

== Transportation ==
There are dozens of streets and highways in the administrative district, along which about 35 bus and three trolleybus routes (№ 7, 10, 15) pass. The "Cilicia" central bus station is located in the region, which is the main transport hub of the republic, providing intercity and international connections. The district also borders the Zvartnots International Airport, with which communication is carried out via the main artery of the district, Admiral Isakov Avenue.

== Economy ==
Malatia-Sebastia administrative district is one of the key economic hubs of Yerevan. The basis of the industrial potential of the region is formed by enterprises in the food production and machine-building sectors, among which the "Yerevan Beer" (Cilicia) and "Shahumyan-Gini" factories stand out, as well as the "Astra" precision machine-building enterprise. A significant part of the trade turnover is carried out through the “Malatia” fair and the “Dalma Garden Mall” shopping and entertainment center.

== Education ==
Malatia-Sebastia administrative district has a developed educational infrastructure, which includes about 20 general education schools and 24 kindergartens. A special place in the educational system of the district is occupied by the "Mkhitar Sebastatsi" educational complex, which implements state alternative author's programs. In the field of professional and extracurricular education, the Yerevan State Humanitarian College, music and art schools and sports centers operate, and in the scientific field, the Institute of Hydroponics Problems named after G. Davtyan of the RA NAS carries out its activities.

== Healthcare ==
Malatia-Sebastia is one of the most important medical hubs in Yerevan. In the territory of the administrative district, there are such institutions of republican significance as the "Astghik" Medical Center, the S. V. Malayan Ophthalmological Center, and the Scientific Center for Traumatology and Orthopedics.

== Attractions ==
The historical and cultural heritage of the Malatia-Sebastia administrative district includes memorial complexes of state significance, religious structures and monumental art pieces that reflect different periods of Armenian history. The Yerablur military pantheon-memorial complex of national significance is located in the district, which is the main sanctuary of the memory of the heroes of the national liberation struggle. Among the spiritual centers, the Surb Astvatsatsin and Surb Irtyutyun churches are notable, in the adjacent territories of which the Zoravar Andranik Memorial Complex-Museum and the memorial group dedicated to the Fidayan movement are located. The architectural appearance of the area is complemented by the "Old and New Malatia" and "Sebastia" memorial fountains-monuments symbolizing the historical revival, as well as the statues of King Trdat III, Hovhannes Shiraz, Daniel Varuzhan, Sheram, Grigor Zohrap, and the monumental sculpture "Vahagn Vishapakagh", which is of key importance on Isakov Avenue.

== Gallery ==
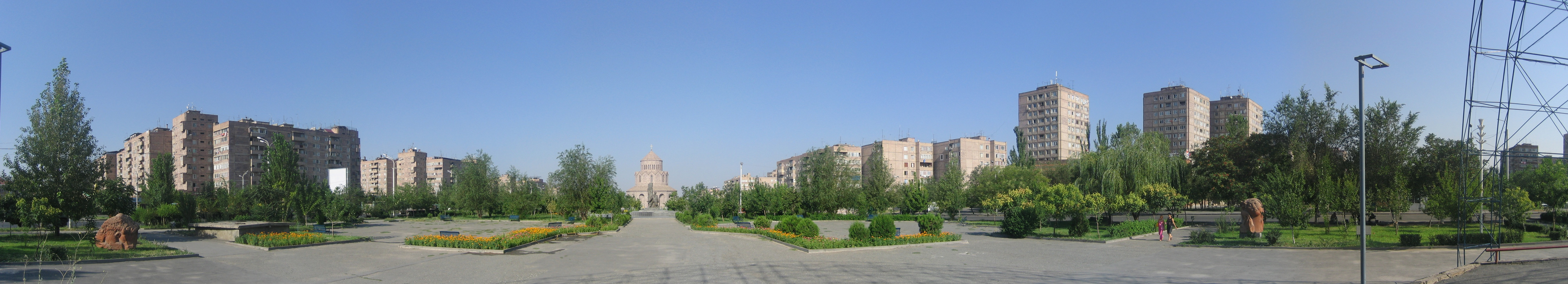
Panoramic view of Malatia-Sebastia district

Malatia-Sebastia district

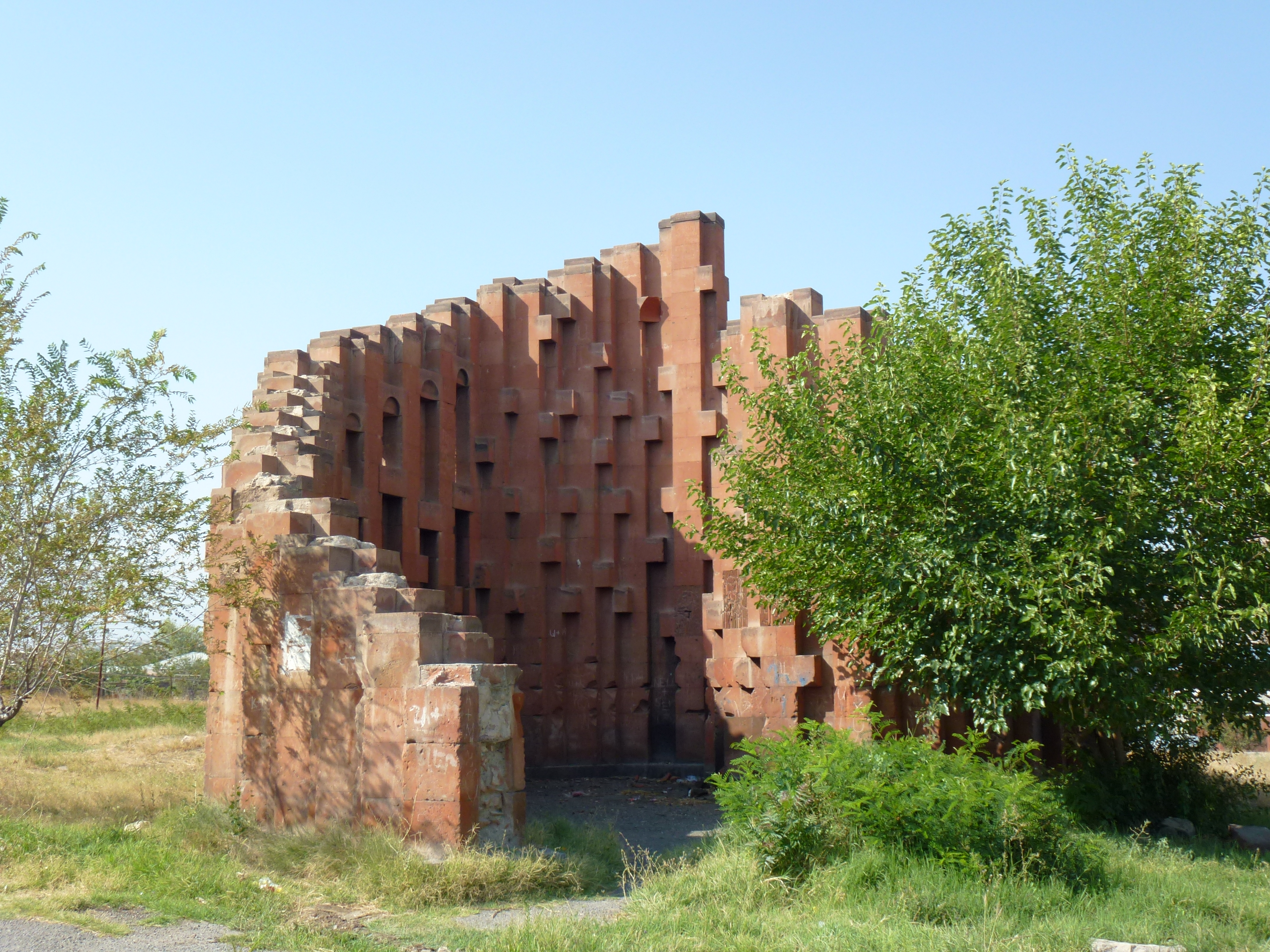
Nagorno-Karabakh conflict memorial

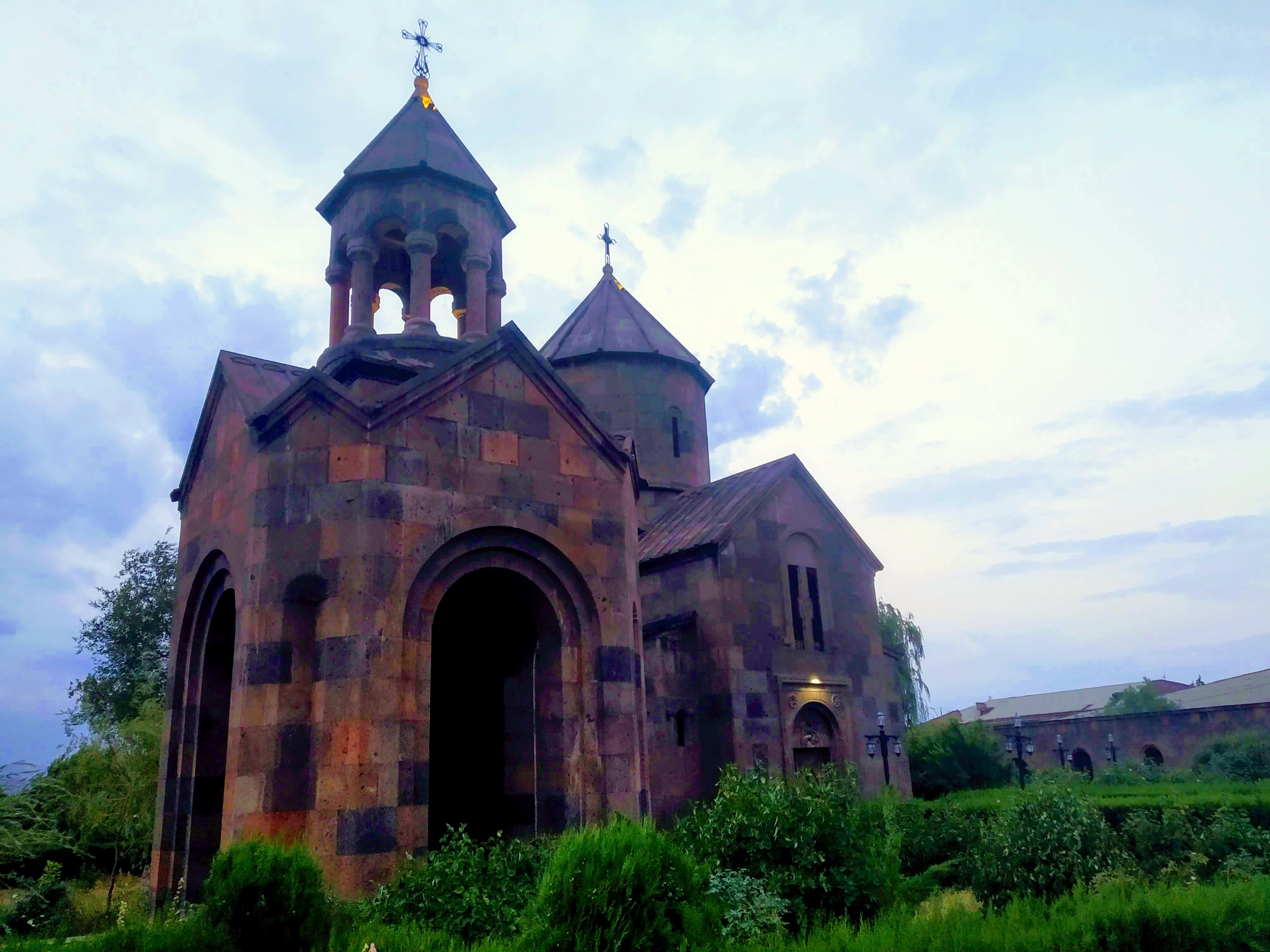
Church of the Holy Mother of God, Malatia-Sebastia District

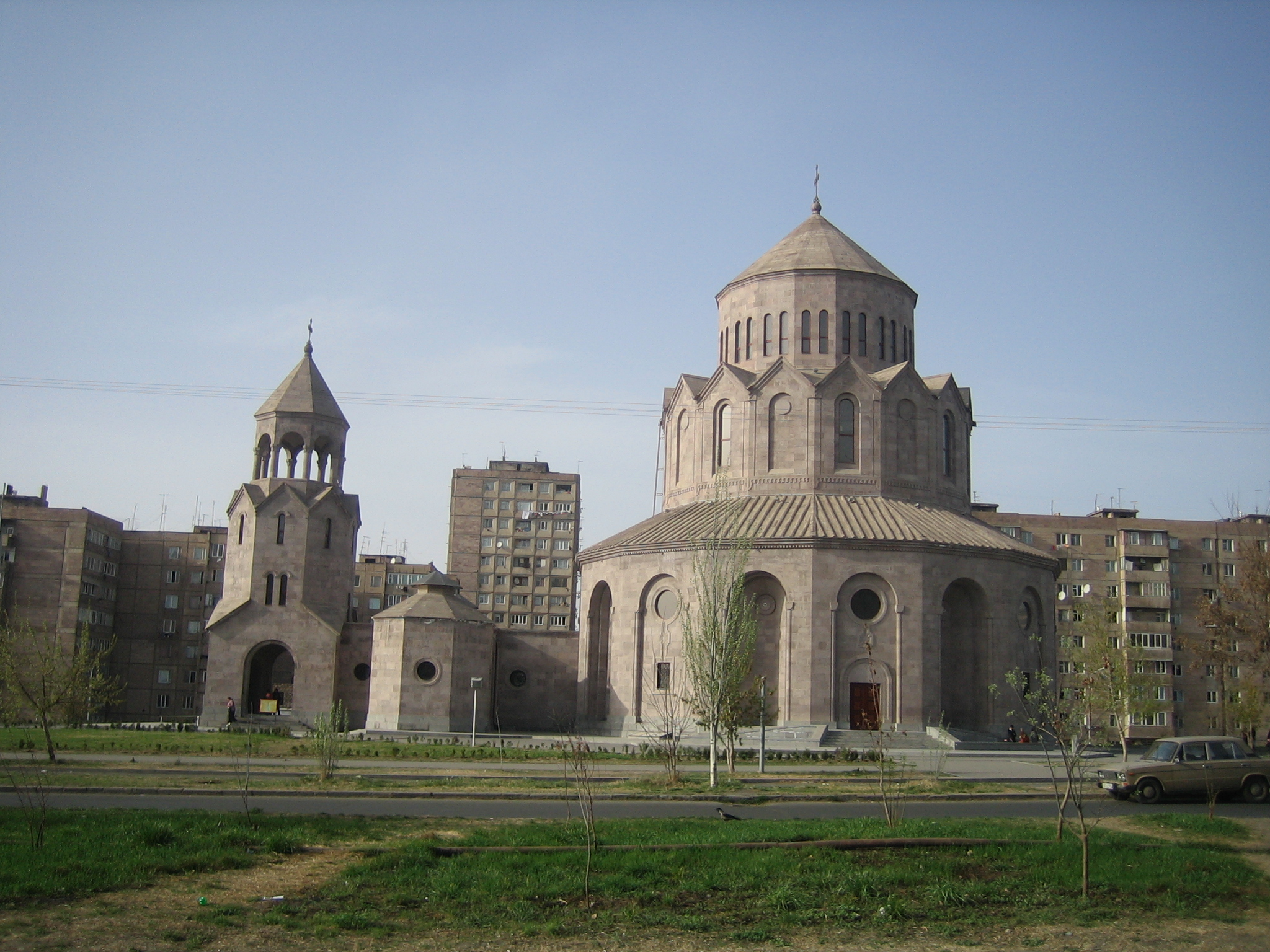
The Holy Trinity Church, Malatia-Sebastia District

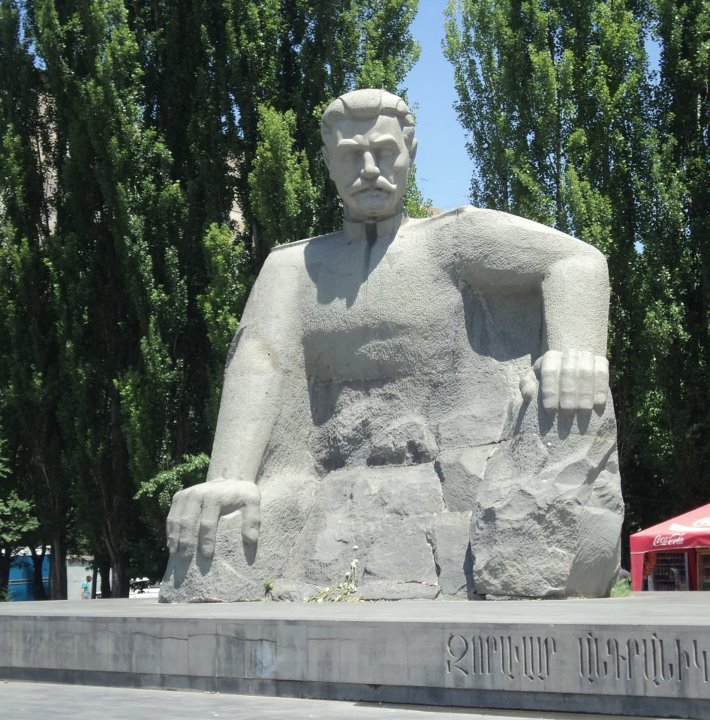
The statue of General Andranik

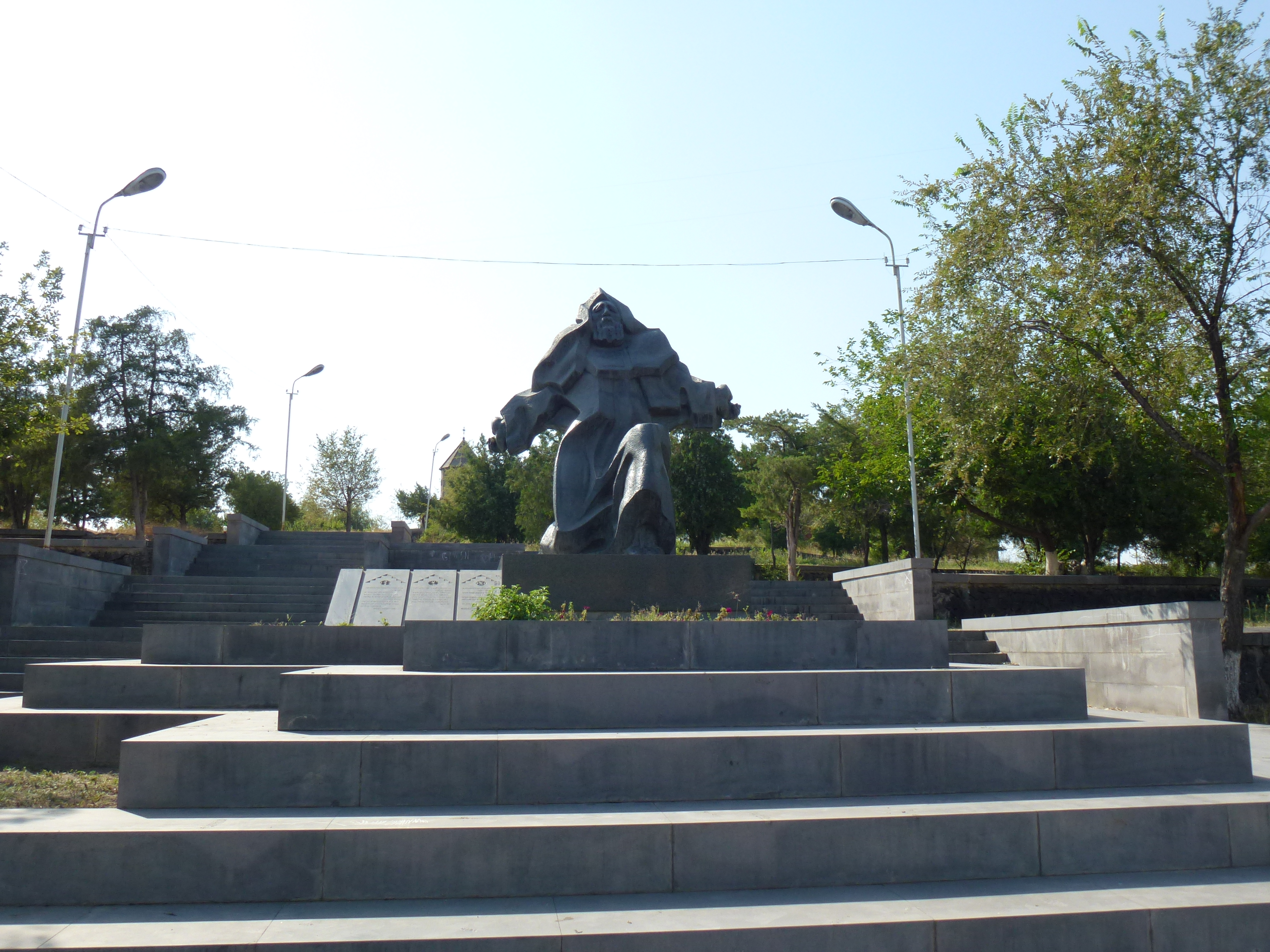
The statue of Gregory of Narek
