= Circular Park =

Park in Yerevan, Armenia

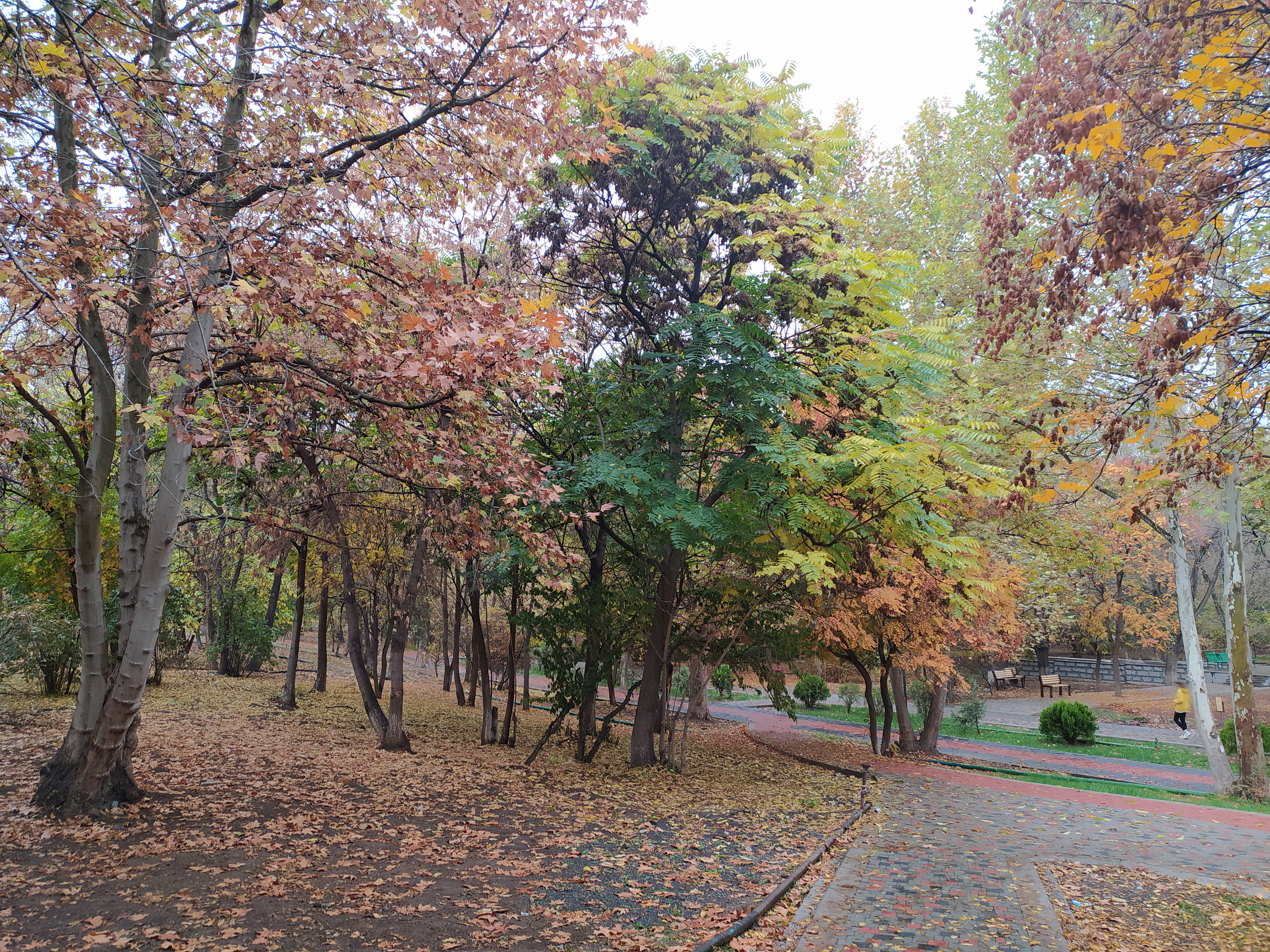
- Interactive map of Circular Park
- Type: Public
- Location: Kentron district, Yerevan, Armenia
- Coordinates: 40°10′36″N 44°31′23″E
- Area: 30 hectares (74 acres)
- Operator: Yerevan City Council
- Status: Open all year

The Circular Park (Armenian: Օղակաձև զբոսայգի); also known as the Youth Park, is a public park in the Kentron district of the Armenian capital Yerevan. It starts with the Cathedral of Saint Gregory at the south on Tigran Mets street, and ends up with the Poplavok lake at the north near Mashtots Avenue. The park lies along Khanjyan, Yervand Kochar, Alex Manoogian, Moskovian and Isahakyan streets, forming a half-circular shaped park around the eastern part of downtown Yerevan. The park has an approximate length of 2500 metres and an average width of 120 metres.

== Famous structures in the Circular Park ==
- The Circular park is home to many works of art including the statues of Aleksandr Griboyedov, Andranik Ozanian, Vardan Mamikonian, Armen Tigranian, Yeghishe Charents, Tigran Petrosian, Mikael Nalbandian, Fridtjof Nansen, Avetik Isahakyan and Vahan Terian.
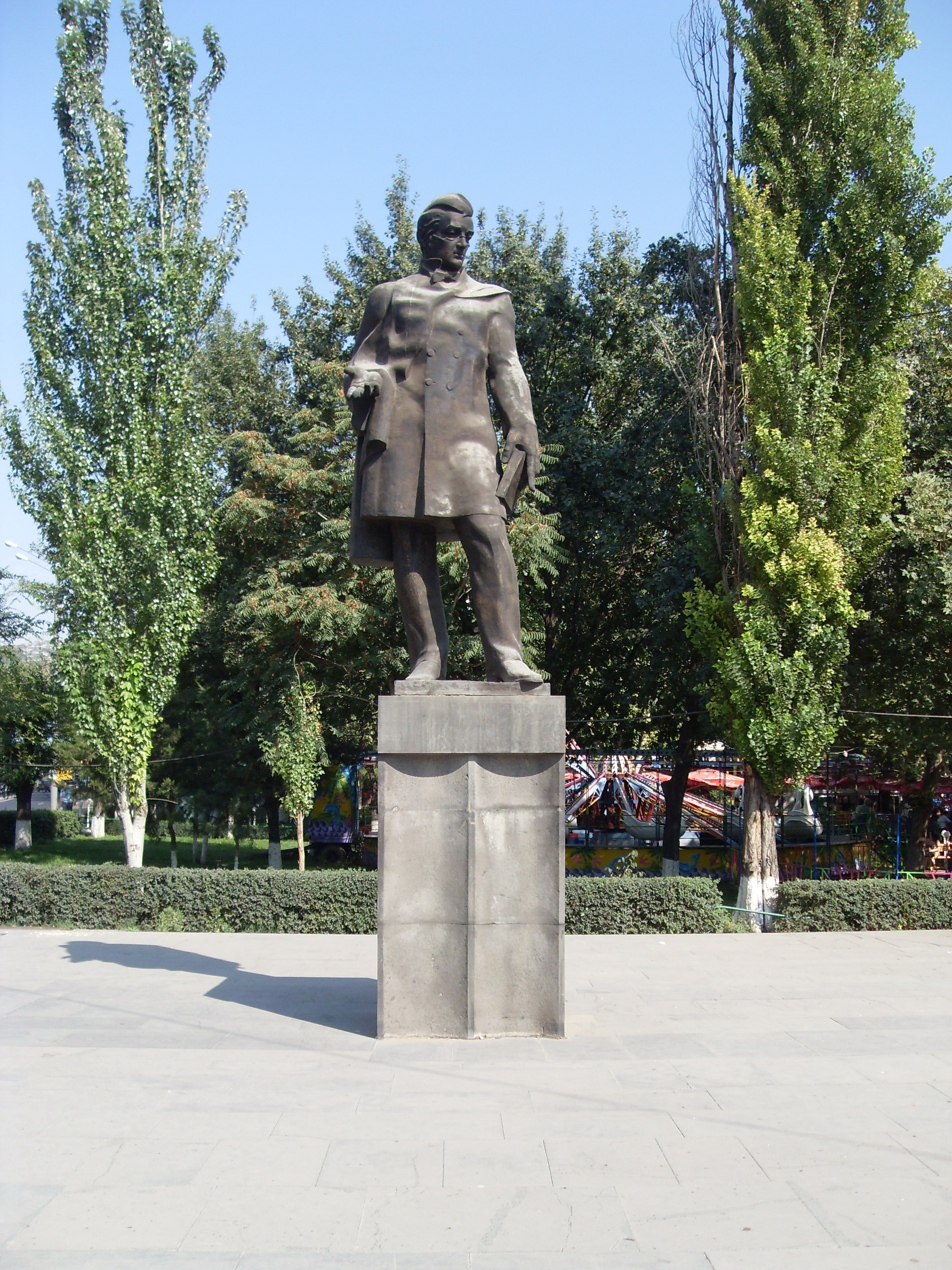
Aleksandr Griboyedov statue

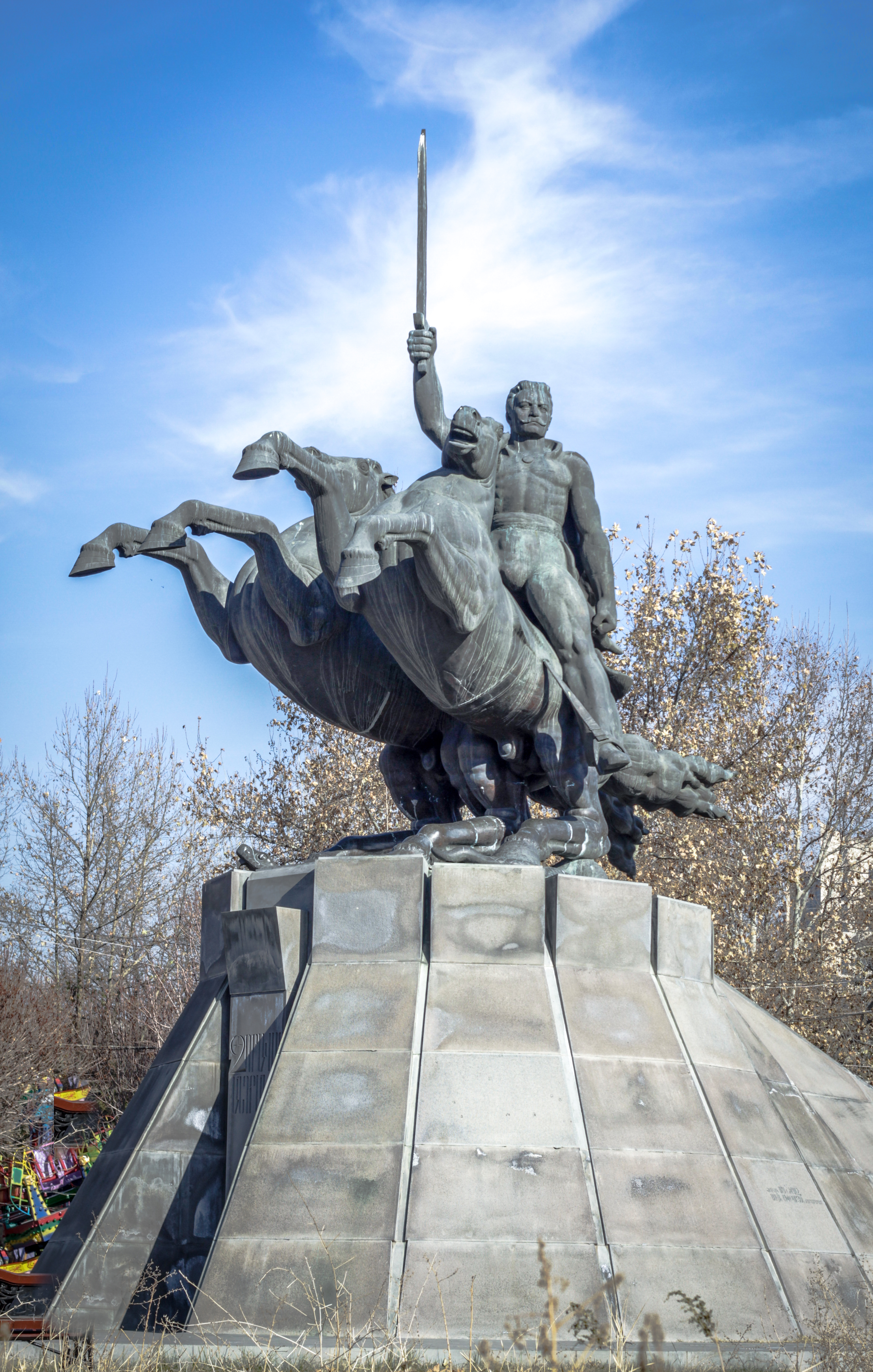
Andranik Ozanian statue

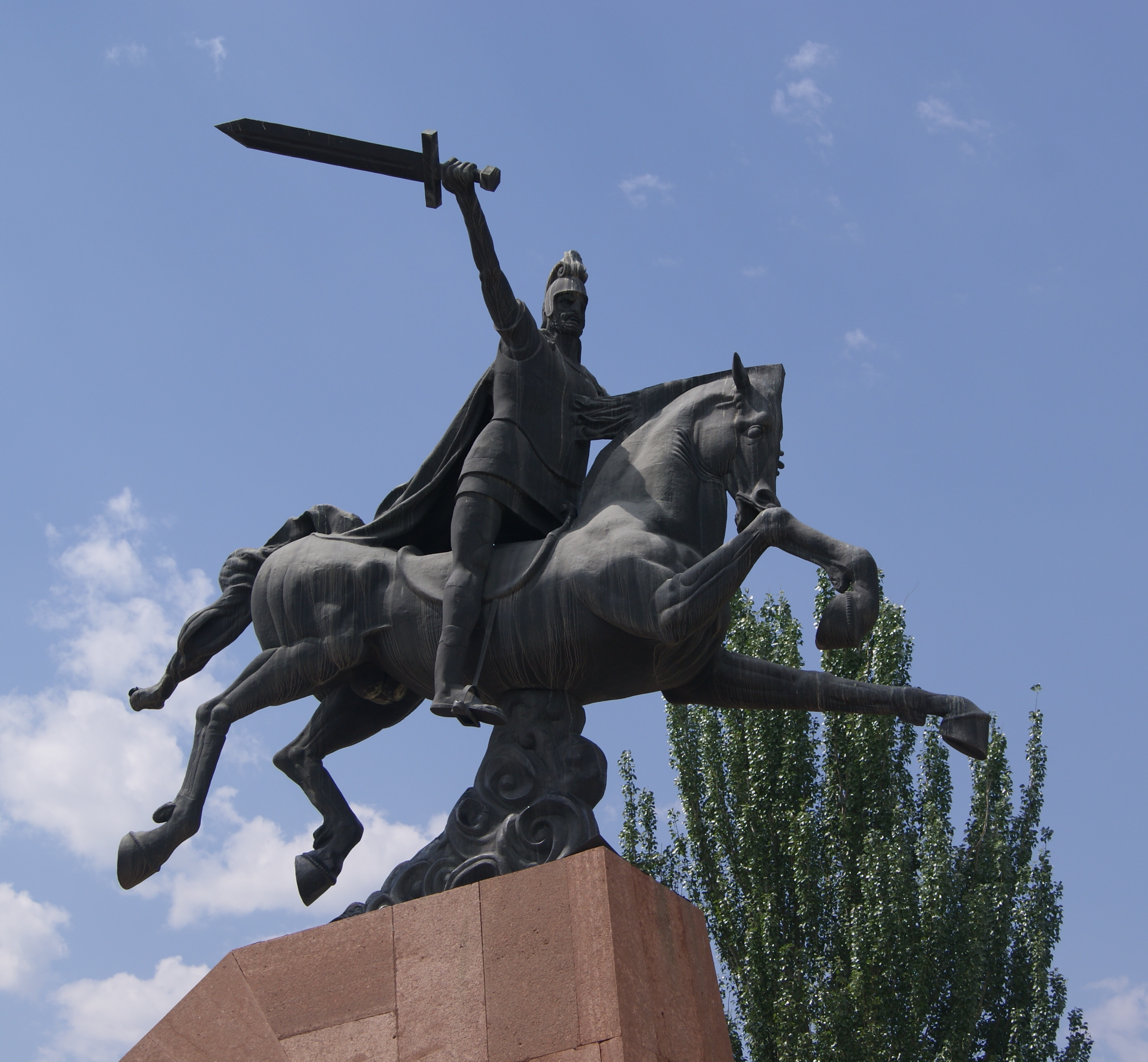
Vardan Mamikonian statue

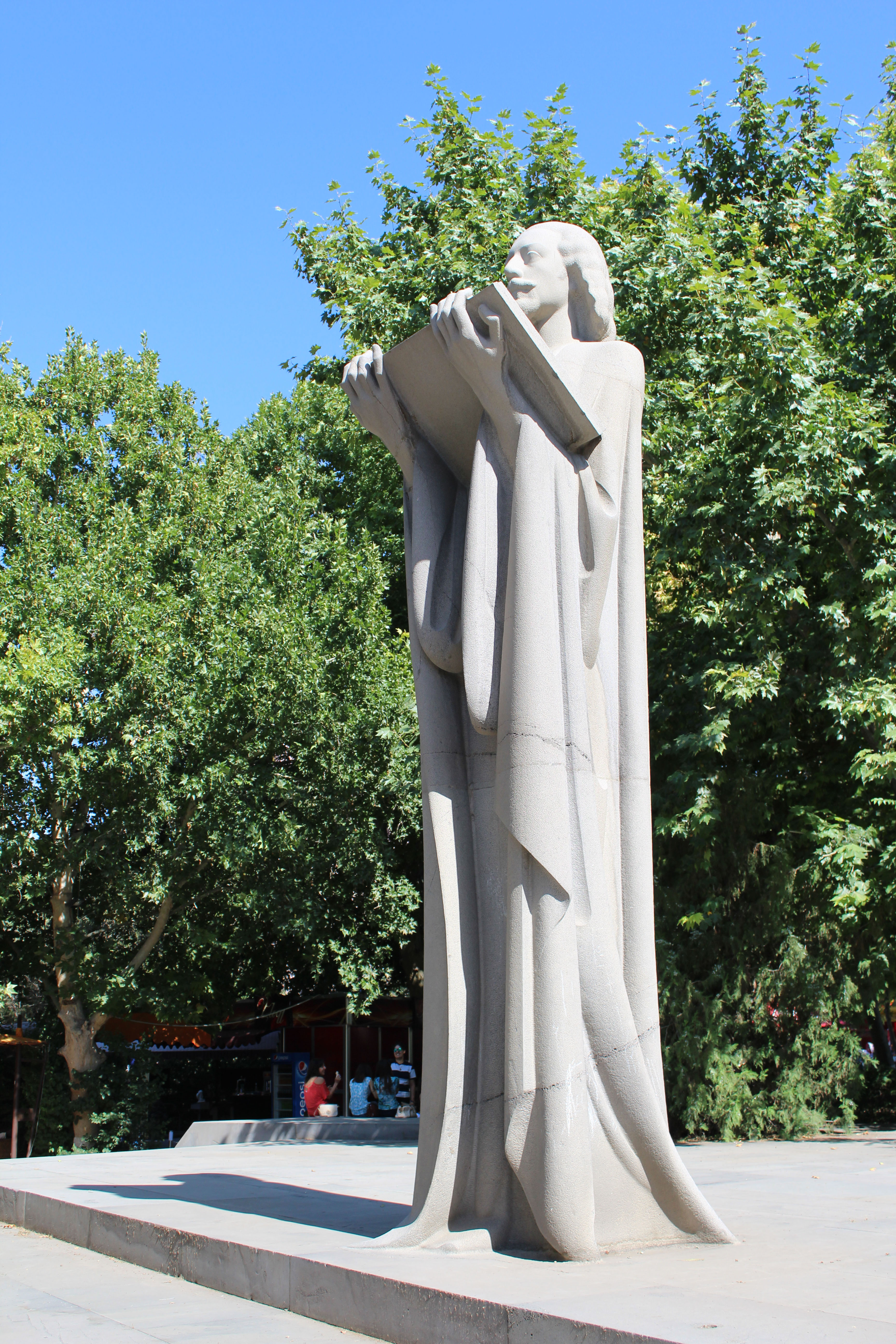
Armen Tigranian statue

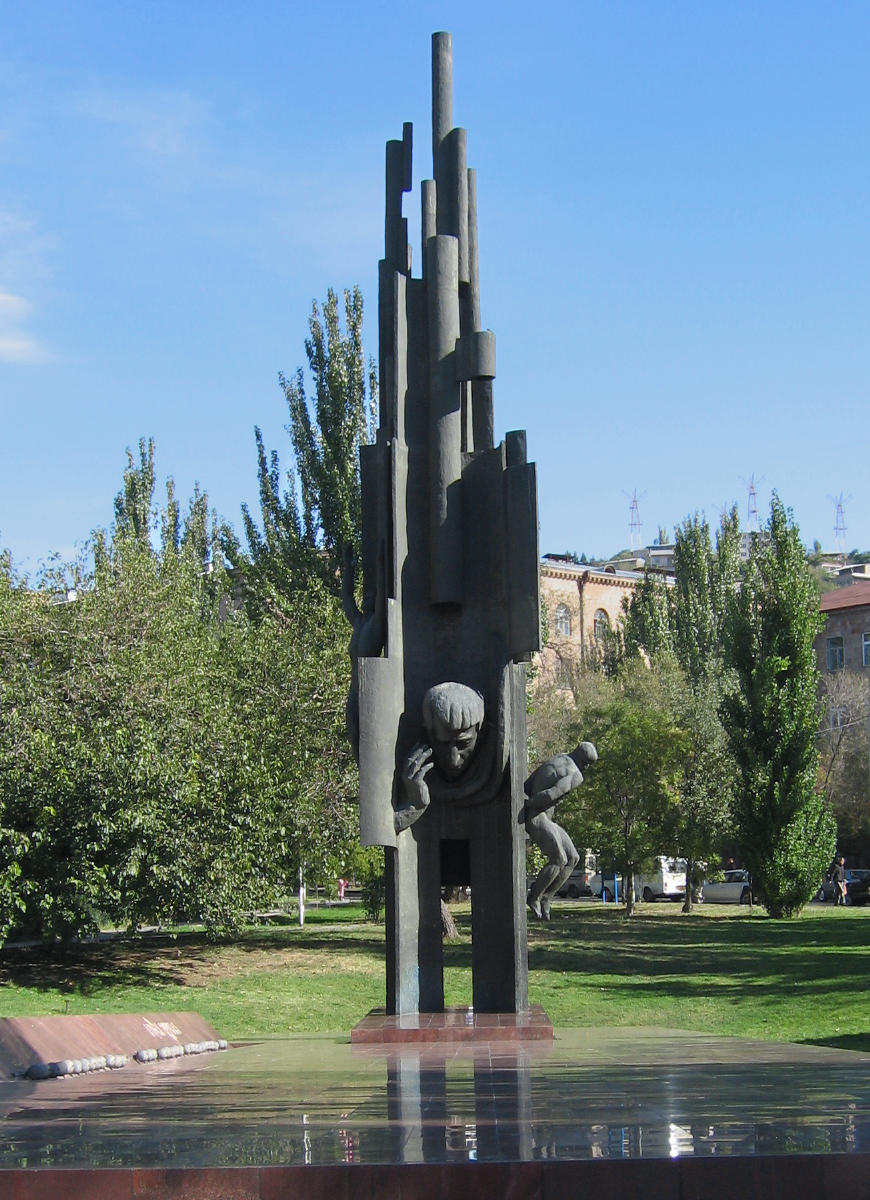
Yeghishe Charents statue

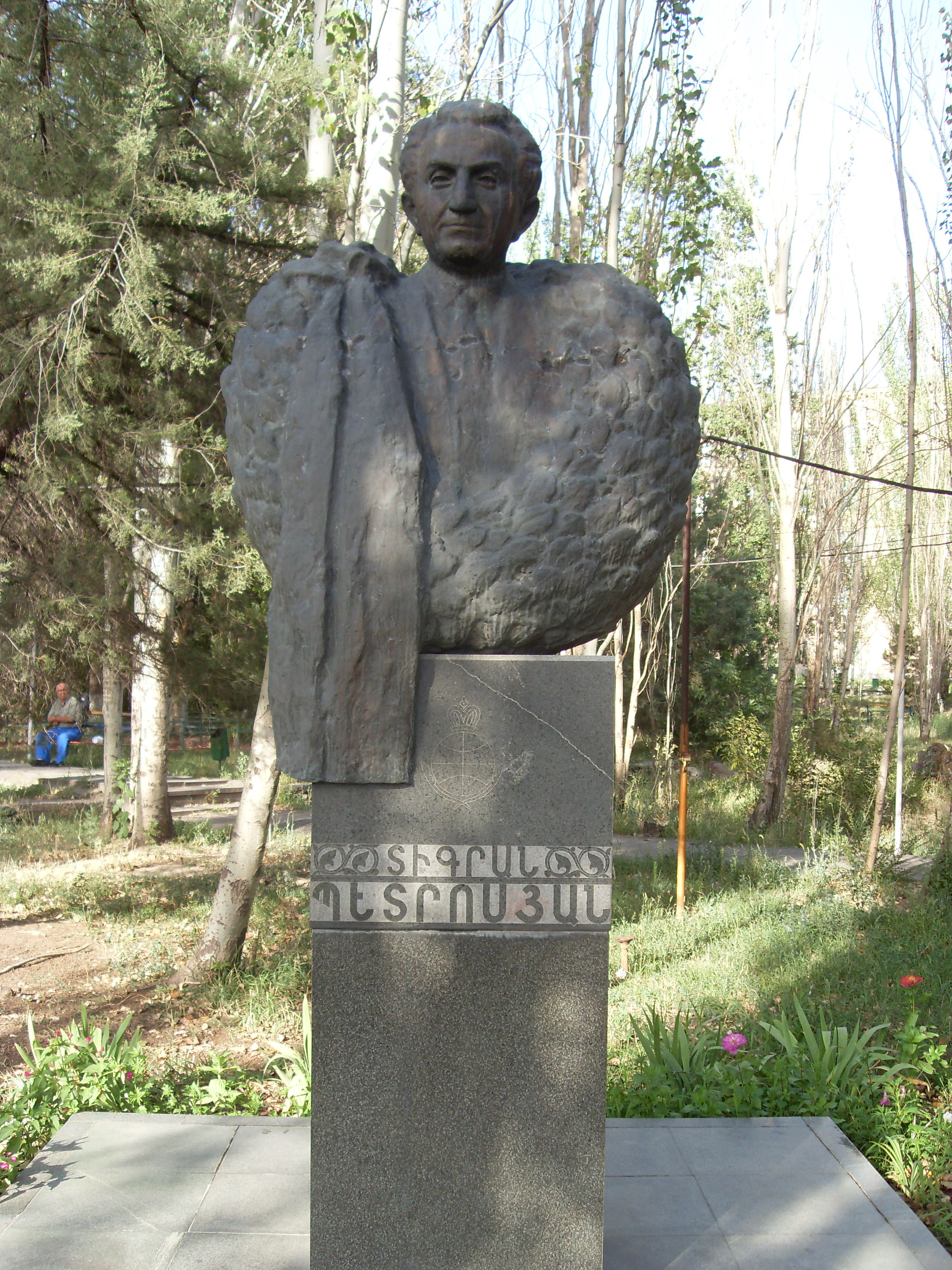
Tigran Petrosian statue

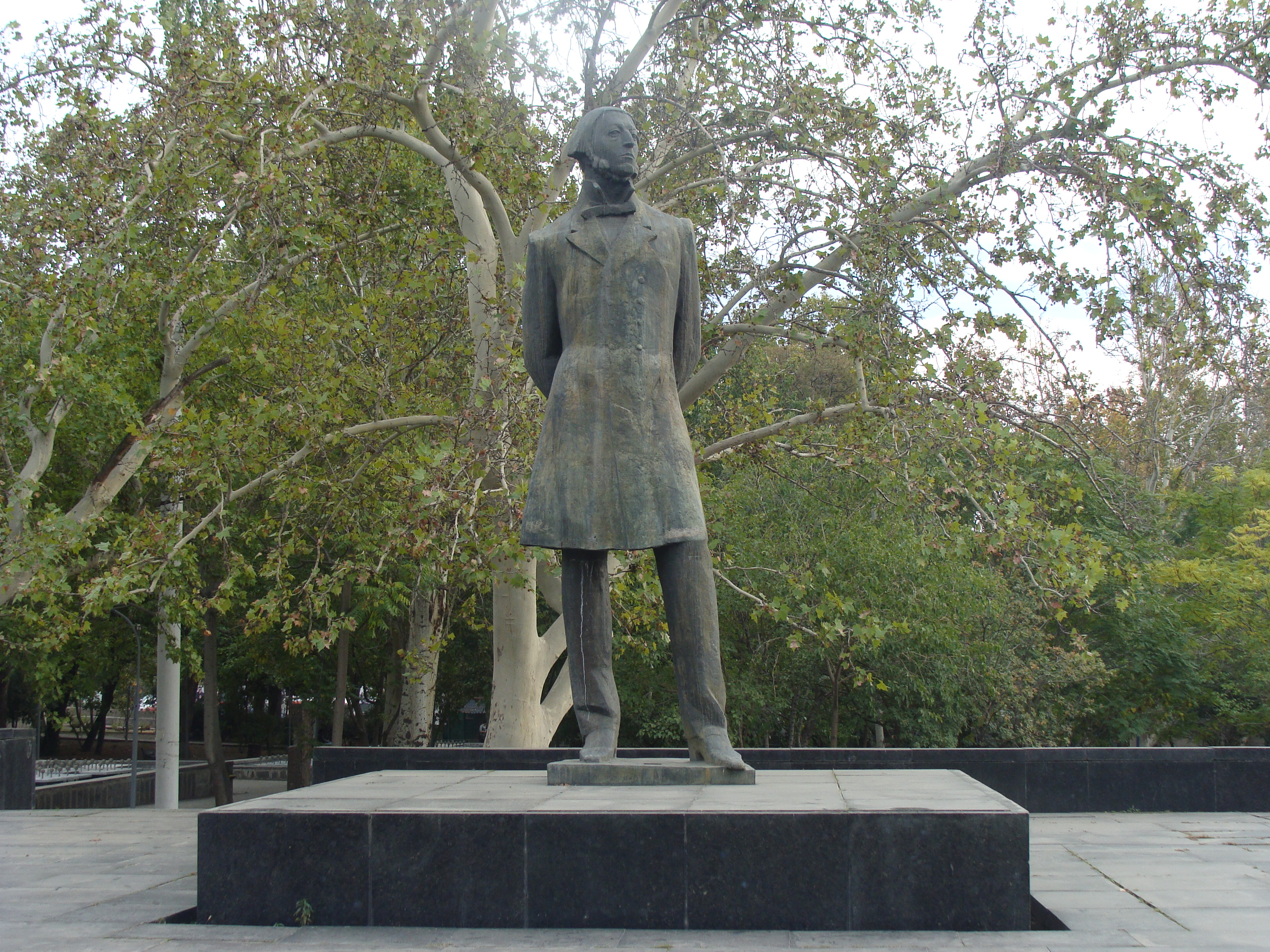
Mikael Nalbandian statue

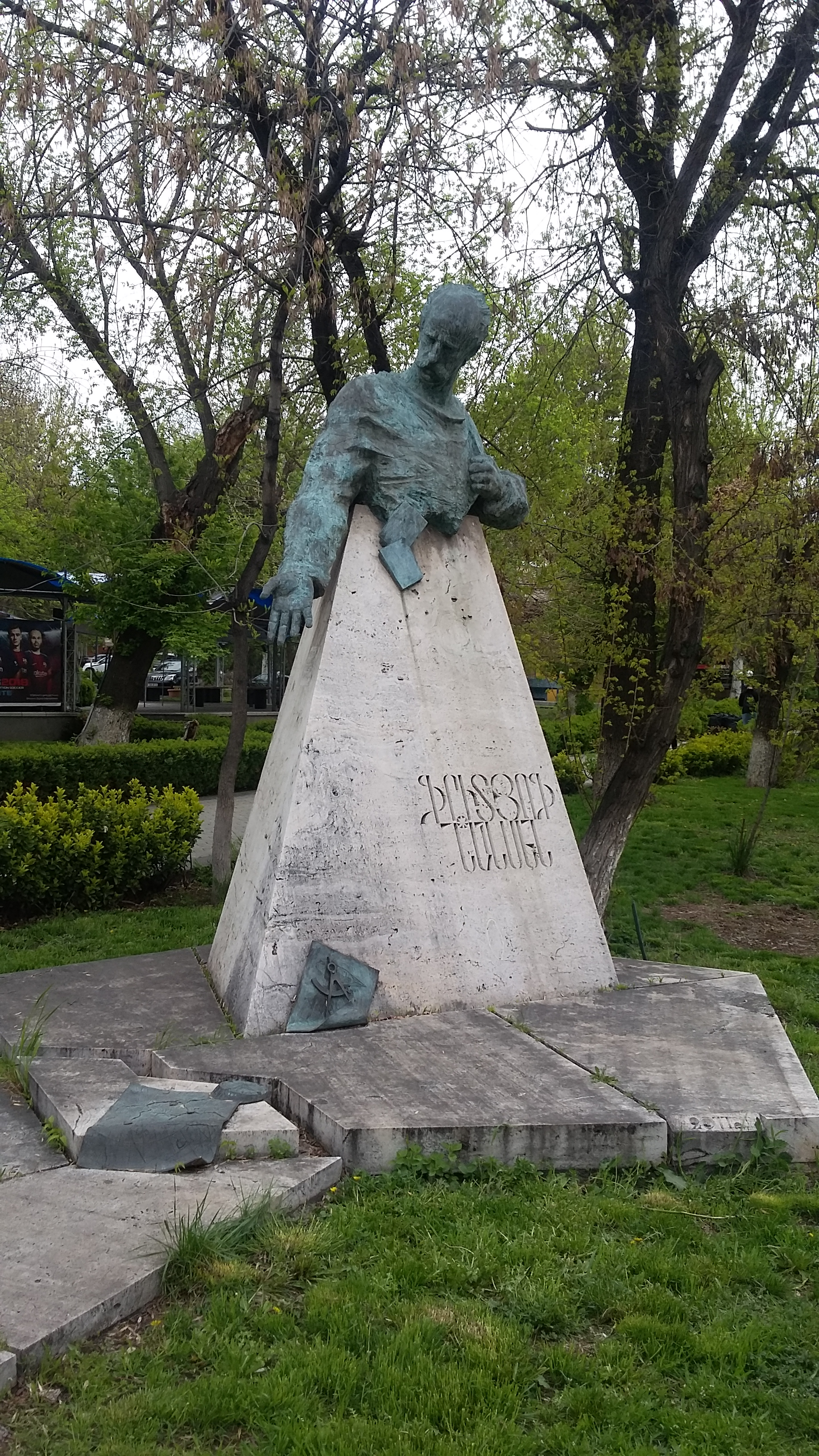
Fridtjof Nansen statue

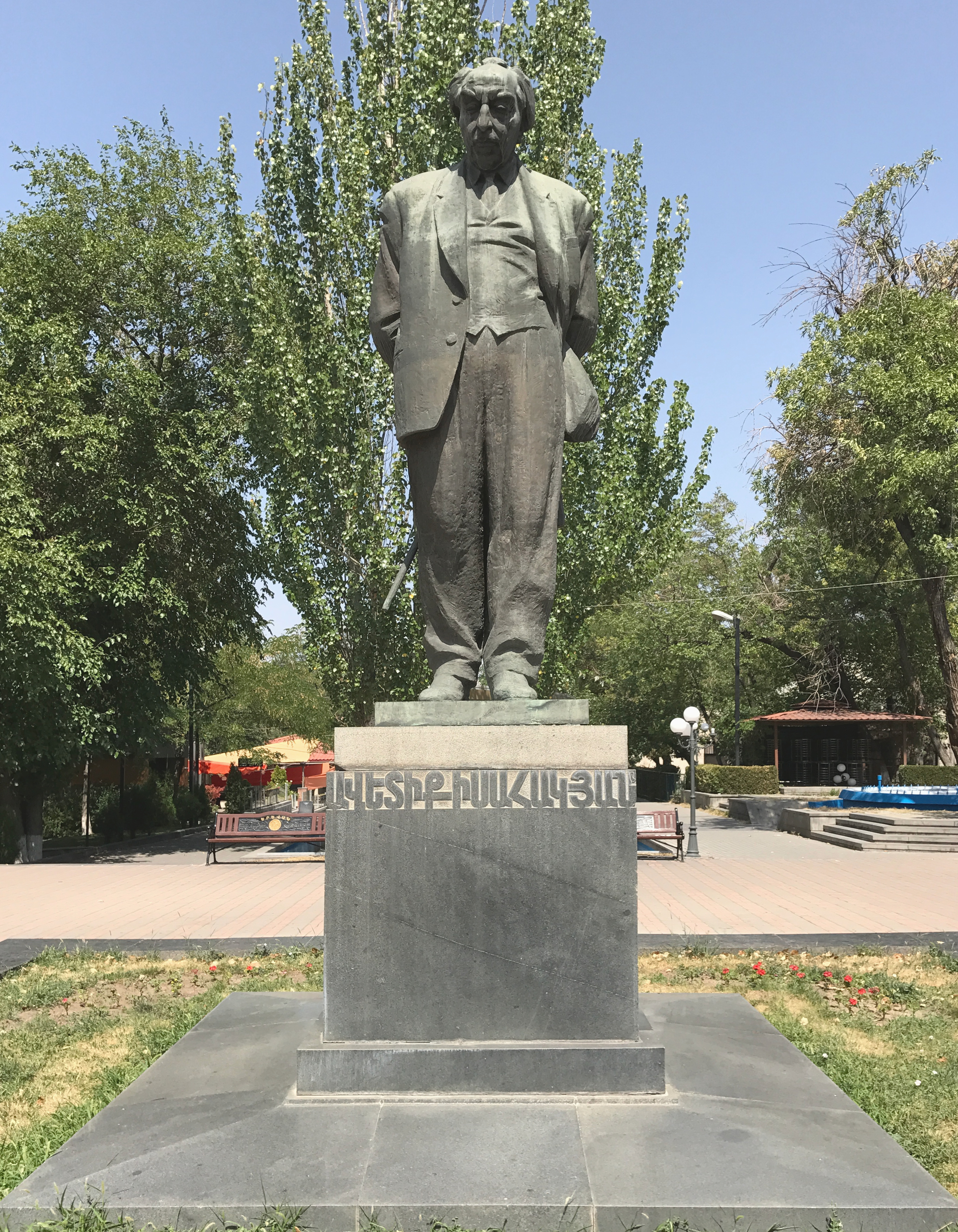
Avetik Isahakyan statue

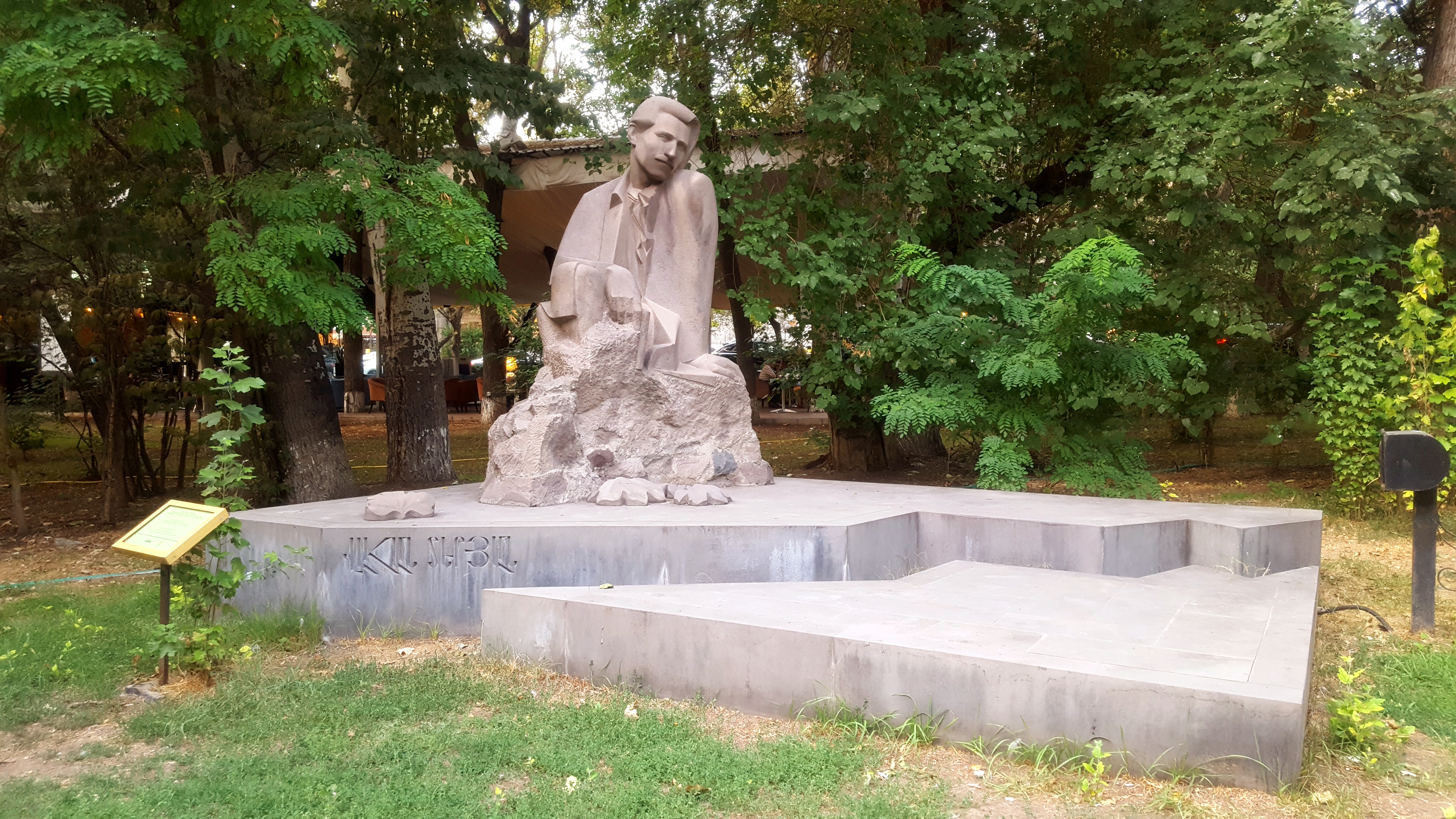
Vahan Terian statue

The benefactors' walkway of the park was opened in October 2012 featuring the statues of 6 prominent Armenian benefactors: Boghos Nubar, Aleksandr Mantashyan, Alex Manoogian, Calouste Gulbenkian, Mikael Aramyants and Hovhannes Lazaryan.

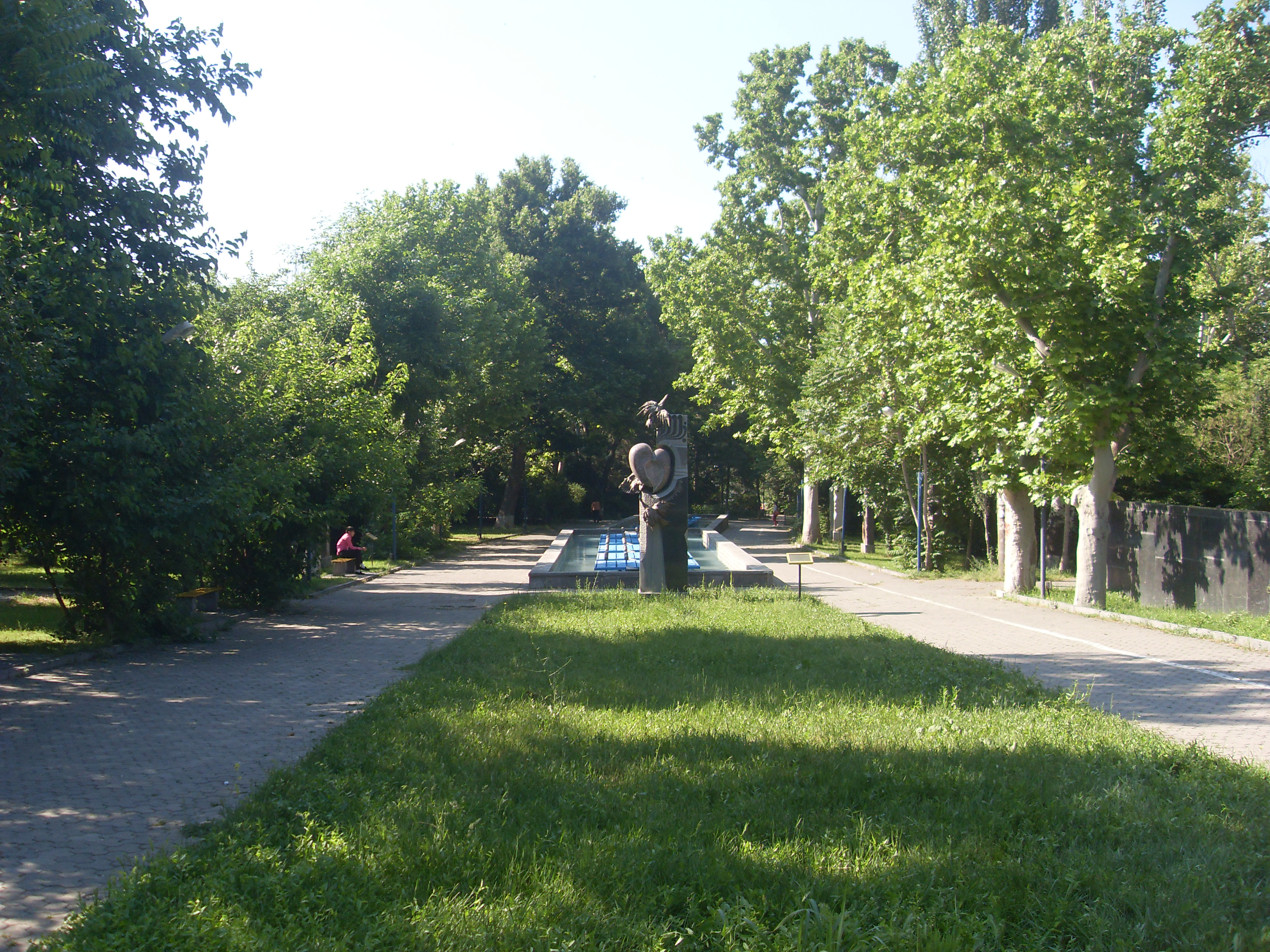
Armenian benefactor's walkway
- Other decorative monuments in the park include: the monument of Friendship between Carrara and Yerevan, the Rebirth monument, the Waiting monument and the monument dedicated to Revived Armenia.
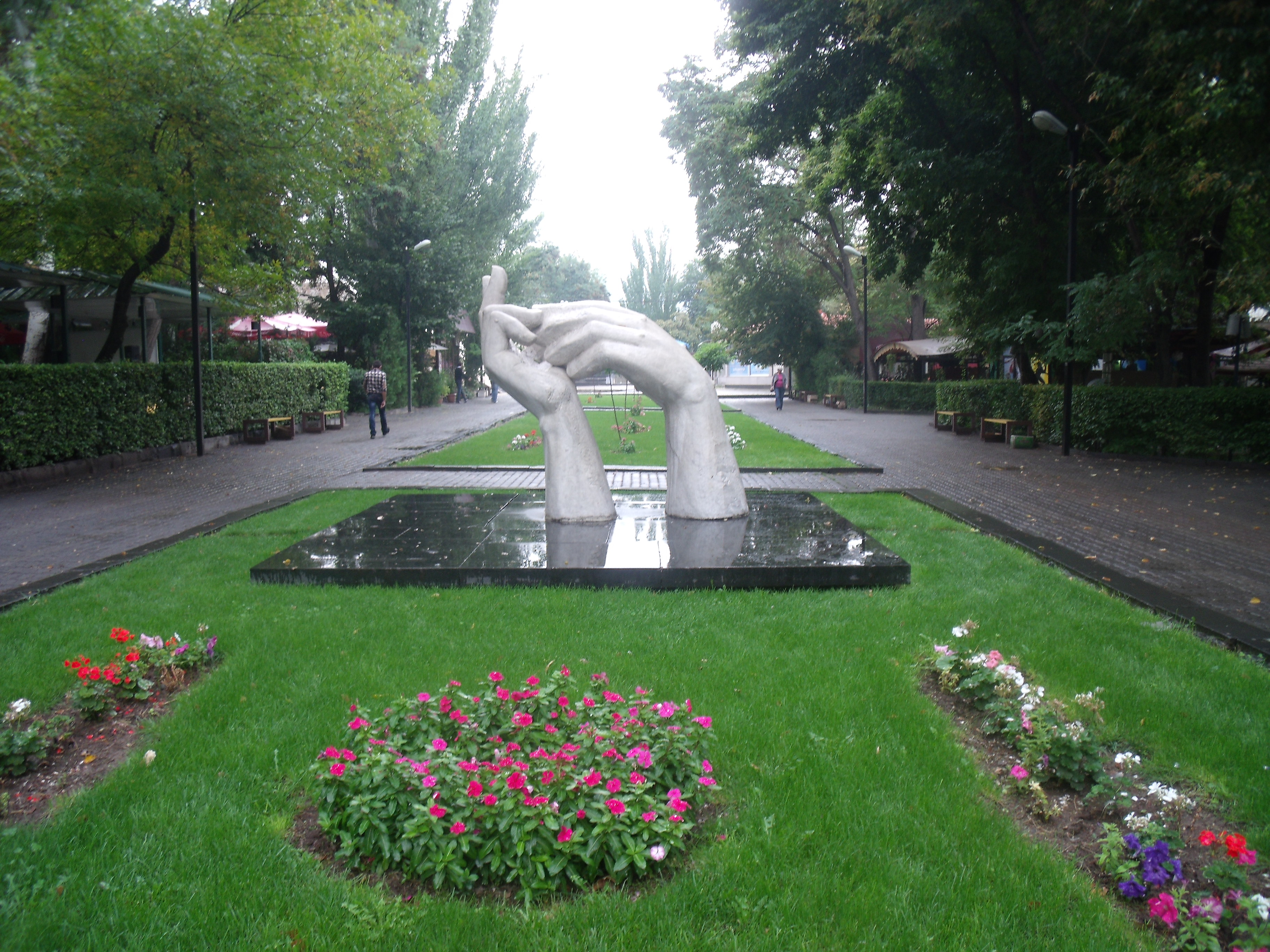
Monument of Friendship between Carrara and Yerevan

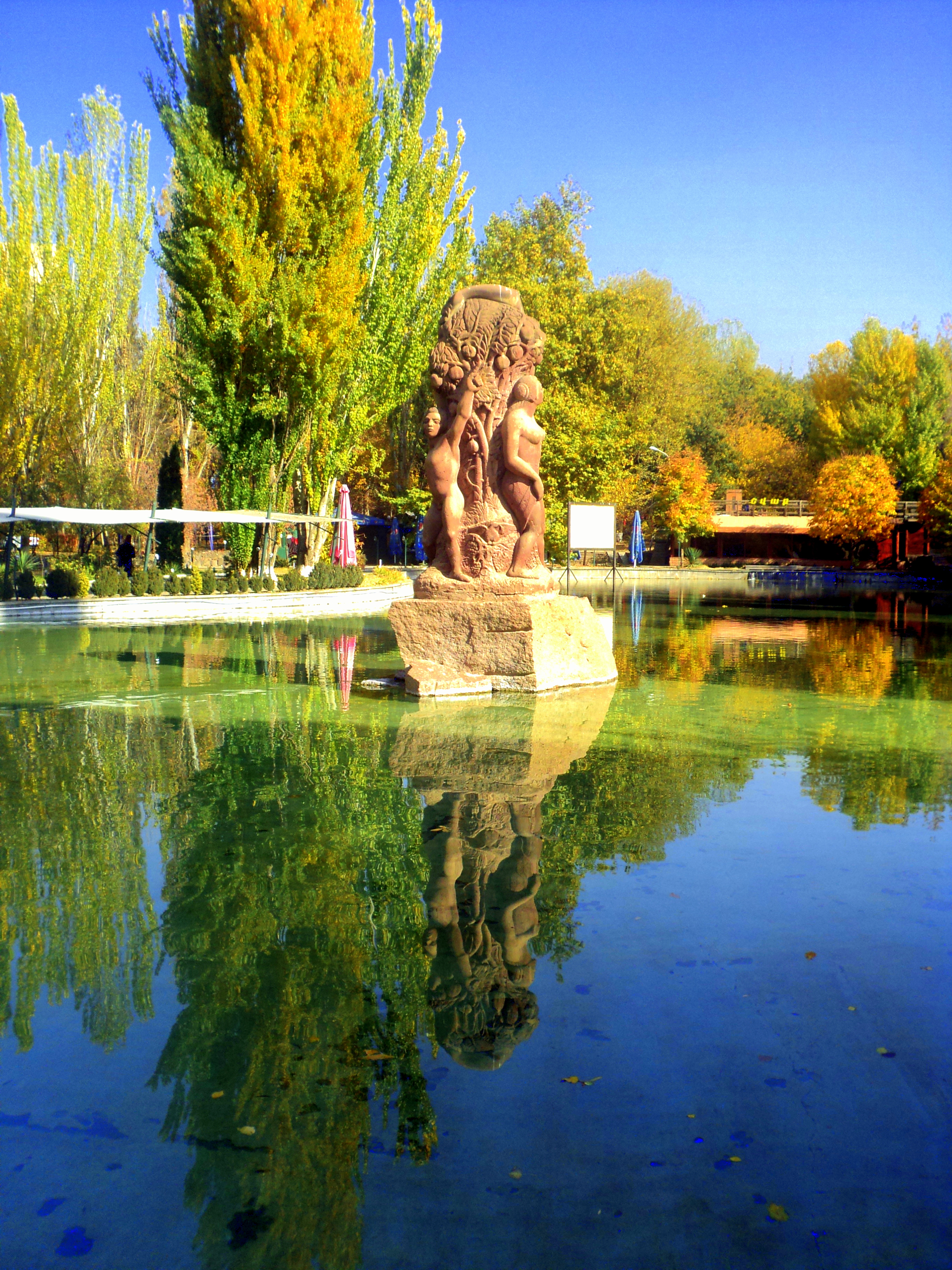
Revived Armenia
- Buildings and structures in the park include:
  - Saint Gregory the Illuminator Cathedral
  - Skate Park
  - Tekeyan Cultural Centre
  - Yerevan Chess House
  - Tennis Club of the Yerevan State University
  - Komitas Chamber Music Hall
  - Yeritasardakan underground station
  - Poplavok lake and Aragast café
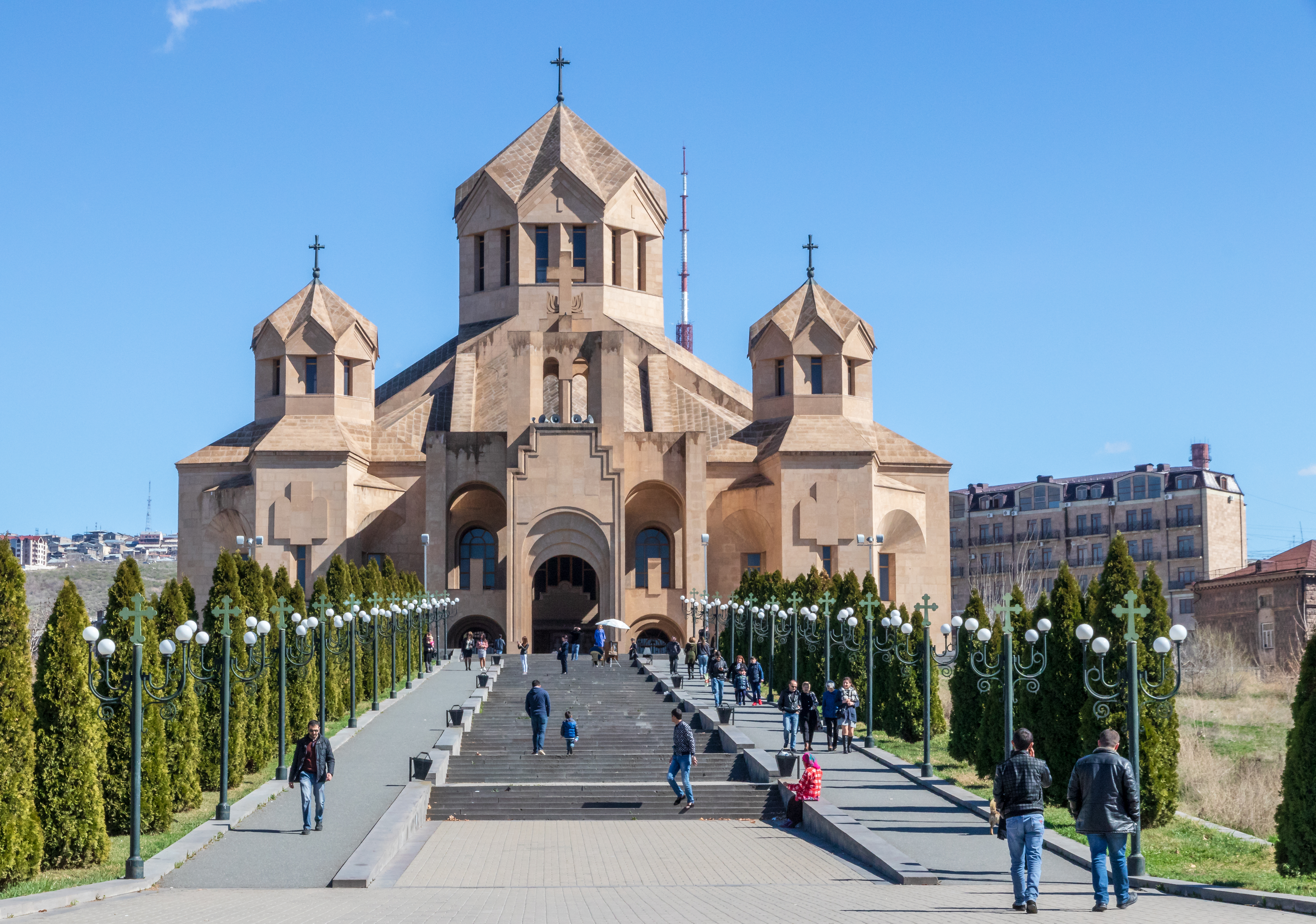
Saint Gregory the Illuminator Cathedral

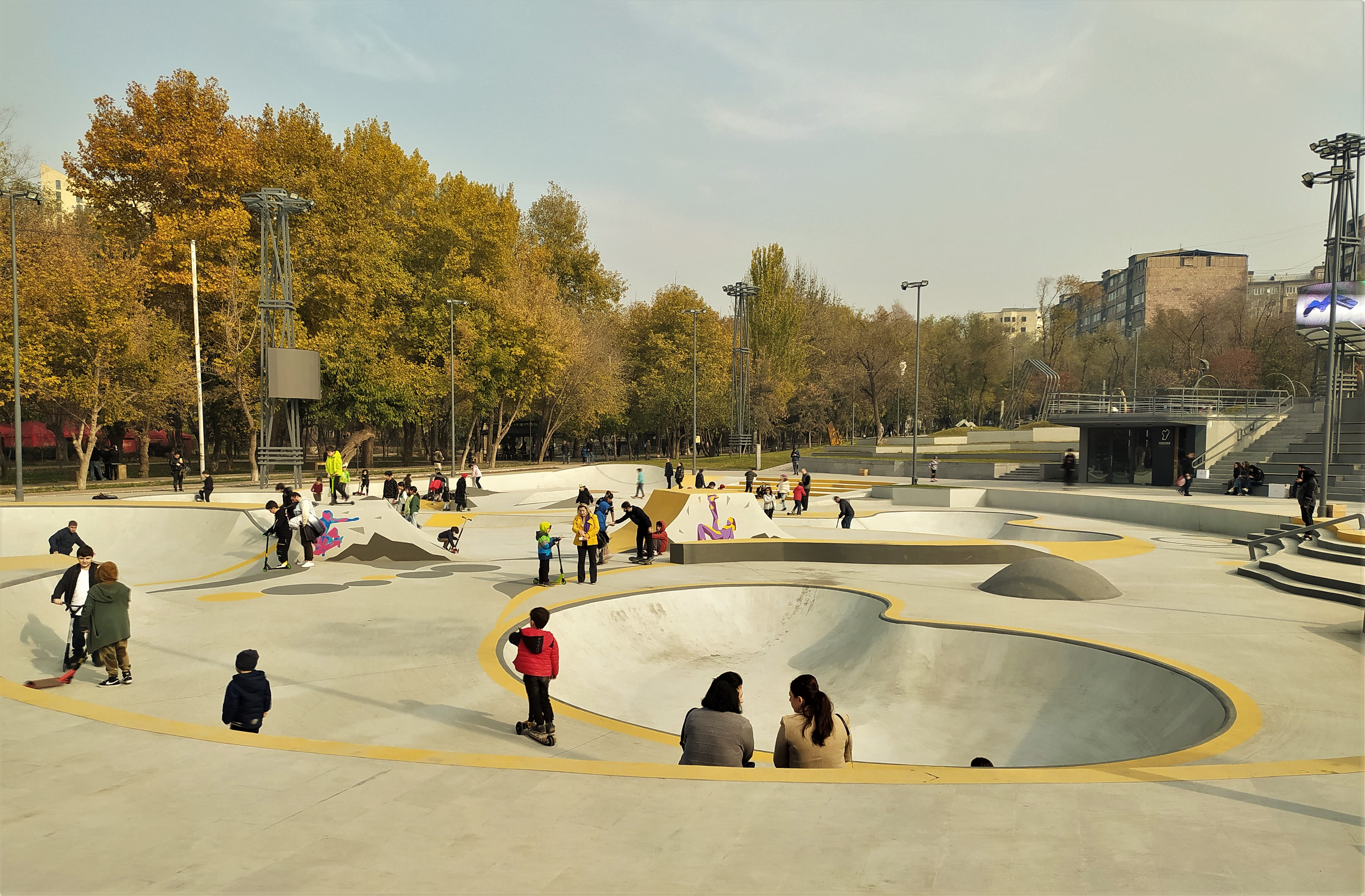
Skate Park

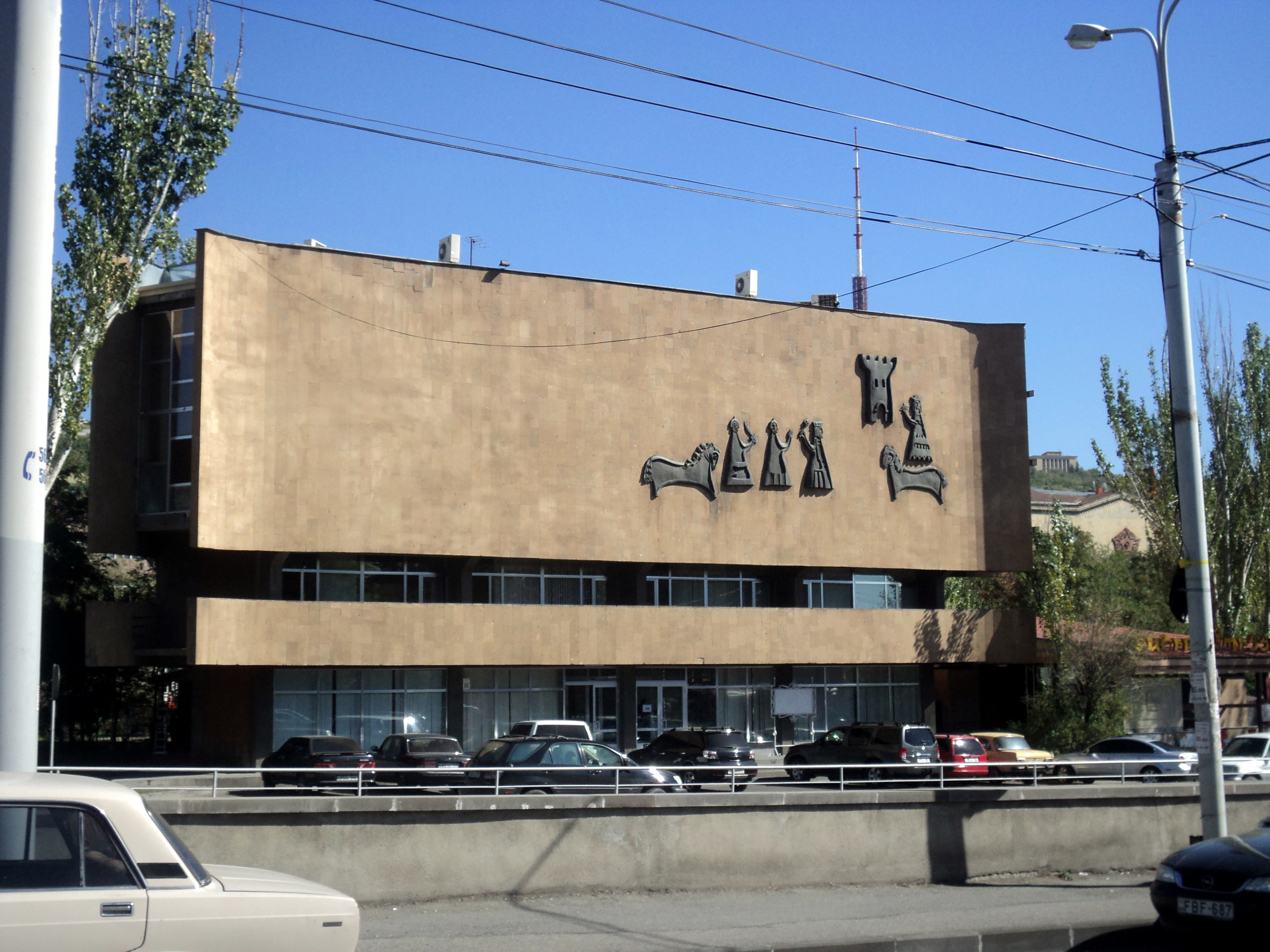
Yerevan Chess House

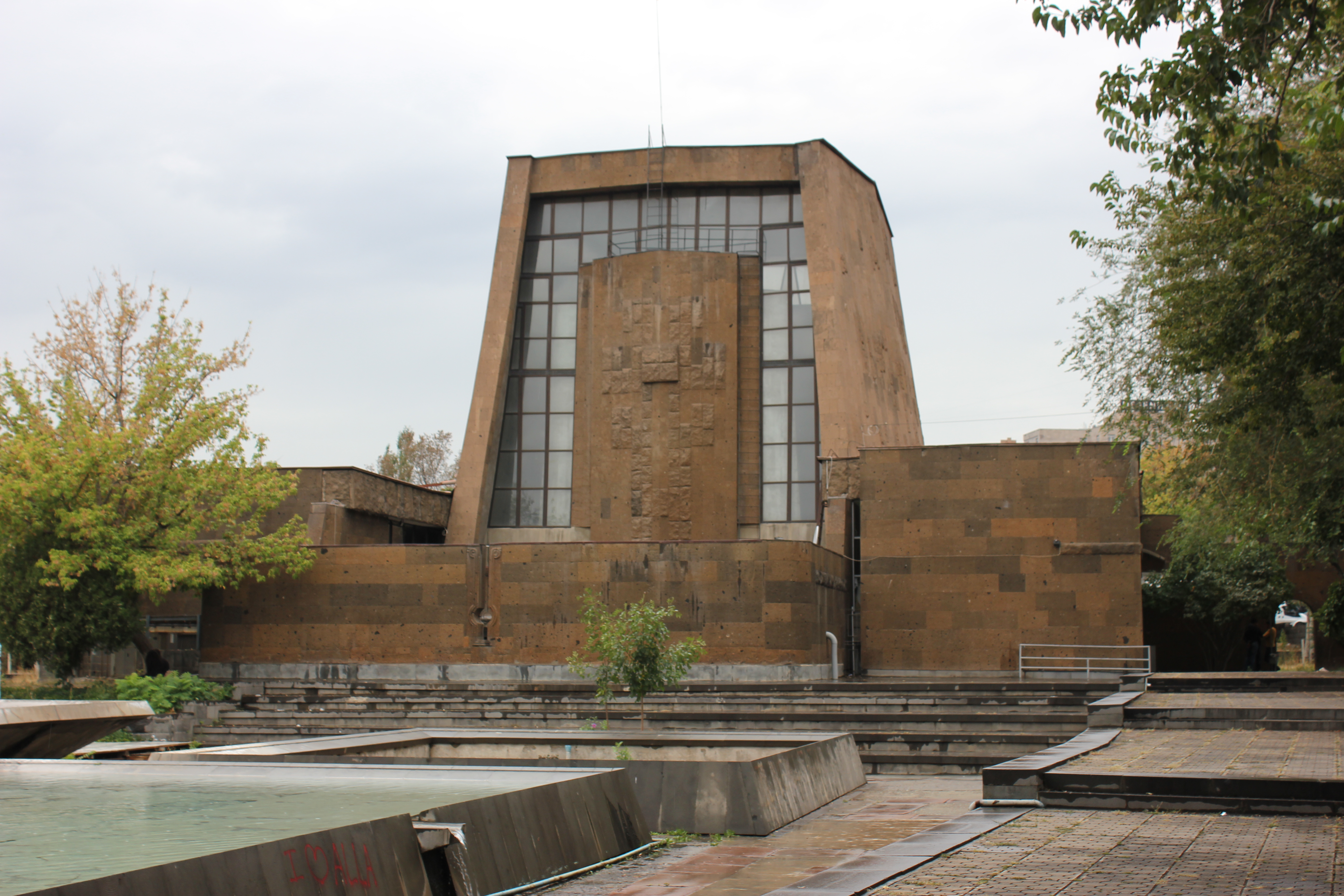
Komitas Chamber Music Hall

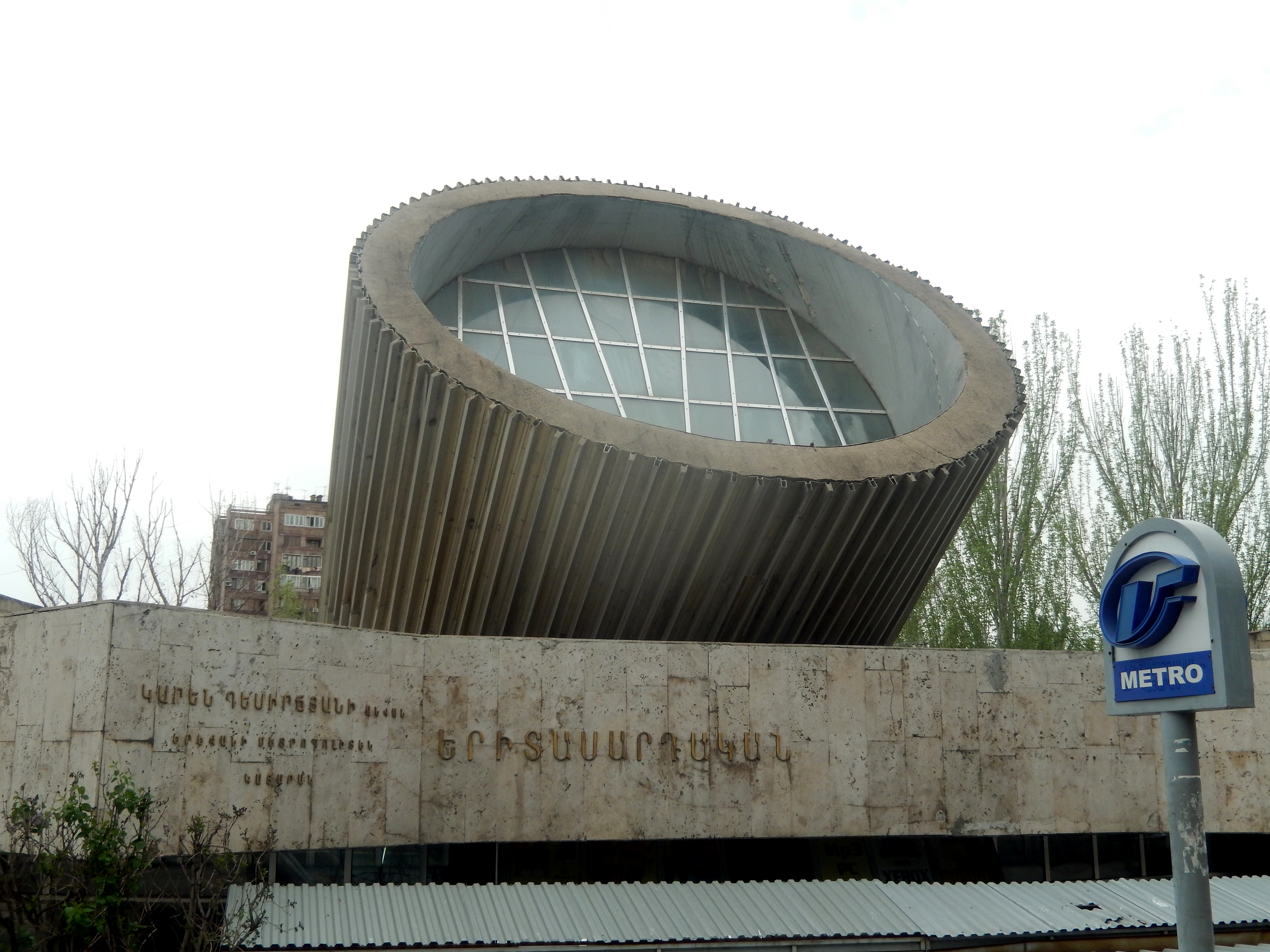
Yeritasardakan underground station

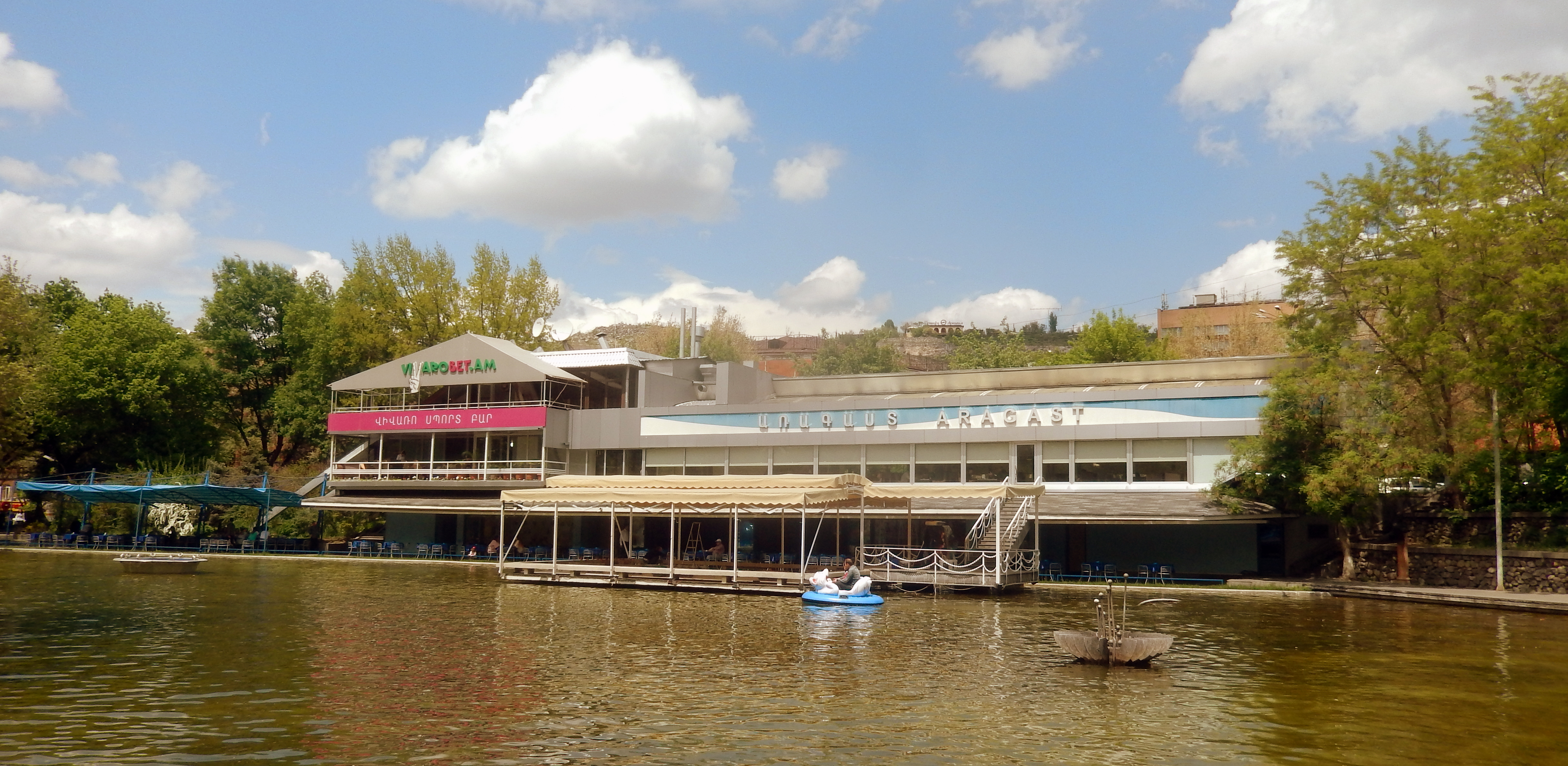
Poplavok lake and Aragast café
