= List of Armenian architects =

This is a list of notable Armenian architects.

== Medieval ==
- Eudes of Metz, or Odo von Metz (742–814) – credited as the architect of Charlemagne's Palace of Aachen with the Palatine Chapel, in Aachen.
- Momik – sculptor and a master artist of Armenian illuminated manuscripts. Designed Areni Church and Surb Astvatsatsin church at Noravank.
- Todos(ak) – medieval Armenian architect of Ateni Sioni Monastery in the Republic of Georgia.
- Trdat the Architect (c. 940s–1020) – chief architect of the Bagratuni kings of Armenia, whose 10th-century monuments have been argued to be the forerunners of Gothic architecture which came to Europe several centuries later.

== Ottoman Empire ==
- Balyan family – architects of many major buildings in Istanbul, including Dolmabahçe Palace, Beylerbeyi Palace, and Ortaköy Mosque.
- Hovsep Aznavur – designer of the Bulgarian St. Stephen Church of Istanbul.
- Kegham Kavafyan (1888–1959) – architect who designed Süreyya Opera House.
- Kirkor Bezdikyan – Mayor of Adana, designer of Büyük Saat.
- Léon Gurekian (1871–1950) – architect, writer and political activist. He was active in the Ottoman Empire, Bulgaria and Italy.
- Mihran Azaryan (1876–1952) – best known for having designed and constructed the Büyükada Pier and possibly the Izmit Clock Tower.
- Mihran Mesrobian (1889–1975) – architect whose career spanned over fifty years and in several countries.
- Mimar Sinan (1489 – 1588) – chief Armenian Ottoman architect and civil engineer for sultans Suleiman I, Selim II, and Murad III. He was, during a period of fifty years, responsible for the construction or the supervision of every major building in the Ottoman Empire. More than three hundred structures are credited to his name. He is also considered one of the world's first earthquake engineers.
- Sarkis Lole – chief architect of the city of Mardin.

== Diaspora ==
- Mardiros Altounian (1889–1958) – designed the Lebanese Parliament Building in Beirut (1931).
- Manoug Exerjian (1892–1974) – Armenian-American architect.
- Léon Gurekian (1871–1950) – made contributions in Bulgaria, Ottoman Empire and Italy.
- Martiros Kavoukjian (1908–1988) – chief municipal architect of Mosul, armenologist, historian.
- Michel Mossessian (born 1959) – design principal and founder of Mossessian & Partners in London, England.
- Ohannés Gurekian (1902–1984) – architect, engineer, and alpinist.
- Edouard Utudjian (1905–1975) – creator of the concept "underground urbanism" (urbanisme souterrain) in the 1930s. He founded the International Permanent Committee of Underground Technologies and Planning in 1937. He is the author of the books Architecture et urbanisme souterrain (1966) and L'urbanisme souterrain.
- Julian Oktawian Zachariewicz-Lwigród (1837–1898) – Polish architect and renovator.

== Russian Empire and the Soviet Union ==
- Grigor Aghababyan (1911–1977) – Soviet Armenian architect.
- Siranush Atoyan (1904–1985) – Soviet Armenian architect.
- Nikolai Bayev (1875–1952) – architect, who mainly worked in Baku.
- Mark Grigorian (1900–1978) – neoclassical architect known for building several major landmarks of Yerevan.
- Sasun Grigoryan (1942–1993) – neoclassical architect, well known for his work in the city of Leninakan and Yerevan.
- Karo Halabyan (1897–1959) – Soviet architect, led the development of the recovery plan of Stalingrad.
- Varazdat Harutyunyan (1909–2008) – architect and architectural historian.
- Margarit Hayrapetyan (1923–2004) – Soviet Armenian architect.
- Konstantine Hovhannisyan (1911–1984) – Soviet Armenian architect, architectural historian, and archaeologist.
- Rafayel Israyelian (1908–1973) – Soviet Armenian architect.
- Hovhannes Khalpakhchian (1907–1996) – Soviet Armenian architect and architectural historian.
- Miron Merzhanov (1895–1975) – Soviet architect, notable for being the de facto personal architect of Joseph Stalin in 1933–1941.
- Stepan Mnatsakanian (1917–1994) – Soviet Armenian architect, head of the department of architecture at the Institute of Arts for the Armenian National Academy of Sciences.
- Pertchanush Msryan (1914–2009) – architect and civil engineer.
- Alexander Rotinoff (1875–1934) – architect and engineer of late 19th and early 20th century throughout the Caucasus.
- Vartan Sarkisov (1875–1955) – Soviet architect, designer of the Oil Producers Sanatorium building in Mardaka.
- Alexander Tamanian (1878–1936) – neoclassical architect, known for his work in the city of Yerevan.
- Arthur Tarkhanyan (1932–2006) – Soviet architect, notable for Tsitsernakaberd, Yerevan Youth Palace, Karen Demirchyan Complex.
- Anna Ter-Avetikian (1908–2013) – first Armenian woman to become an architect.
- Gabriel Ter-Mikelov (1874–1949) – prominent architect, designer of Saint Thaddeus and Bartholomew Cathedral in Baku.
- Tamar Tumanyan (1907–1989) – Soviet Armenian architect that worked in Alexander Tamanian's studio, daughter of Hovhannes Tumanyan.

== Modern ==
- Maxim Atayants (born 1966) – Russian-Armenian architect, designer, and professor of architectural history.
- Baghdasar Arzoumanian (1916–2001) – designer of Erebuni Museum and Holy Trinity Church.
- Arthur Meschian (born 1949) – popular musician, singer, and architect.
- Armen Hakhnazarian (1941–2009) – Founding Director of Research on Armenian Architecture.
- Murad Hasratyan (1935–2026) – architect and architectural historian.
- Artak Ghulyan (1958–2025) – designer of Armenian Cathedral of Moscow.
- Narek Sargsyan (born 1959) – Chairman of the State Committee of Urban Development of Armenia, Chief Architect of Yerevan.

== See also ==
- List of architects
- List of Armenians
