= Margarit Hayrapetyan =

- Born: Margarit Vahagni Hayrapetyan; 27 November 1923; Batumi, GSSR, TSFSR, Soviet Union
- Died: 2 August 2004 (aged 80); Yerevan, Armenia
- Other name: Margarit Hayrapetyan
- Occupation: architect
- Notable work: Hovhannes Tumanyan Puppet Theatre of Yerevan

Margarit Vahagni Hayrapetyan (Armenian: Մարգարիտ Հայրապետյան: 27 November 1923 – 2 August 2004) was Armenian architect. She became a member of the Armenian Union of Architects in 1953 and was awarded the title Honored Architect of the Armenian SSR in 1971.

== Biography ==
Margarit Hayrapetyan was born on 27 November 1923 in Batumi. In 1949, she graduated from the Yerevan Polytechnic Institute. From 1963 to 1983, she worked at the Yerevan Project Institute; from 1983 to 1988, at the Yerevan branch of the Moscow Soyuzsportproekt Institute.

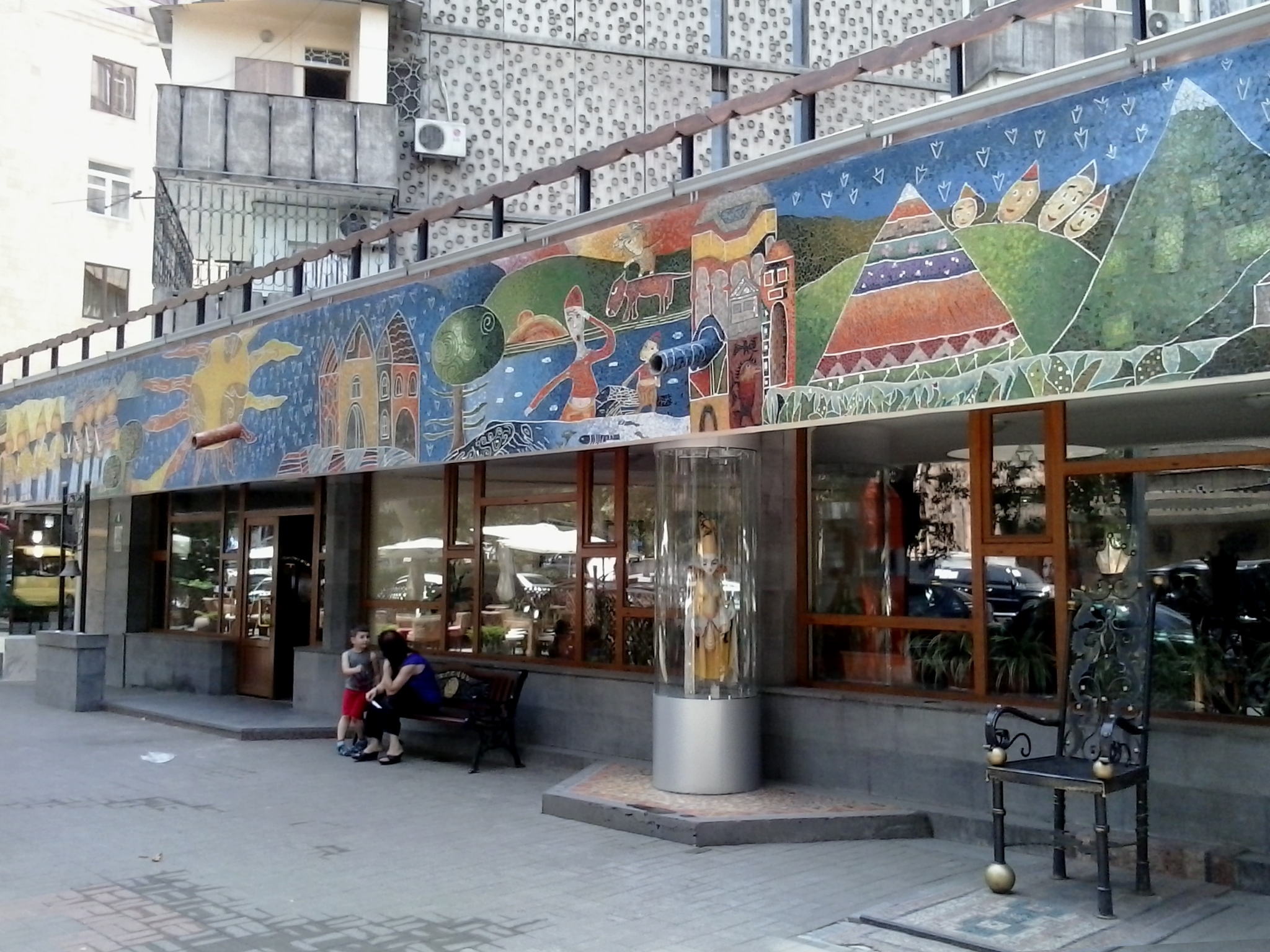
The building of the Yerevan Puppet Theater

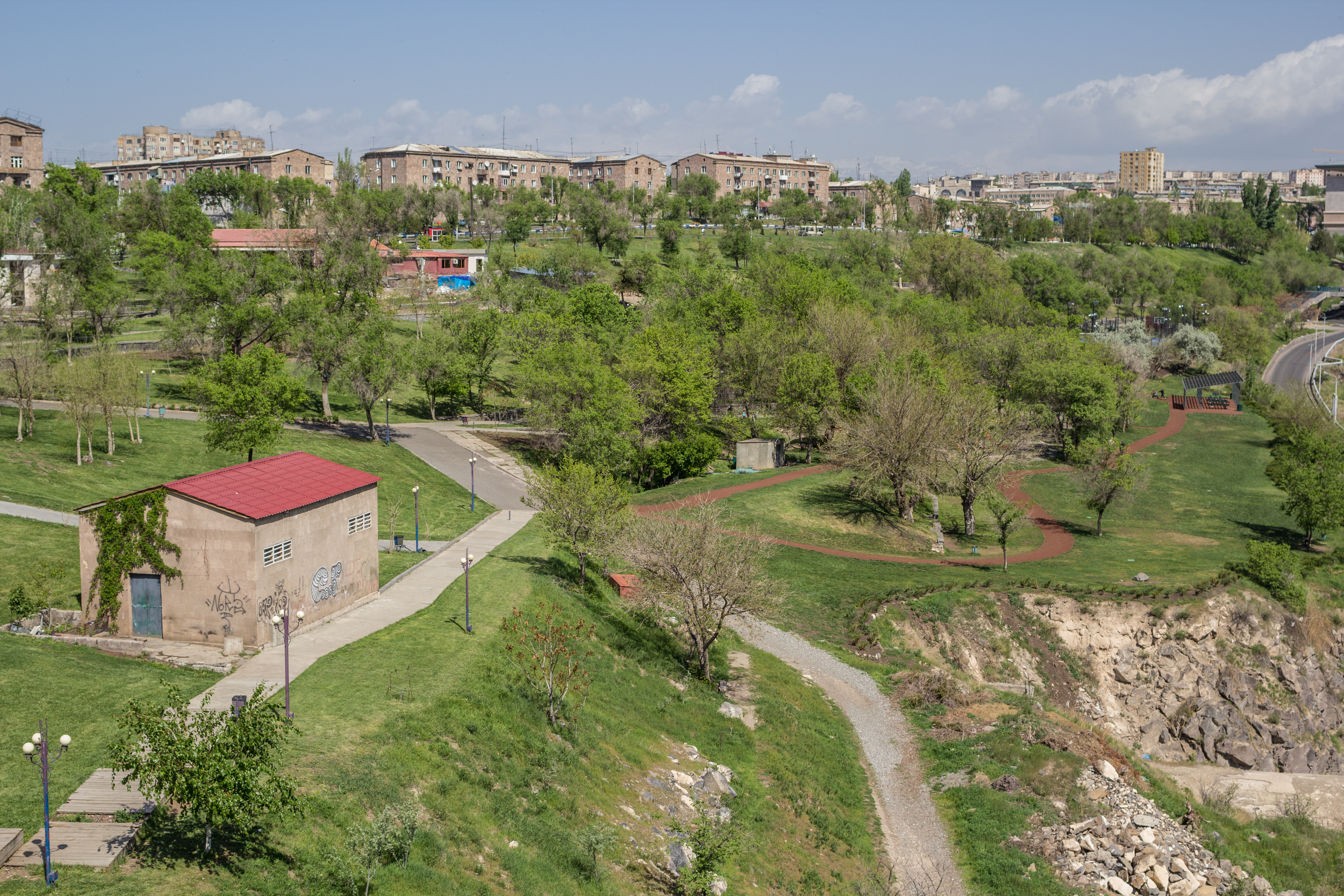
Tumanyan Park in Yerevan

== Famous Works ==
- Yerevan Puppet Theater building - 1968, theater interior - 1975
- Residential building next to the Yerevan Puppet Theater on Sayat-Nova Avenue
- The first section of the circular park was completed in 1963, and the fourth section of the Circular Park in 1968
- Tumanyan Park and a decorative fountain there, 1981
- The Hrazdan River Coastal Swimming Pool Complex
- Technical Project of the Kond Microdistrict, 1975–1980
- Sports facilities in Tsaghkadzor, Artashat, Bakuriani
- A swimming pool complex on the banks of the Hrazdan River in Yerevan
- Water sports complex in Artashat
- Water sports complex in Gali
- Leninakan Puppet Theater Project

== Awards ==
- Honored Architect of the Armenian SSR (1971)
- Lieutenant of the All-Union Competition "Best Building of the Year", 1985
