= Pertchanush Msryan =

- Born: Pertchanush Msryan; 14 August 1914; Alexandrapol, Erivan Governorate, Caucasus Viceroyalty, Russian Empire
- Died: 12 January 2009 (aged 94); Yerevan, Armenia
- Other names: Pertchanush Hambardzumi Msryan-Oksuzyan
- Occupation: architect
- Notable work: Avetik Isahakyan House-Museum (Yerevan)

Pertchanush Hambardzumi Msryan-Oksuzyan (Armenian: Պերճանուշ Համբարձումի Մսրյան-Օքսուզյան: 14 August 1914 – 12 January 2009) was Armenian woman architect, Civil Engineer. Member of the Armenian Union of Architects (1943), Honoured Builder of Armenia (1967).

== Biography ==
Pertchanush Msryan was born on 14 August 1914 in Alexandrapol. In 1938, she graduated from the Yerevan Polytechnic Institute. From 1960 to 1970, she was the head of the planning and development department of the Armenian SSR state construction, and from 1970 to 1980, she taught at the Alexander Tamanyan Construction Technical School.

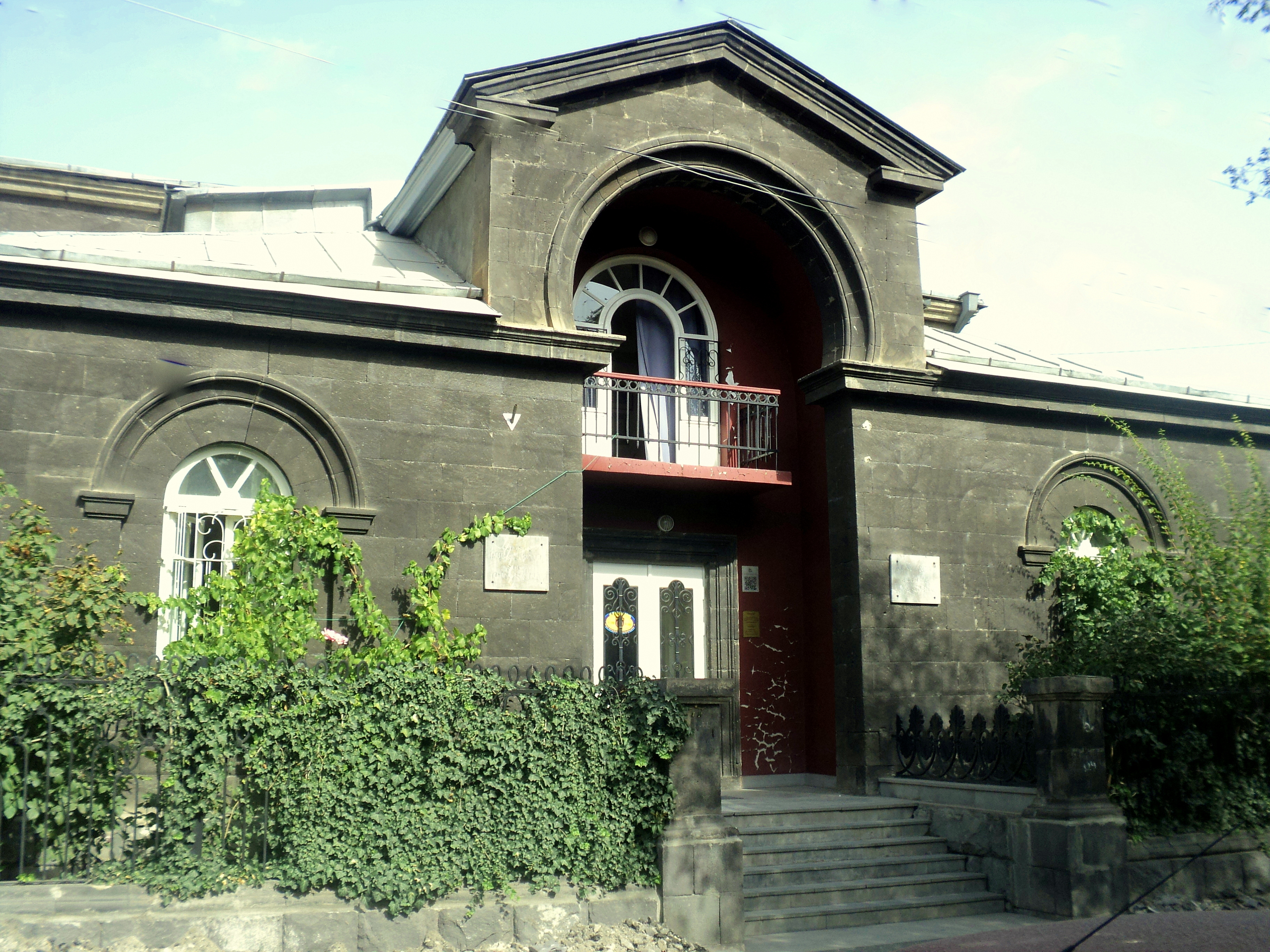
Avetik Isahakyan's House-Museum, architect Perchanush Msryan, 1963

== Significant projects ==
- Jermuk Resort Town Master Plan (1945)
- Detailed Planning Project for the Center of Yerevan (1938)
- Detailed planning project for the Nor Aresh, Nork, Shahumyan, Southwestern, and Southeastern districts of Yerevan. Planning and landscaping of the "Victory" and A. Pushkin parks, planning and landscaping of the gorge and Paskevich hill in the Hrazdan region
- Planning and landscaping of residential districts in the center and outskirts of Yerevan
- Residential house on Charents Street, Yerevan
- Avetik Isahakyan's house-museum, private houses on Baghramyan Avenue
- Management of the Yerevan Polyvinyl Acetate Factory
- Boarding houses in the Jermuk health resort. Improvement of the Jermuk city park
- Participation in the development of the "Greater Yerevan" general program (1951)
- Project for the construction of Baghramyan, Sayat Nova Avenues, and Charents street in Yerevan

== Awards ==
- Honorary Diploma of the Presidium of the Supreme Soviet of the Armenian SSR (1945)
- Honored Builder of Armenia (1967)
