= Sarkis Lole =

Armenian architect

Mimarbașı Sarkis Lole
- Born: 19th century
- Died: 20th century
- Occupation: Architect

Sarkis Elyas Lole (Armenian: Սարգիս Լոլե Գիզոյի, romanized: Sargis Lole Gizoyi), also known as Levon, was a prominent Armenian architect of the Ottoman Empire. Lole was the chief architect (Turkish: Mimarbași) of Mardin and responsible for much of the late nineteenth- to early twentieth-century architecture of the city, as well as in neighboring Diyarbakır.

Due to his architectural skills and accomplishments, Lole is known as the “Mimar Sinan” of Mardin. He worked to preserve the homogeneity of the old town uniting the local style of Classical, Christian, and Islamic architecture. He built new schools, courthouses, barracks, mansions, and churches in Mardin, as well as, making repairs to the various historical mosques and madrasas of the city. Although working under the supervision of the central state, Lole's company functioned as private and managed a monopoly over the architectural landscape of Mardin.

== History ==
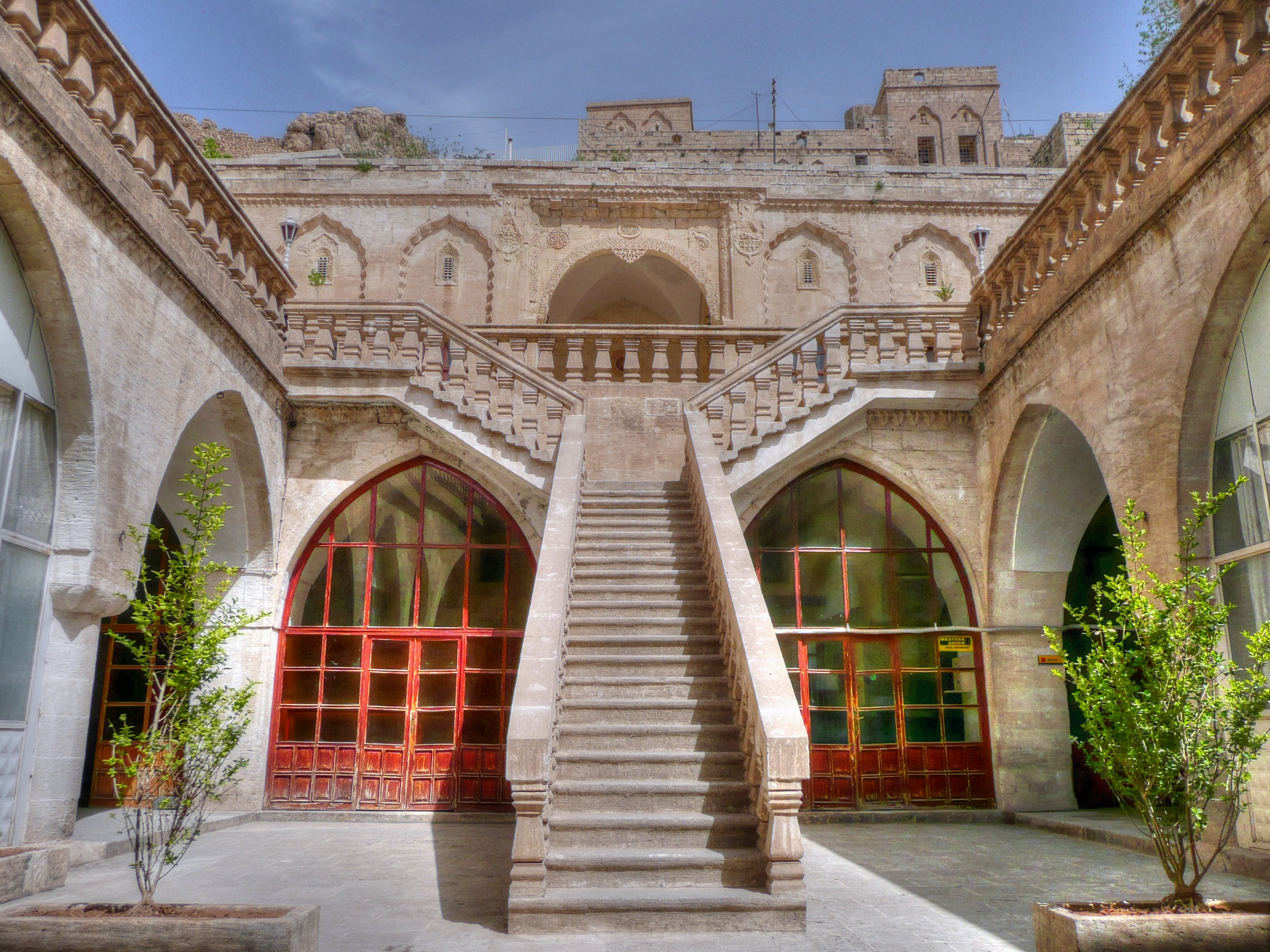
Staircase of Mardin post office, designed by Sarkis Lole and showing his syncretic style of European Renaissance and Islamic architecture

Sarkis Lole learned much about architecture from his father and is not known to have had any professional training. He was known to design his buildings by drawing in the sand. Lole was appointed the chief architect of Mardin by the Imperial Architects office of the Ottoman Empire; he inherited this position from his father who held it before him. His architectural style was said to be sophisticated in that he interspersed elements of European Renaissance and Gothic architecture within the local Islamic architectural framework of the city. Although having worked in Beirut, Lole is not known to have travelled to Europe. Moreover, as with other Ottoman Armenian architects of that time period such as Balyan and Nafilian, Lole chose rather to base his architecture on the predominant identity and cultures of the regions he worked in rather than on Armenian architecture.

Lole commanded a team of apprentices that continued to carry out his architectural legacy after his death. From the memoirs of his descendants and those who worked on his team, Lole was responsible for a great deal of the architecture of Mardin, including the majority of the 19th-century mansions, churches, institutions, and even Islamic structures such as Mosques. In addition, Lole worked throughout Lebanon, notably in Beirut and Zahle. These accomplishments enabled Lole to be a very wealthy man and that wealth passed down to his descendants in Lebanon. Lole had a son named Corç Ertaş Kalfa who also worked as an architect in Mardin.

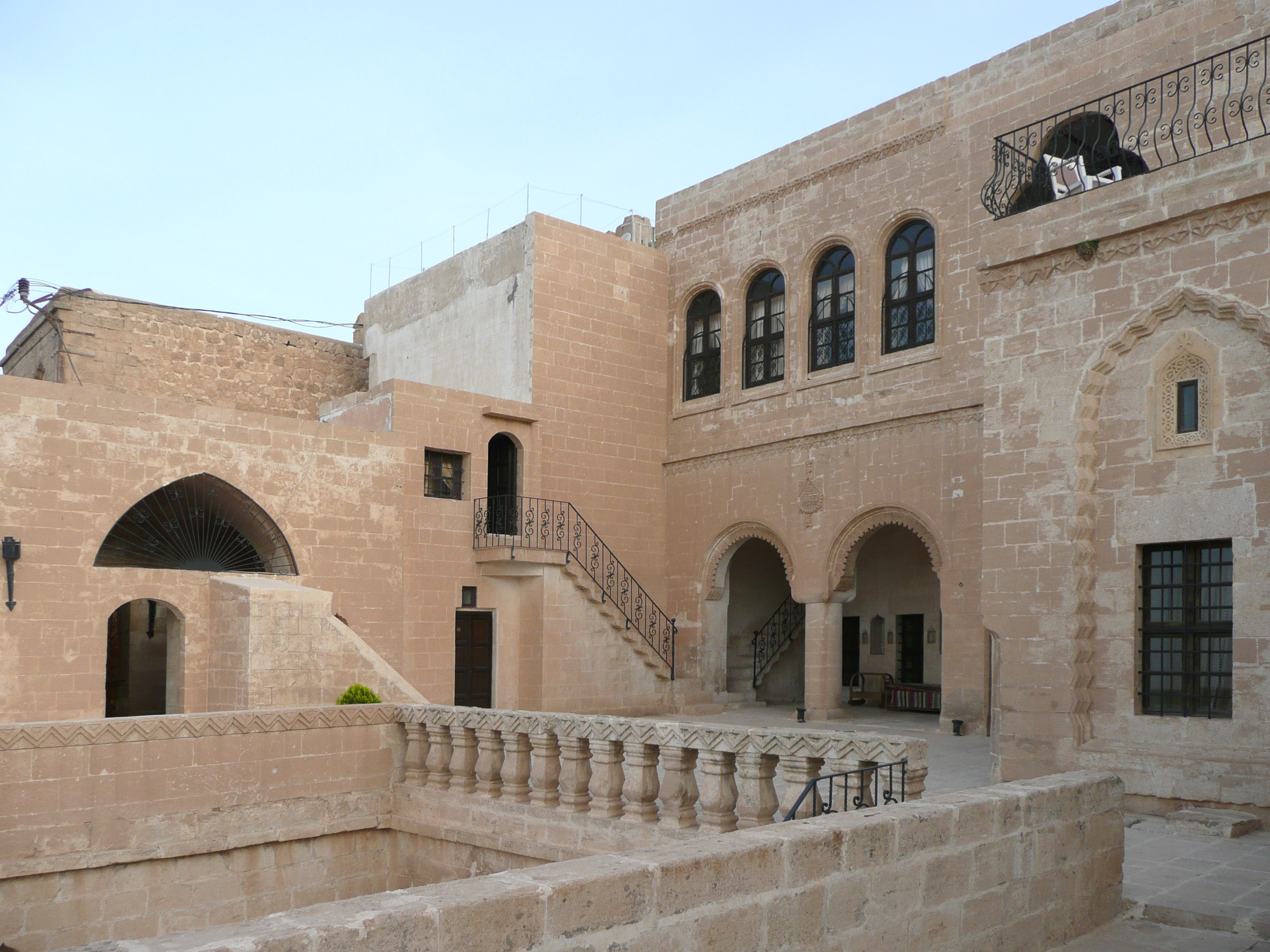
19th-century mansion in Mardin

In 2011, under the instruction of the mayor of Mardin, the Turkish government proposed to restore the tomb of Sarkis Lole, as well as name a district after him. Previously, there was a street named after Lole in Mardin. According to Turkologist Andranik Ispiryan, this act was purely for the purpose of publicity. The Turkish government said they would contact Lole's descendants who now live in Aleppo and Beirut for consent on restoring Lole's tomb.

== Works ==
Some of Lole's most prominent architectural works include:

- The Mardin Post Office/The Șahtana house
- The Mardin Museum
- The Vocational School for girls
- Minaret of Șehidye Mosque
- Surp Hovsep Armenian Catholic Church of Mardin
- Gozelsheikh Mansion of Cinar, Diyarbakir
- Armenian Catholic Church of Diyarbakir
- American University of Beirut
- Hotel America, Zahle

== See also ==
- List of Armenian architects

== Sources ==
- Biner, Zerrin Ozlem (2020). States of Dispossession: Violence and Precarious Coexistence in Southeast Turkey (1 ed.). Philadelphia: University of Pennsylvania Press. ISBN 9780812296594.
- Wharton, Alyson (2016). "Armenian Architects Reshaping the Ottoman East in the Hamidian Era (1876–1909)". In Alison Ohta; J.M. Rogers; Rosalind Wade Haddon look (eds.). Art, Trade and Culture in the Islamic World and Beyond: From the Fatimids to the Mughals. United Kingdom: Gingko Library. pp. 124–137. ISBN 9781909942905.
- Wharton, Alyson (2015). "Identity and Style: Armenian-Ottoman Churches in the Nineteenth Century". In Gharipour Mohammad (ed.). Sacred Precincts: The Religious Architecture of Non-Muslim Communities Across the Islamic World. Vol. 3. Brill. pp. 76–105. ISBN 978-90-04-28022-9.
- Perka, A. Ş. (2003). "Tarih ve toplum: aylık ansiklopedik dergi" [History and Society: Monthly Encyclopedic Journal] (in Turkish). 40. Istanbul: İletişim Yayınları. ISSN 1019-4681.
- Incedayi, Deniz (2016). "Mimar.ist Sayı 55" [Architecture Number 55] (in Turkish). Chamber of Architects: Istanbul Metropolitan Branch. ISSN 1302-8219.
- Çağlayan, Murat (2017). Mardin ortaçağ anıtları ve yapım teknikleri [Mardin medieval monuments and construction techniques] (in Turkish). Turkey: Hiperyayın. ISBN 9786052015285.
- Yașari, Irem (2019). "Mardin: A short trip to a mystical realm". Daily Sabah.
- Ispiryan, Andranik (2011). "Թուրքիայի վարչապետը փորձում է հայ ճարտարապետի գերեզմանի նորոգումն օ" [The Prime minister of Turkey to repair tomb of Armenian architect] (in Armenian). News.am.
- Alp, Mesut (2017). Mardin: From Tales to Legends (PDF). Turkey: European Union-Mardin Sustainble Tourism Project. Archived from the original (PDF) on 21 November 2022.
