= Anna Ter-Avetikian =

- Born: Anna Tigranovna Ter-Avetikian; 23 October 1908; Yerevan, Erivan Governorate, Russian Empire
- Died: 16 January 2013 (aged 104); Yerevan, Armenia
- Other names: Anna Ter-Avetikyan
- Occupation: architect
- Years active: 1926-1972
- Known for: first woman architect of Armenia
- Notable work: "Sasuntsi Tavit" cinema and Ponchikanots building

Anna Tigranovna Ter-Avetikian (Armenian: Աննա Տեր-Ավետիքյան, Russian: Анна Тер Аветикян: 10 October 1908 (O.S.) / 23 October 1908 (N.S.) – 16 January 2013) was the first Armenian woman to become an architect. She designed numerous notable buildings throughout the country and was the recipient of several national prizes for her work.

== Early life ==
Anna Tigranovna Ter-Avetikian was born on 23 October 1908 in Yerevan, which at the time was in the Erivan Governorate of the Russian Empire. At the time that Armenia was annexed to Russia from the Ottoman Empire, her ancestors were granted a noble title from Nicholas I of Russia for providing assistance and medical supplies to General Ivan Paskevich's troops. She came from a family of architects and city developers who were noted for creating such works as the first drinking water system of Yerevan, the first hospital of the city, as well as other landmarks. Her father, Tigran Ter-Avetikian and his brother, Yervand, created the Philharmonic Hall of Yerevan, the City Council building on Shahumyan Square, and other noted works.

After completing her high school studies, in 1924, Ter-Avetikian enrolled in the Technical School of Yerevan State University (YSU) to study architecture. In 1926, simultaneously with her studies, she started working for Nikoghayos Buniatian and Alexander Tamanian, noted architects who designed the master plan of the city of Yerevan and many of its buildings. Her schedule at this time was to go to school in the mornings, in the afternoon work in Buniatian's workshop, and then work with Tamanian in the evenings. Ter-Avetikian graduated in 1930 and shortly thereafter, married fellow architect, Konstantin Hovhannisian, who had attended YSU and was also employed with Buniatian and Tamanian.

== Career ==
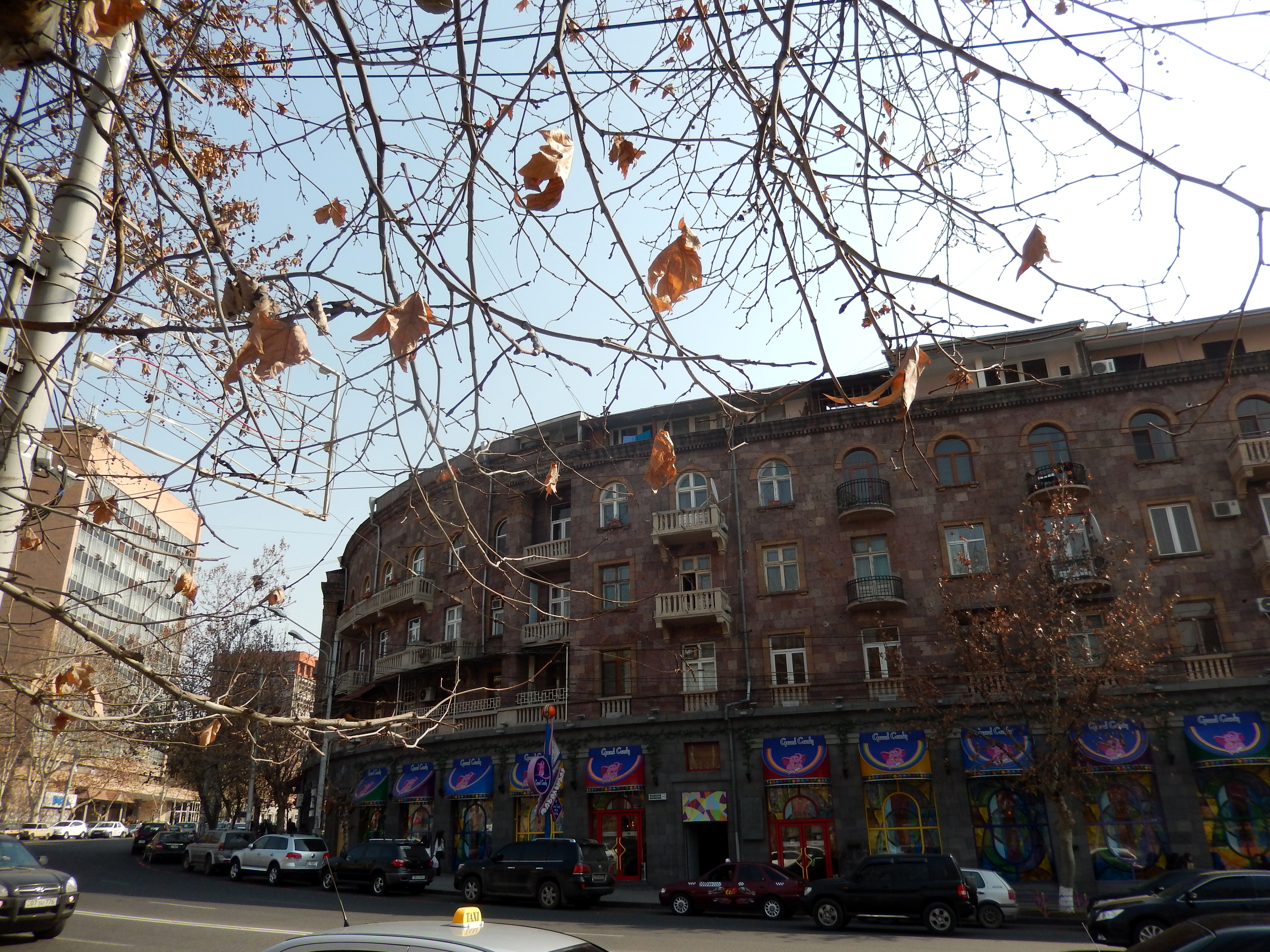
Ponchikanots building at the corner of Mashtots Avenue and Koryun Street

Together with her husband, Ter-Avetikian designed the fire and police stations in Yerevan and the "Sasuntsi Tavit" cinema, though the cinema was later destroyed. In 1938, one of her designs won recognition at the Parisian international exhibit of "Woman in art and folk art" and that same year, received the designation Laureate of the All-Union Review of the Technical Creativity of Women Architects (Russian: Лауреат Всесоюзных смотров творчества женщин-архитекторов). Between 1941 and 1943, she served as the Chair of the Armenian Union of Architects. Her design for the filmmaker's building won the first prize in the 1948 All-Soviet Female Architects' Competition. The building, often known as Ponchikanots building, because it housed one of Yerevan's first cafés, which served ponchiks, a kind of pastry.

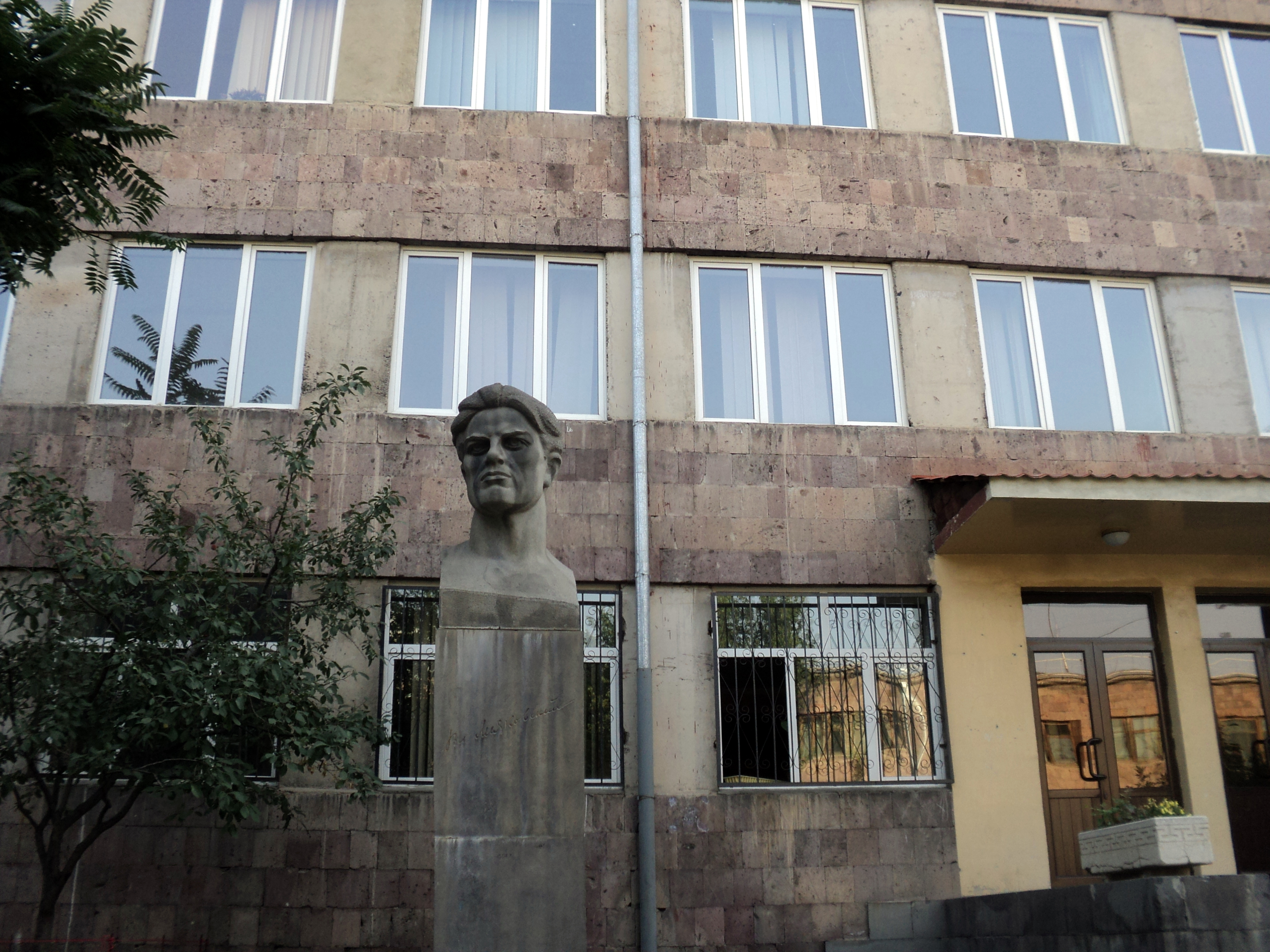
Vladimir Mayakovsky's school No. 7, Yerevan designed by Ter-Avetikian

Throughout her career, Ter-Avetikian, who later went to work with another design firm, built residential and office buildings, as well as schools and hospitals. Among some of her designs are the Armenfilm film studio on the corner of Lenin Avenue and Kirov Streets in Yerevan; the Ministry of Trade building; the NKVD building at Abovyan and Kirov Streets in Yerevan; the R. Acharyan Institute of Language in Yerevan; schools in Echmiadzin, Kirovakan, Leninakan, Stepanavan, and Yerevan; a hospital in Nor Bayazet. Her designs were known for their classic composition and decorative elements, but with the decidedly nationalist features of Armenian architecture. She gained a reputation for corner structures and her ability to design in harmony with the surrounding spaces, utilizing such elements as concave arcades to offset the straight lines of a street.

In 1945 Ter-Avetikian was recognized by the Supreme Soviet of the Armenian Soviet Socialist Republic and in 1956, she was again designated as a Laureate of the All-Union Review. In 1968, Ter-Avetikian became an architect emeritus and she retired in 1972. After Armenia gained its independence from the Soviet Union, Ter-Avetikian was recognized by the Republic of Armenia, receiving the Alexander Tamanian Gold Medal in 2002. In 2008, she received the Gold Medal of Yerevan, from the city, on the event of her 100th birthday. She was the subject of a featured article in the magazine Architecture, Construction (Архитектура, строительство) in 2012, in which she and her work were compared to the noted Brazilian centenarian and architect Oscar Niemeyer.

== Death and legacy ==
Ter-Avetikian died on 16 January 2013 in Yerevan, Armenia. She designed over forty buildings throughout Armenia, including the landmark Ponchikanots building.

== See also ==
- Tamar Tumanyan
