= Maxim Atayants =

Russian architect and restorer

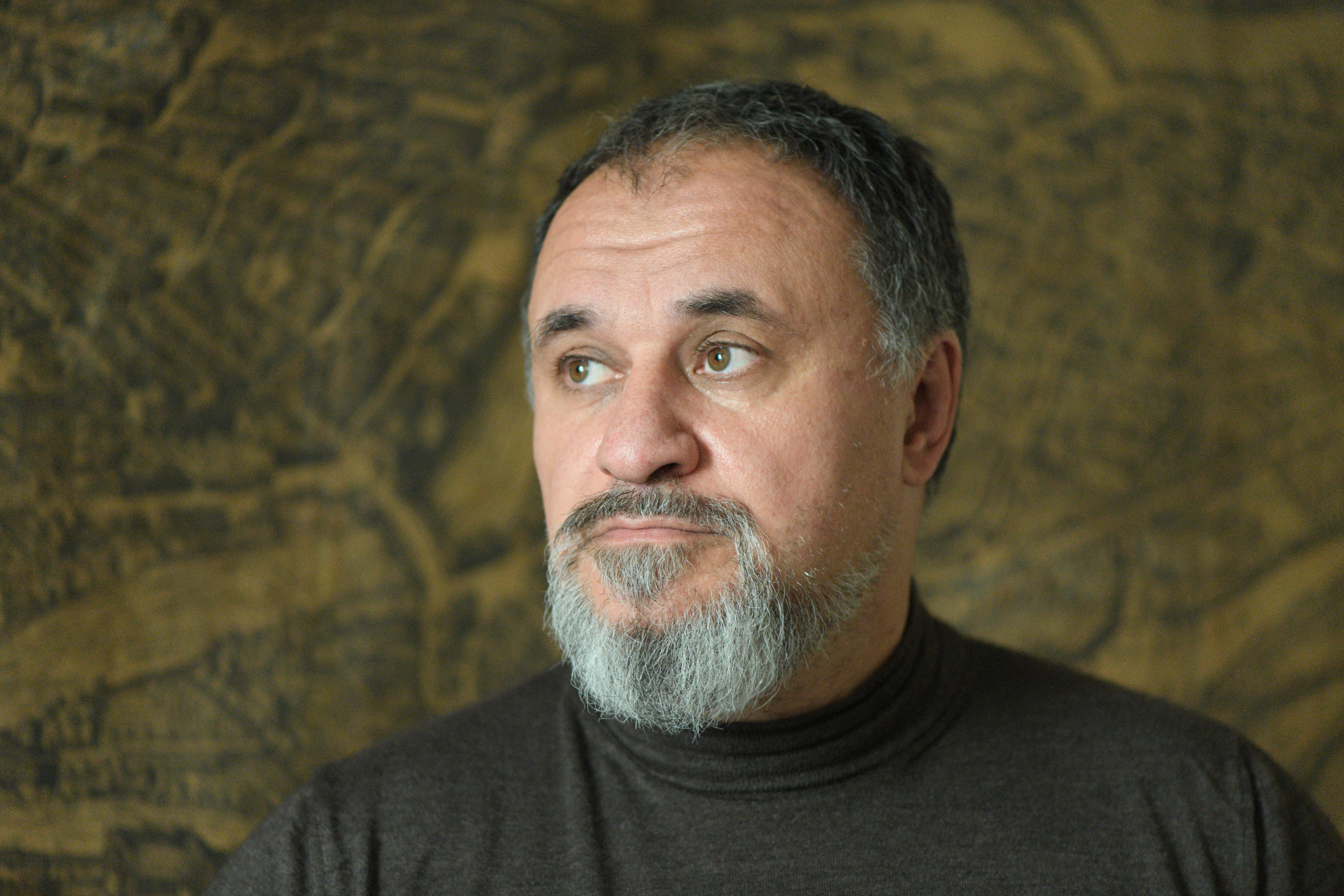
- Born: 1 October 1966 (age 59); Ryazan, Russia
- Education: Russian Academy of Fine Arts, Architectural Department
- Occupation: Architect
- Awards: Premio Europeo Cap Circeo, 2018 International Urban Design Award
- Buildings: St. John the Baptist church in Nagorno-Karabakh, St. Spirit Cathedral in St. Petersburg, Gorod Naberezhnikh
- Projects: Gorky Gorod in Sochi, Gorod Naberezhnikh Lesoberezhny, Laikovo
- Design: Buildings of Supreme Court of Russian Federation in St Petersburg. Memorial Church 100-years of Armenian genocide in Yerevan

Maxim Atayants (Rus. Максим Борисович Атаянц, Arm. Մաքսիմ Բորիսի Աթայանց; born 1 October 1966) is a Russian architect, artist, and professor of architectural history and design.

== Biography ==
Maxim Atayants was born on October 1, 1966, in the town of Ryazan to the family of an Armenian radio engineer. His paternal ancestors came from the village of Karaglukh in the Hadrut Province of Nagorno-Karabakh, where they built a church dedicated to St. Mary.

Atayants moved to St. Petersburg in 1984 and entered the architectural department of the Russian Academy of Fine Arts, from which he graduated in 1995. His graduation thesis was titled "The Project of Design of the Navy Museum in Kronshtadt." In 1996, the project was displayed at the Vision of Europe exhibition in Bologna and was published in the exhibition catalogue.

In 1995, Atayants studied at the Prince Charles' Summer Architectural School organized by The Prince's Foundation for Building Community.

== Career ==
In 1996, he joined the St. Petersburg Department of the Union of Architects of Russia. By the end of the 1990s, Maxim Atayants had developed numerous projects for private houses and corporate interiors.

From 1998 to 2000, Atayants was teaching at the Sapienza University of Rome and the Rome department of the Notre Dame School of Architecture.

In 2000, he set up his studio – Maxim Atayants Architects (MAA) – specializing in large urban projects.

Since 1995, he has studied Ancient Greek and Roman architecture. From 2004 to 2010, he traveled through Middle East and Northern Africa, inspecting the remaining architectural heritage of the Roman Empire.

In 2021, he was elected as a corresponding member of the Russian Academy of Architecture and Construction Sciences.

== Main works ==
Maxim Atayants is regarded as a partisan of neoclassicism. This architectural school proclaims that the design of modern buildings could and should be created using the order system and other expressive means of classical architecture.

=== Graphic arts ===
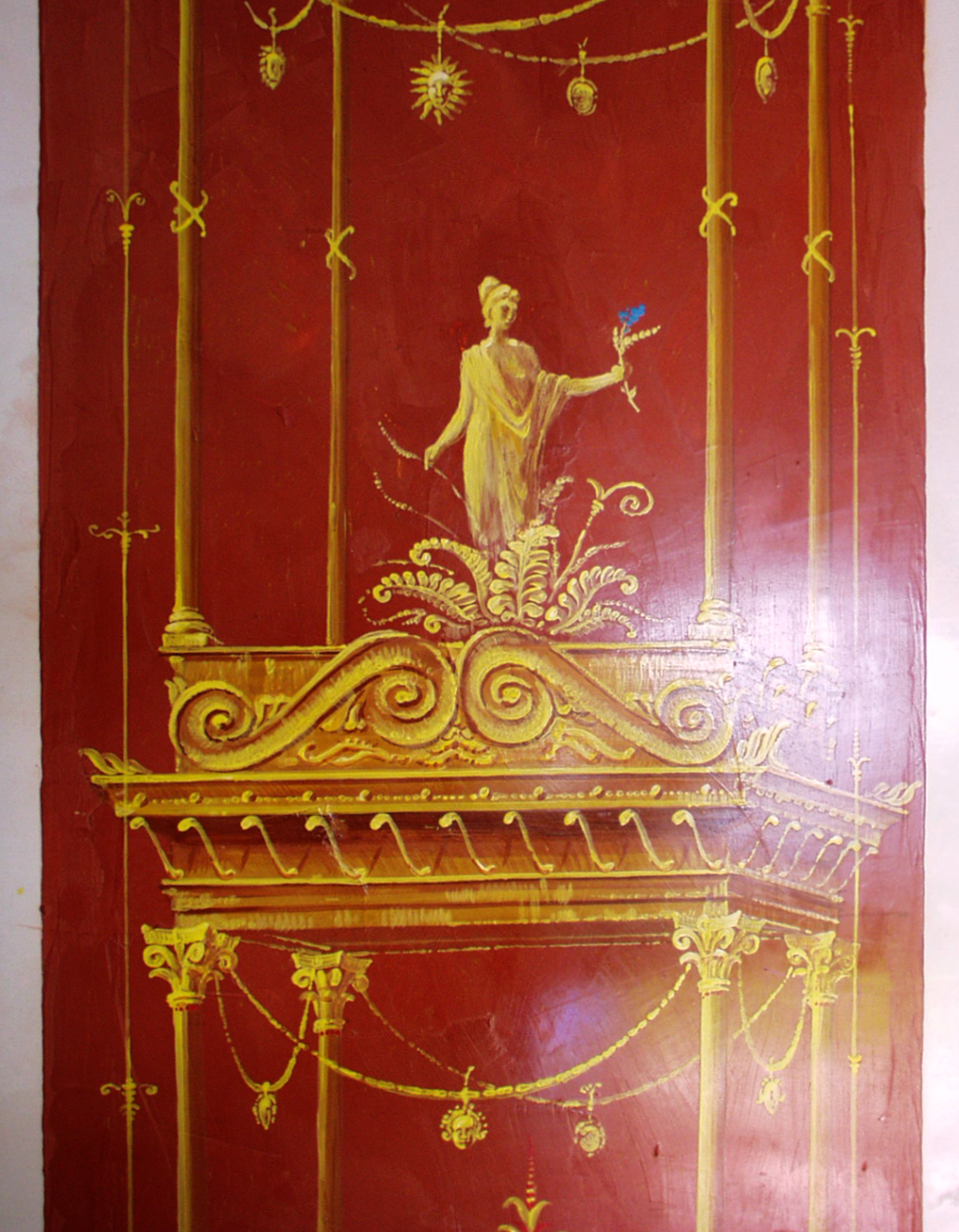
Private villa in Ticino, Switzerland. Fresco by Maxim Atayants

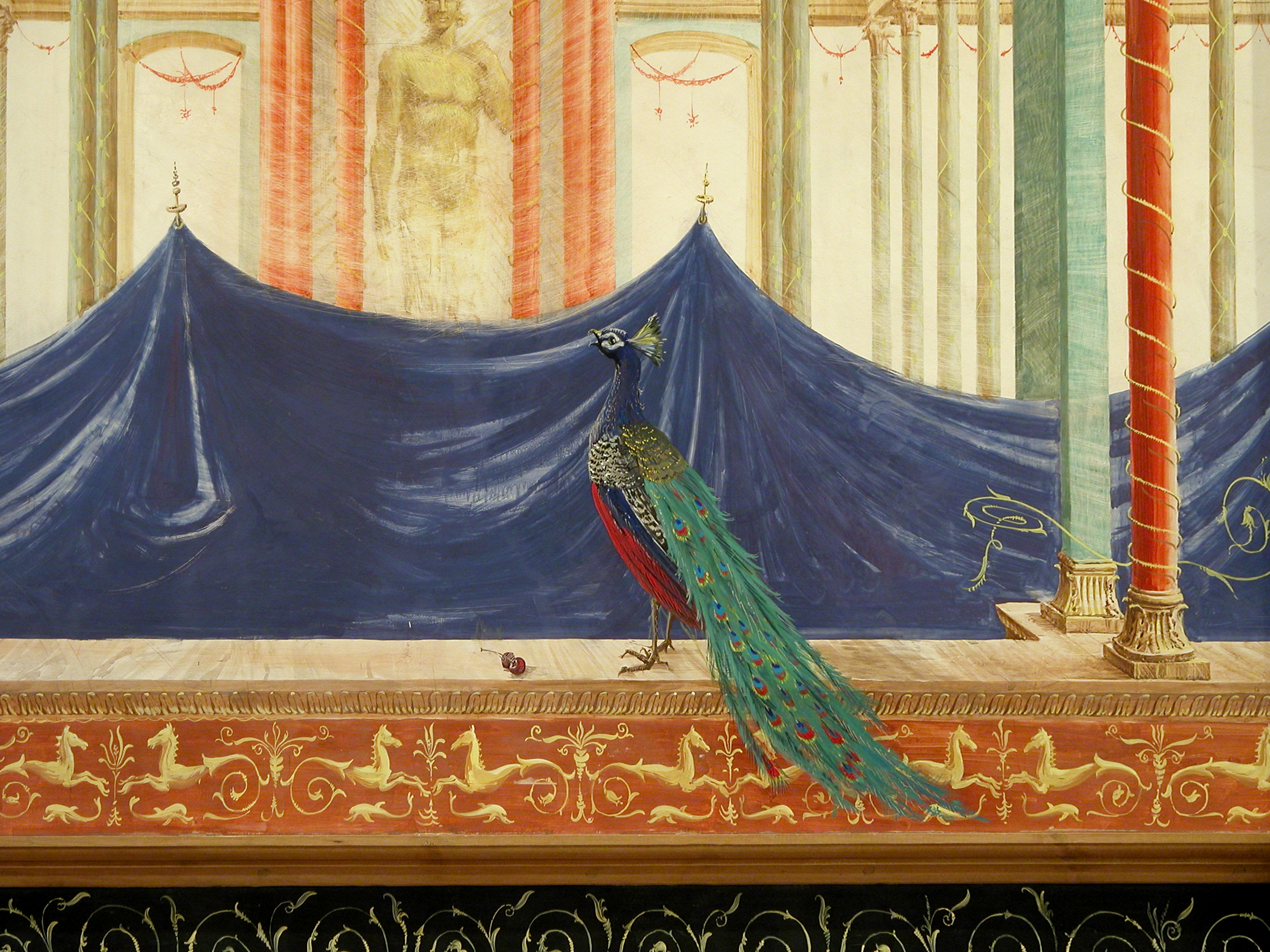
Beauty parlour "Caligula"- St. Peterburg --fresco by Atayants

As a graphic artist, Atayants created many works of architectural landscapes that portray:

- Armenian architecture
- Ancient Greece and Rome
- St. Petersburg

Some drawings depict restored versions of destroyed monuments – such as buildings of ancient Palmyra which were recently ruined.

2005 Syria. Palmyra. The Temple of Bel's Temenos

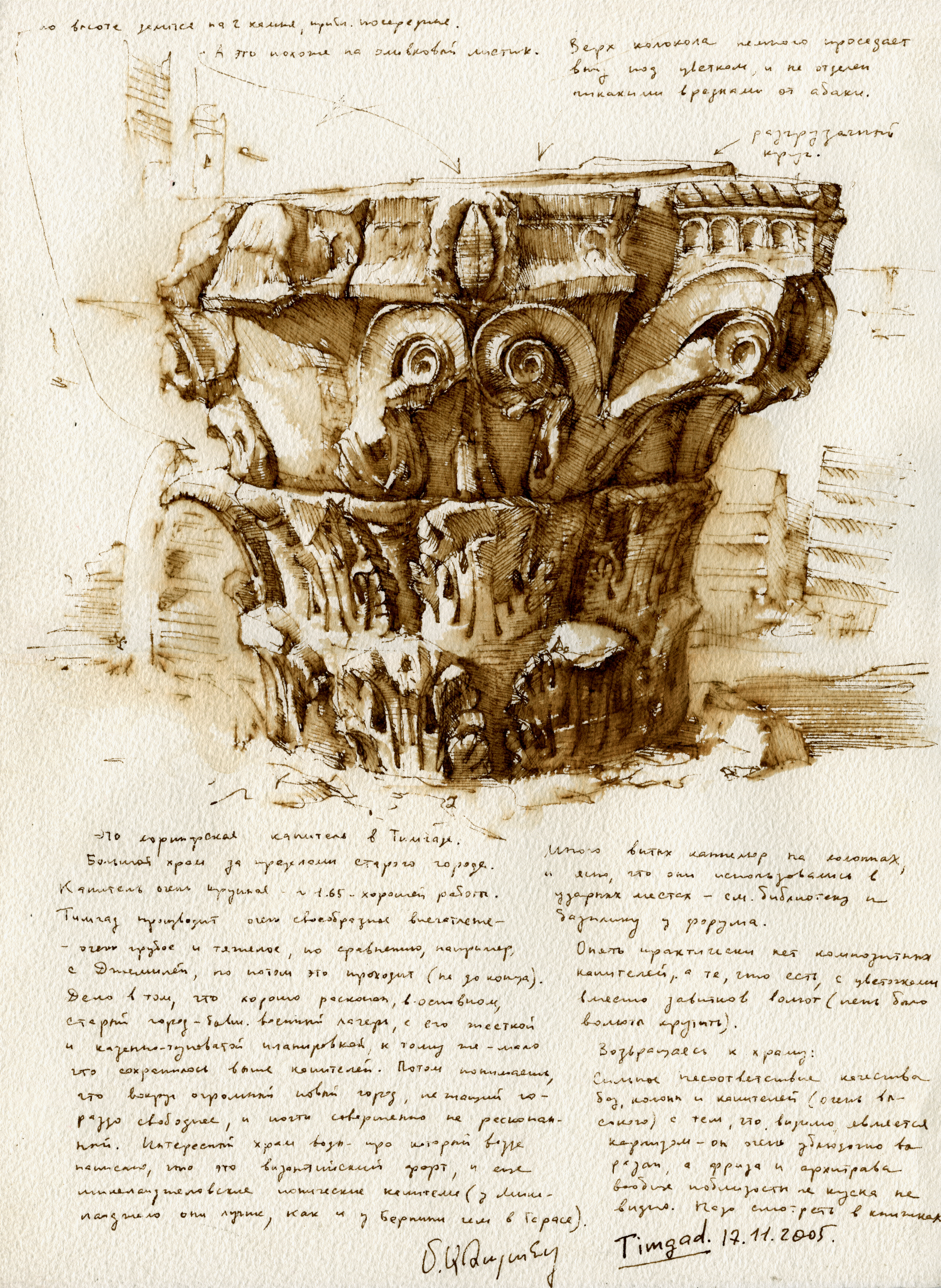
2005 Algeria. Timgad. Capital of Capitoline Temple

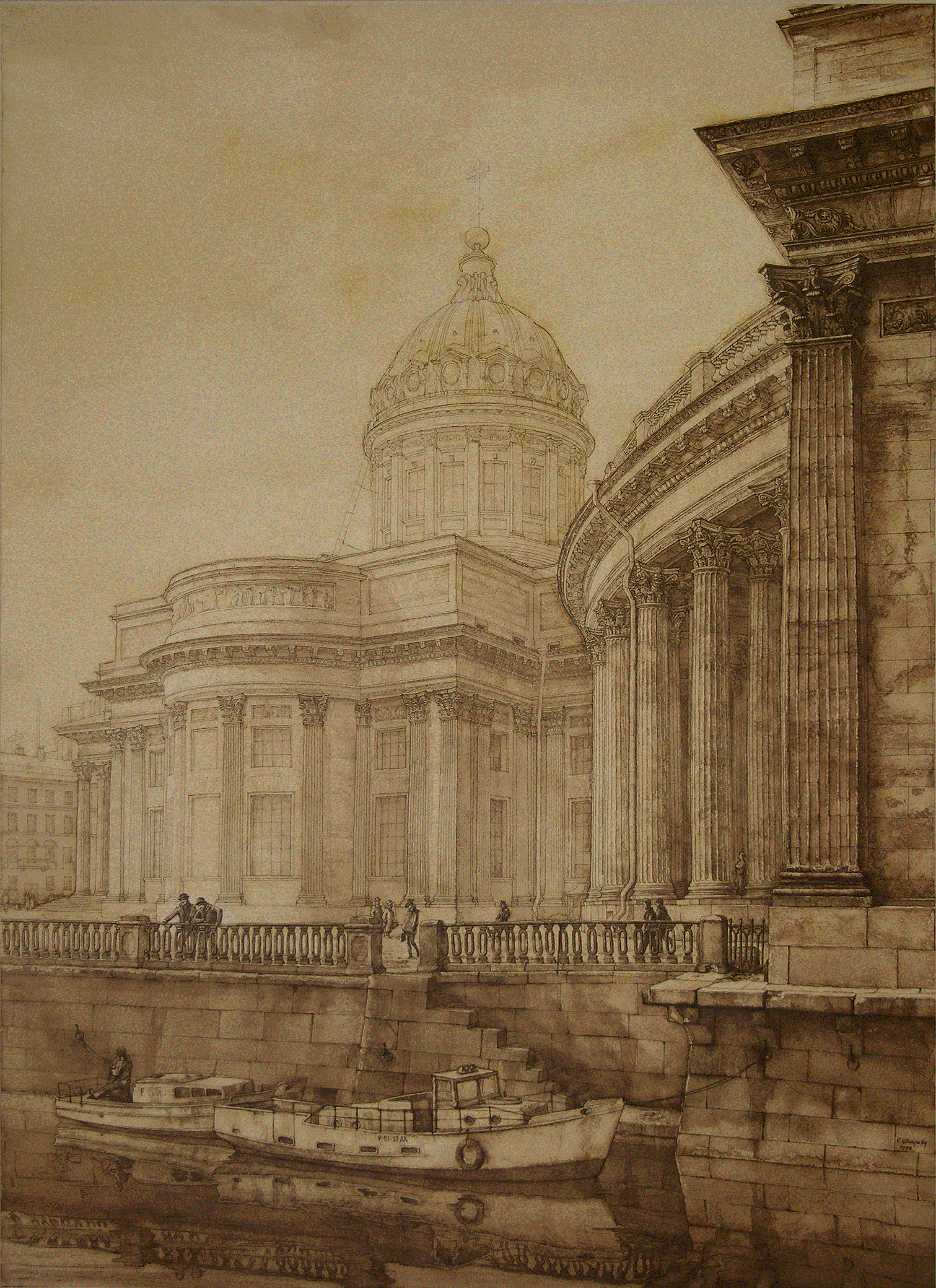
St. Petersburg. Kazan' Cathedral

Atayants' work is now included in collections of the State Hermitage, Shchusev Museum of Architecture, the Museum for Architectural Drawing, the Pushkin State Museum of Fine Arts in Moscow, Notre Dame School of Architecture, and the American School in Switzerland.

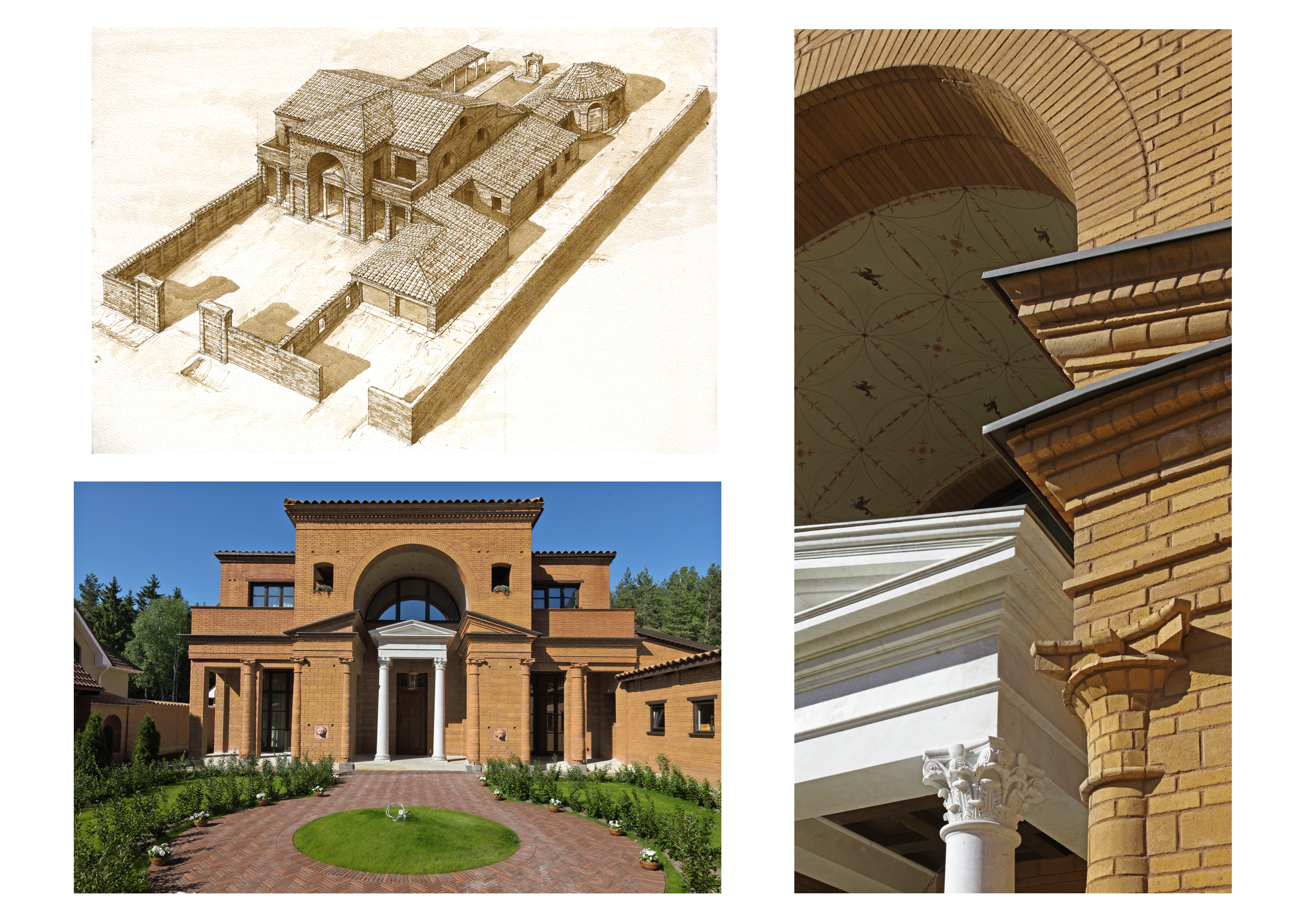
Private house in Lys'y Nos near St. Petersburg

=== Selected projects ===
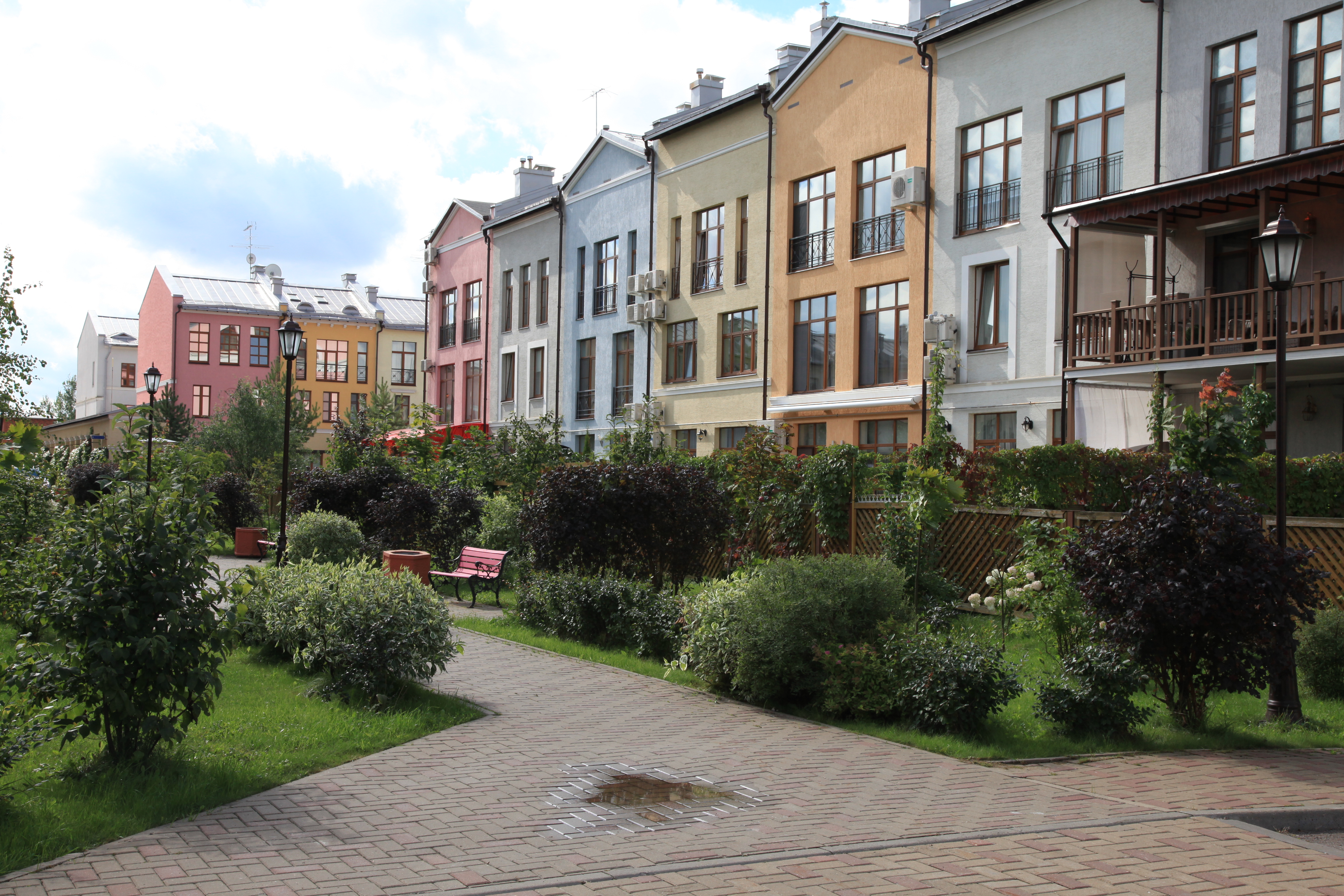
Residential district "Ivakino-Pokrovskoye"

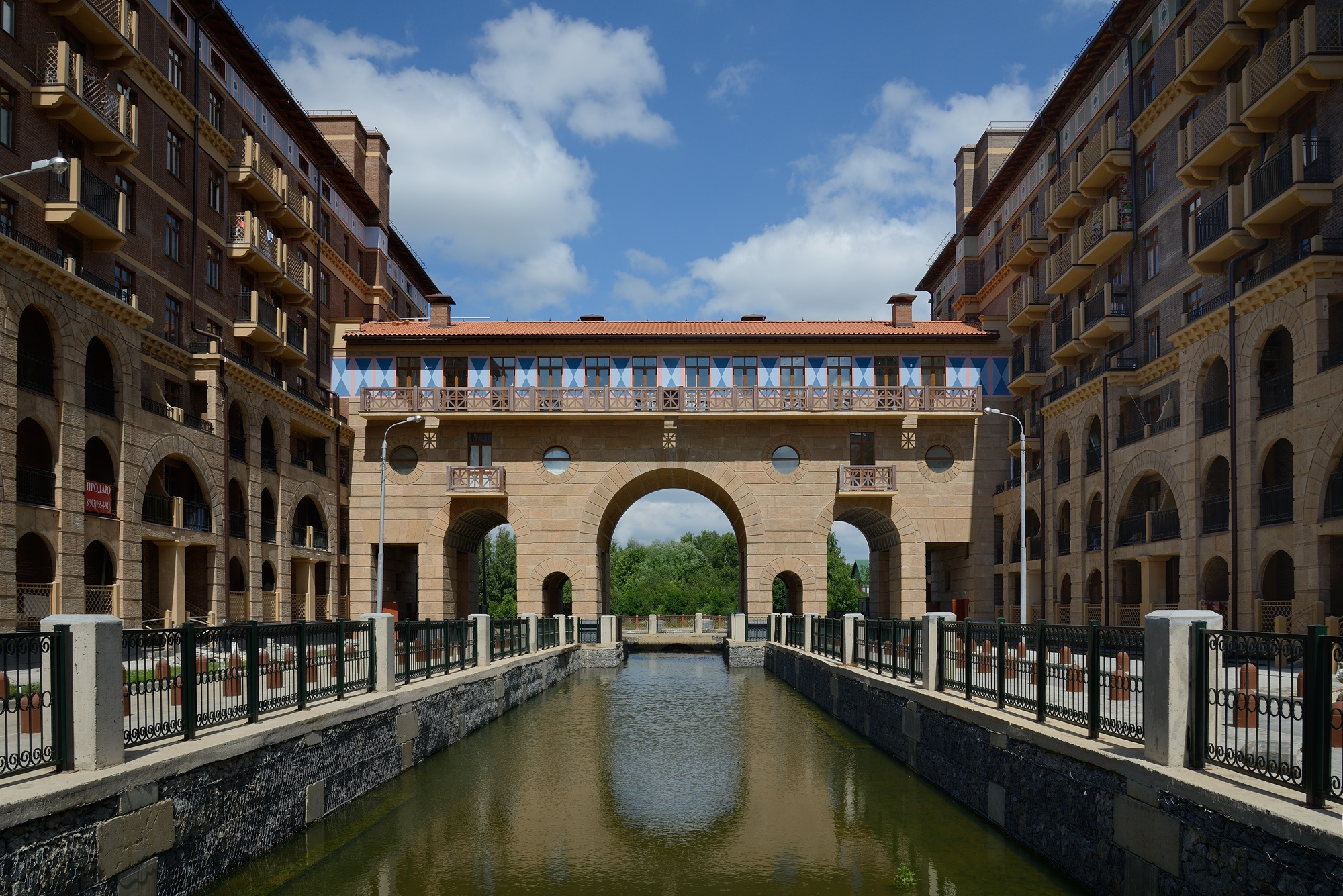
Residential district "Gorod Naberezhnikh" (Moscow region)

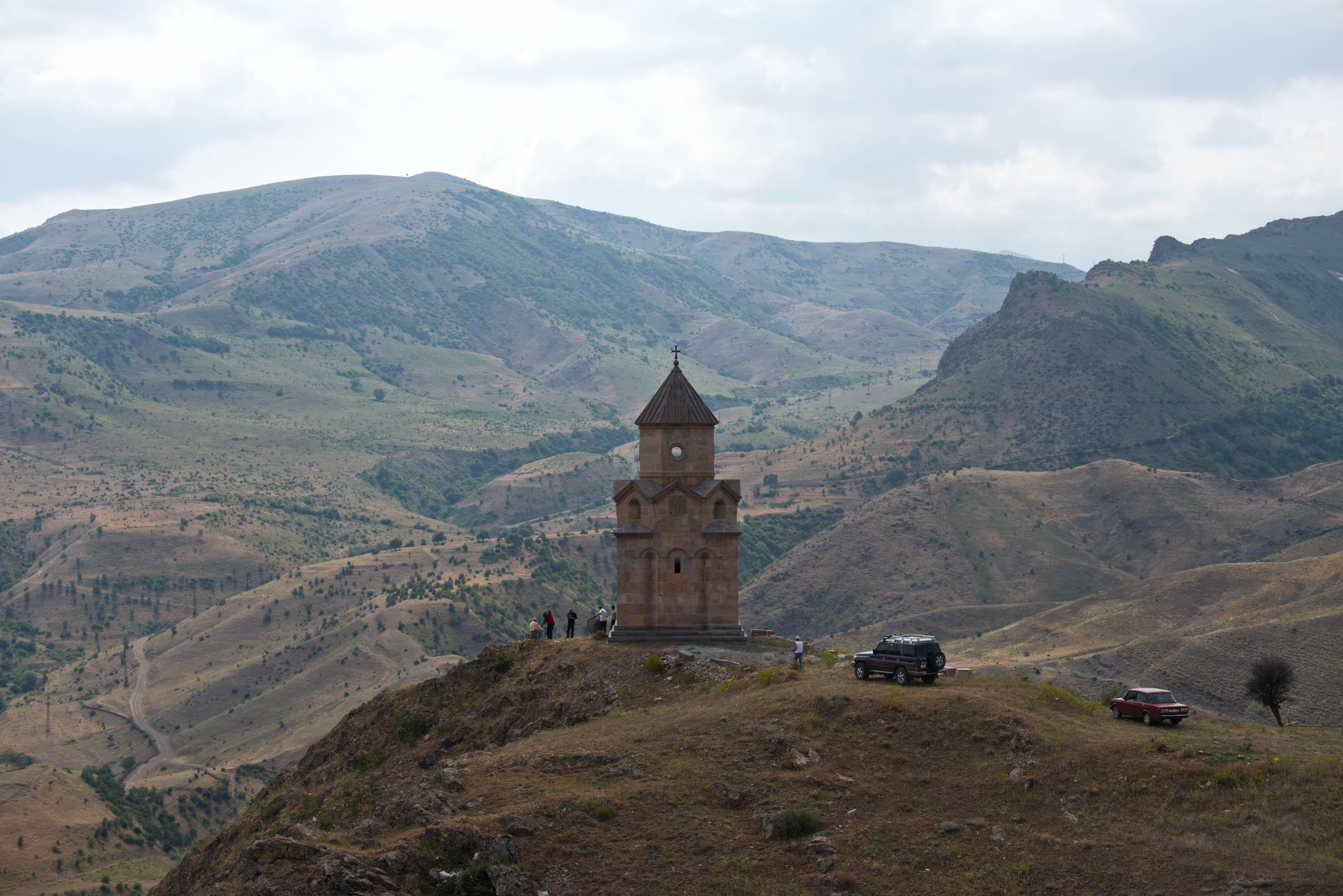
Village of Karaglukh in the Hadrut Province of Nagorno-Karabakh. John the Baptist church

- Cathedral of the Descent of the Holy Spirit in Saint-Petersburg (2012 – now) – under construction.
- St. John the Baptist church (Սուրբ Հովհաննես Մկրտիչ, Surb Hovanes Mkrtych) in Nagorno-Karabakh (2013) – built
- Ethnographic park "Moya Rossia" ("My Russia") in Sochi (2014) – built
- Mountain resort "Gorky Gorod" in Sochi (2014) – built

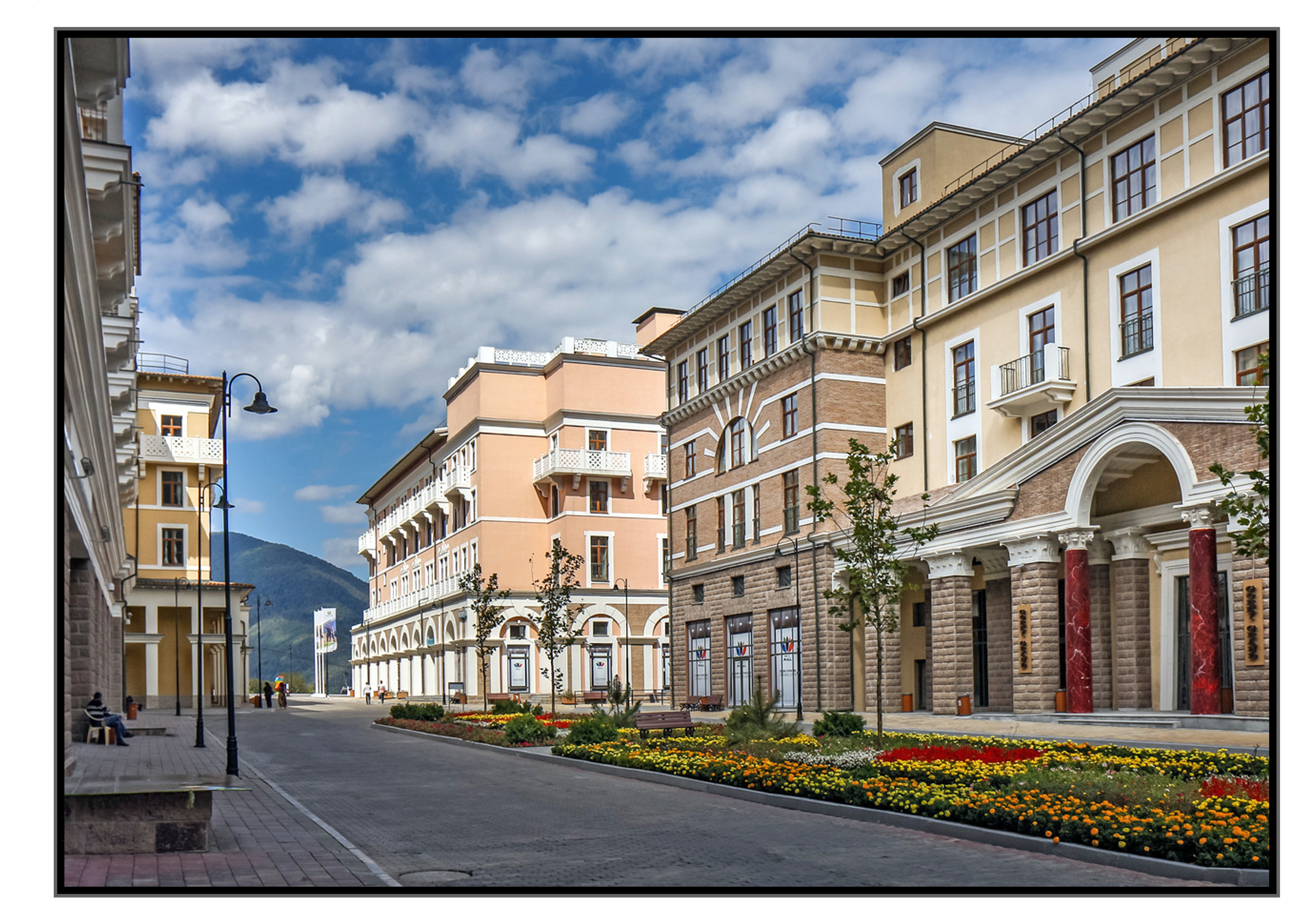
Mountain resort "Gorky Gorod" in Sochi (2014)

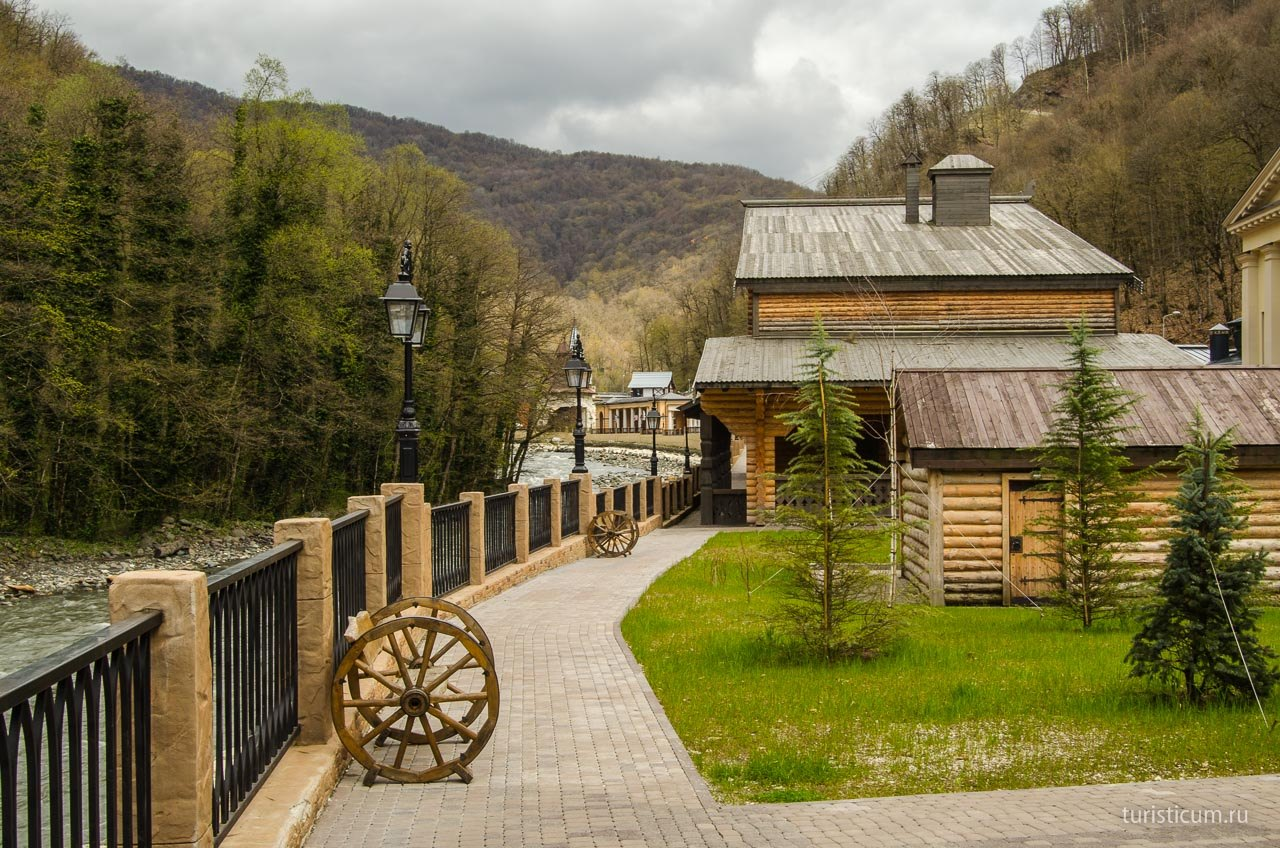
Ethnographic park "Moya Rossia"

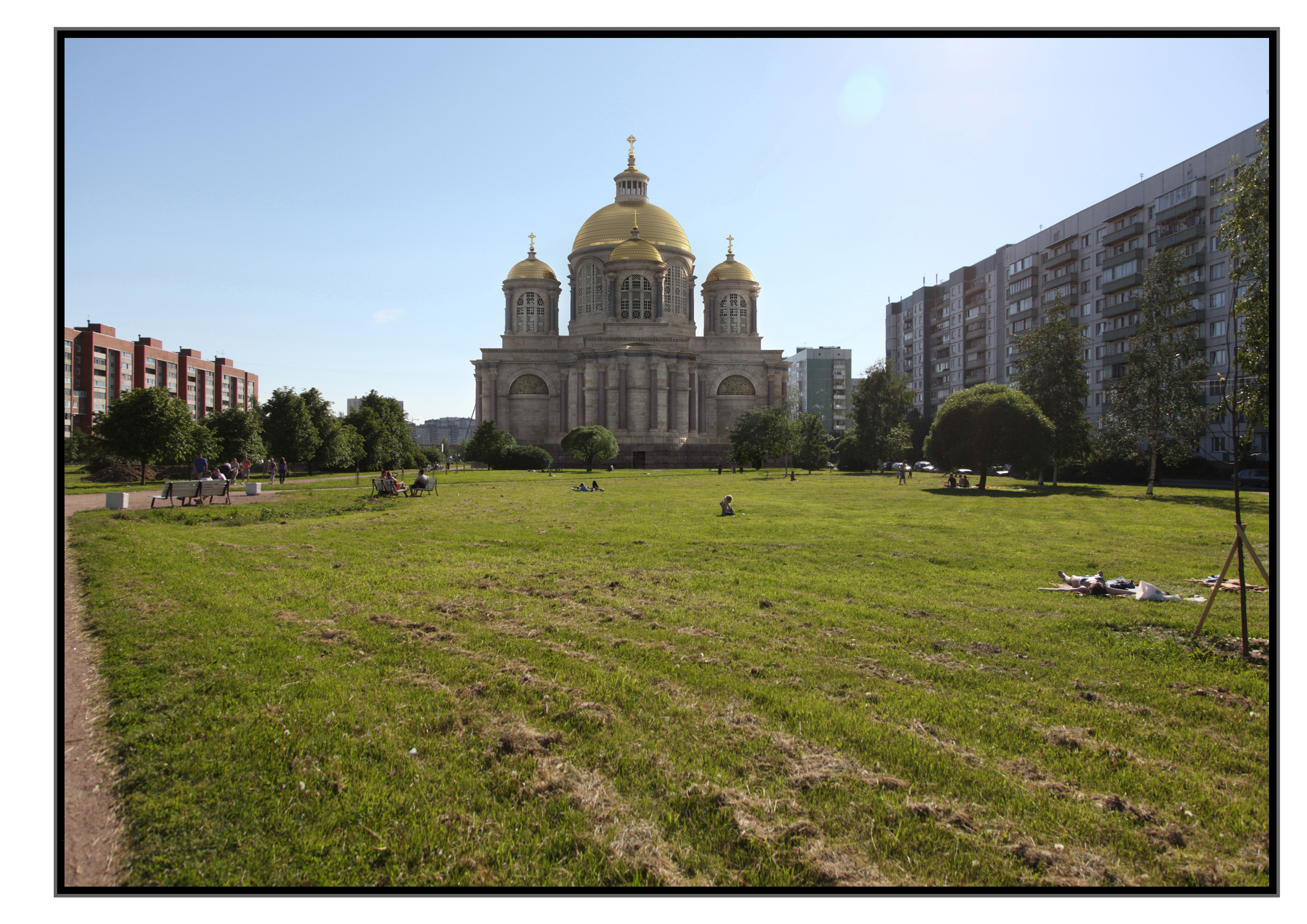
St. Spirit Cathedral in St. Petersburg. Project

- Residential district "Ivakino-Pokrovskoye" (Moscow region).
- Residential district "Gorod Naberezhnikh" (Moscow region).
- Restoration and renovation of the Novo-Tikhvinsky convent and St. Alexander Nevsky cathedral in Ekaterinburg.

==== Selected architectural competitions ====
- Buildings of Supreme Court of Russian Federation in St Petersburg (2014) – competition held by Administration of President of Russian Federation – winner, project was formally approved but rejected in fact.

== Academics ==
- Joint summer school in St. Petersburg of Russian Academy of Fine Arts (Architectural department) and Notre Dame School of Architecture, (1996).
- Sapienza Universita di Roma. Architectural department. Consultations of graduation theses, (1997—1998).
- Notre Dame School of Architecture Rome department. Guest lecturer at the seminar given by Professor Ettore Maria Mazzola and consultant of graduation theses. (From 1997 till now).
- Russian Academy of Fine Arts (Architectural department) (From 2000 till now.)
- Saint Petersburg Stieglitz State Academy of Art and Design Departments of Artistic Metal and Glass and Ceramics. The member of State Attestation Commission. (From 2009 till now.)

== Exhibitions ==
- "Vision of Europe", (Bologna, 1996) – graduation thesis "The Project of Design of the Navy Museum in Kronshtadt"
- III Moscow Biennale of Architecture, exhibition "Tendencies. Historicism" (2012) – inspirer and organizer of the joint exhibition of 7 Russian and 7 foreign architects of neoclassical school.
- "Nothing but Italy! Architectural graphics XVIII—XXI centuries", Moscow (2014) – The State Tretyakov Gallery, – 8 graphic works
- "Roman Time. Graphics of Maxim Atayants", Moscow (2016) – Pushkin State Museum of Fine Arts
- "Inspired by Greece", St.Petersburg (2016) – Russian Academy of Fine Arts

== Awards ==
- Awarded with honorary title of Merited Architect of Russia (3 May 2018).
- 2018 International Urban Design Award – or his outstanding designs for New Classical Urban Neighborhoods in Moscow, and Sochi Ski Village.
- 2016 Premio Europeo Cap Circeo Category: «Architecture and Art» — For artistic and architectural artefacts based on canons of Ancient Roman culture.

== Recovery of the village of Karaglukh ==
In early 1991, the village of Karaglukh was destroyed during Operation Ring. The village cemetery was defiled and defaced, and the memorial spring dedicated to the village residents who died in World War II was destroyed. All buildings and village infrastructure were in ruins and the village was abandoned.

In 2011, Atayants decided to build a church next to the village and dedicate his efforts to rebuilding the village. By 2018, the John the Baptist Church was built and consecrated, and the St. Mary church was restored. The memorial spring was repaired, and utilities such as water and electricity were established. Three residential buildings have been built, with two other residential buildings under construction. An agricultural processing plant is also being built to source produce from local farmers.
