= List of professional architecture organizations =

This is a list of professional architecture organizations listed by country. Many of them are members of the International Union of Architects.

== Africa ==
=== Ghana ===
- Ghana Institute of Architects

=== Kenya ===
- Architectural Association of Kenya

=== Nigeria ===
- Nigerian Institute of Architects

=== South Africa ===
- South Africa Institute of Architects

== Asia ==
=== Bangladesh ===
- Institute of Architects Bangladesh

=== Hong Kong ===
- Hong Kong Institute of Architects (HKIA)

=== India ===
- Indian Institute of Architects (IIA)

=== Japan ===
- Architectural Institute of Japan (AIJ)
- Japan Institute of Architects (JIA)

=== Pakistan ===
- Institute of Architects Pakistan

=== Philippines ===
- United Architects of the Philippines

== Europe ==
=== Armenia ===
- Armenian Union of Architects

=== Latvia ===
The Latvian Association of Architects (LAS)

=== Denmark ===
- Danish Association of Architects (Akademisk Arkitektforening) (AA)

=== Finland ===
- Suomen Arkkitehtiliitto SAFA

=== Germany ===
- Bund Deutscher Architekten

=== Greece ===
- Technical Chamber of Greece

=== Ireland ===
- The Royal Institute of the Architects of Ireland

=== Netherlands ===
- Netherlands Architecture Institute

=== Poland ===
- Association of Polish Architects

=== Spain ===
- Consejo Superior de los Colegios de Arquitectos de España

=== United Kingdom ===
- Royal Institute of British Architects (RIBA)
- Chartered Institute of Architectural Technologists (CIAT)
- Royal Incorporation of Architects in Scotland (RIAS)
- Royal Society of Architects in Wales (RSAW)
- Royal Society of Ulster Architects (RSUA)
- North Wales Society of Architects (NWSA)

== North America ==
=== Canada ===
- Royal Architectural Institute of Canada
- Architectural Institute of British Columbia
- Ontario Association of Architects
- Ordre des architects du Quebec

=== United States ===
- The American Institute of Architects
- The Society of American Registered Architects

== Oceania ==
=== Australia ===
- Australian Institute of Architects

=== News Zealand ===
- New Zealand Institute of Architects
