= Alexander Rotinoff =

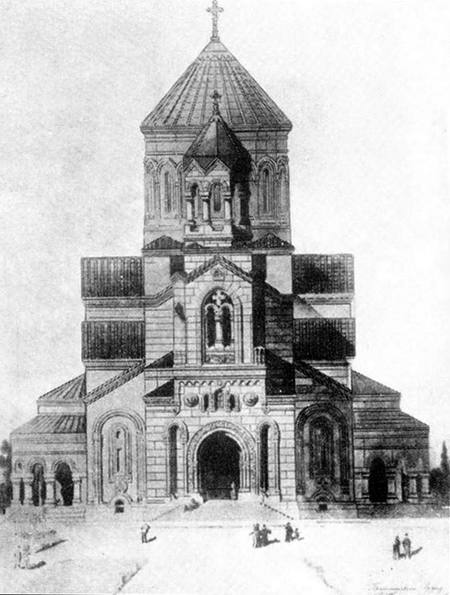
Saint Thaddeus and Bartholomew Armenian Church in Baku

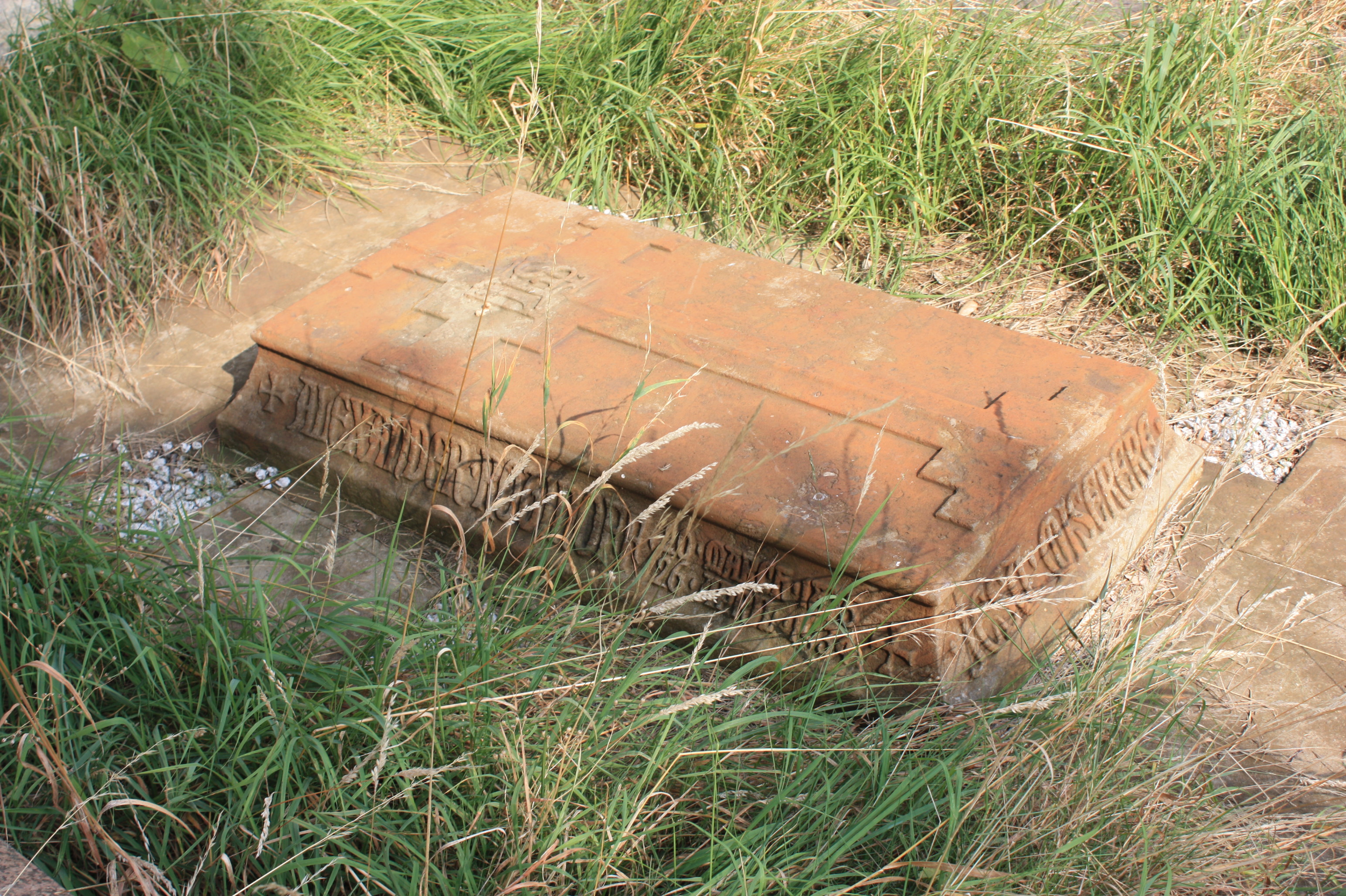
The grave of Alexander Rotinoff, Brompton Cemetery

Alexander Rotinoff (Armenian: Ալեքսանդր Ռոտինյան; Russian: Александр Ротинов, 20 March 1875 – 26 April 1934) was an architect and engineer of late 19th and early 20th century throughout the Caucasus. He was of Armenian descent.

Together with Gabriel Ter-Mikaelyan he applied to construct the Armenian church of Thadeus and Bartholomew in Baku in 1901.
