= Tamar Tumanyan =

Soviet Armenian architect (1907–1989)

- Թամար Թումանյան
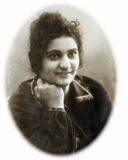
- Born: Tamar Hovhannesi Tumanyan; 1907; Tbilisi, Russian Empire
- Died: 1989 (aged 81–82); Yerevan, Armenian SSR, USSR
- Education: National Polytechnic University of Armenia, National University of Architecture and Construction of Armenia
- Occupation: Architect
- Father: Hovhannes Tumanyan

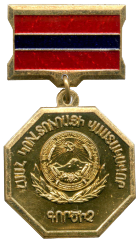
Badge of the "Honored Worker of Culture of the Armenian SSR"

Tamar Hovhannesi Tumanyan (1907–1989; Armenian: Թամար Թումանյան) was a Soviet Armenian architect. She was awarded the title Honored Worker of Culture of the Armenian SSR (1977). Her father was poet and writer Hovhannes Tumanyan.

== Biography ==
Tamar Tumanyan was born in 1907 in Tbilisi, Russian Empire to parents Olga Tumanyan and the noted poet Hovhannes Tumanyan. She was the youngest of 10 children in her family. Her siblings included Musegh (1889–1938), Ashkhen (1891–1968), Nvard (1892–1957), Artavazd (1894–1918), Hamlik (1896–1937), Anush (1898–1927), Arpik (1899–1981), Areg (1900–1939), and Seda (1905–1988). Tamar received her primary education at St. Gayane Girls' School in Tbilisi.

She attended Yerevan Polytechnic Institute (now the National Polytechnic University of Armenia); followed by study at the National University of Architecture and Construction of Armenia.

Starting in 1933, she worked as an architect in Alexander Tamanian's studio in Yerevan. It was at Tamanian's studio where she participated in the design of the Yerevan Opera Theatre (1939), and the Government House, Yerevan (1941). She later worked as an architect in Mark Grigorian's studio.

From 1945 to 1949 she was the secretary of the Union of Architects of Armenia. From 1947 to 1951 she was the chairman of the board of the Armenian Architectural Fund. From 1966 to 1989, she worked as the director of the Hovhannes Tumanyan Museum in Yerevan.

== Works ==
- Residential building of Kanaker HPP, Yerevan
- Residential building of factory #447, Yerevan
- Factory dormitory #447, Yerevan
- Building of the Meteorological Department, Yerevan
- Hotel in Sisian
- Yerevan Opera Theatre
- Government House, Yerevan

== See also ==
- Anna Ter-Avetikian
- Lori Province, area where her father's family had originated
