= Vartan Sarkisov =

Vartan Stepanovich Sarkisov Վարդան Սարգսյան
- Born: 8 March 1875; Shusha, Elisabethpol Governorate, Russian Empire
- Died: 29 March 1955 (aged 80); Baku, Azerbaijan SSR
- Occupations: Architect and Lecturer

Vartan Stepanovich Sarkisov (Sargsyan) (Armenian: Վարդան Սարգսյան; Russian: Вартан Степанович Саркисов; March 8, 1875, Shusha, Elisabethpol Governorate, Russian Empire – March 29, 1955, Baku, Azerbaijan SSR) was a Soviet architect of the first half of the twentieth century.

== Life ==
Of Armenian origin, Vartan Stepanovich Sarkisov attained his primary education at the local Shusha Realschule. Soon after graduation, he continued his education in Tbilisi where he studied at the Realschule and graduated in 1894 having honors. At the time of his study, he was started to paint skillfully. He also had an interest in opera music, which he preserved for all his life.

Having graduated Realschule in Tbilisi, Sargsyan moved to St. Petersburg and entered the St. Petersburg Institute of Civil Engineering. He was also a classmate of renowned architect Nikolai Bayev. After graduating from the university in 1901, he moved to Moscow to attain work experience. In 1907 he moved to Baku and immediately received requests for a series of projects. His architectural style was modern. Later on in his career, he switched to neoclassicism. In the 1920s, when the Construction Institute opened in Baku, Sarkisov was invited as a lecturer and occupied the post of dean for many years. Vartan Sarkisov died in Baku on March 29, 1955 and is buried in the Narimanov Cemetery. In September 2007, the local Azerbaijani government ordered to relocate the Narimanov Cemetery.

== Work ==
Vardan Sarkisov designed the Oil Producers Sanatorium building in Mardakan (1930), a male gymnasium, Residence on Krasnovodskaya street (1908; today Torgovaya (Nizami) Street and Samad Vurghun Avenue intersection; this building is also where Lev Landau was born), reconstructed the Ismailiyya building which was burned during the March Days in 1918, 7-floor apartment of the Baku Armenian millionaire Mirzabekov (Mirzabekyan) in Nikolayevskaya street (1908), and the Residence of Tigran Melikov (Khagani Street, 27).

== Buildings ==
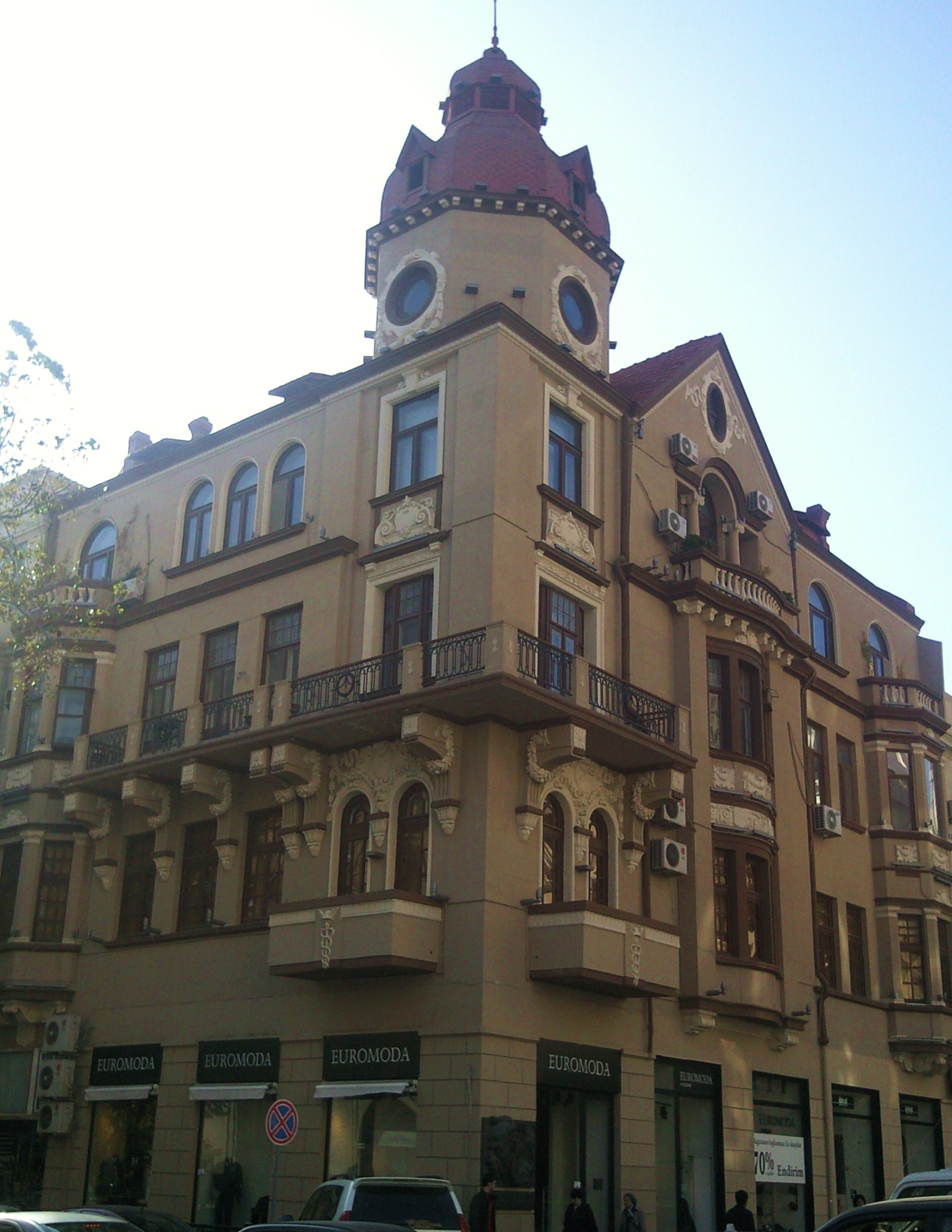
Residence on Krasnovodskaya street. Lev Landau lived in this house till 1924.

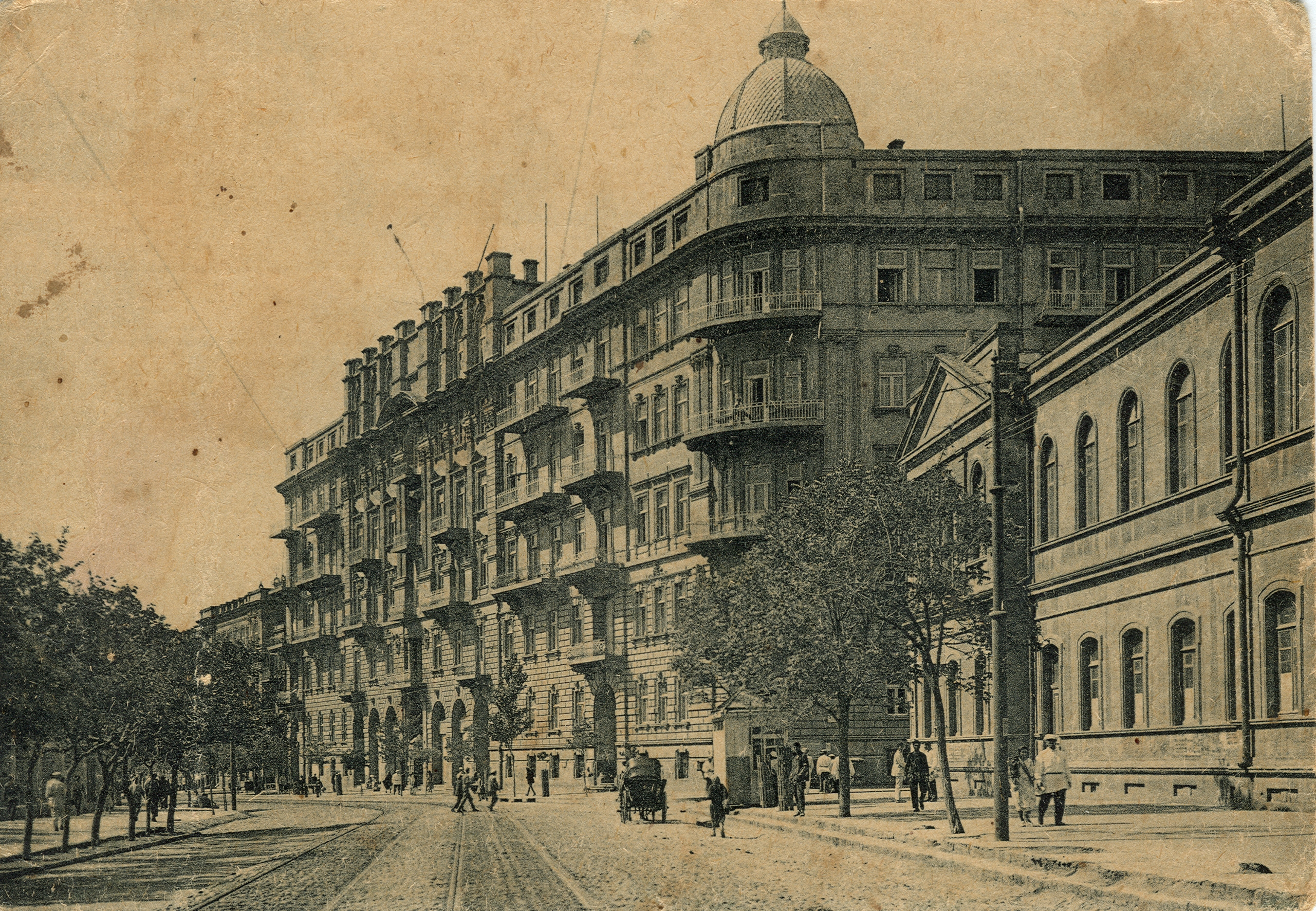
The house of Mirzabekov (Mirzabekyan) brothers on Nikolayevskaya street (today Istiglaliyyat Street)

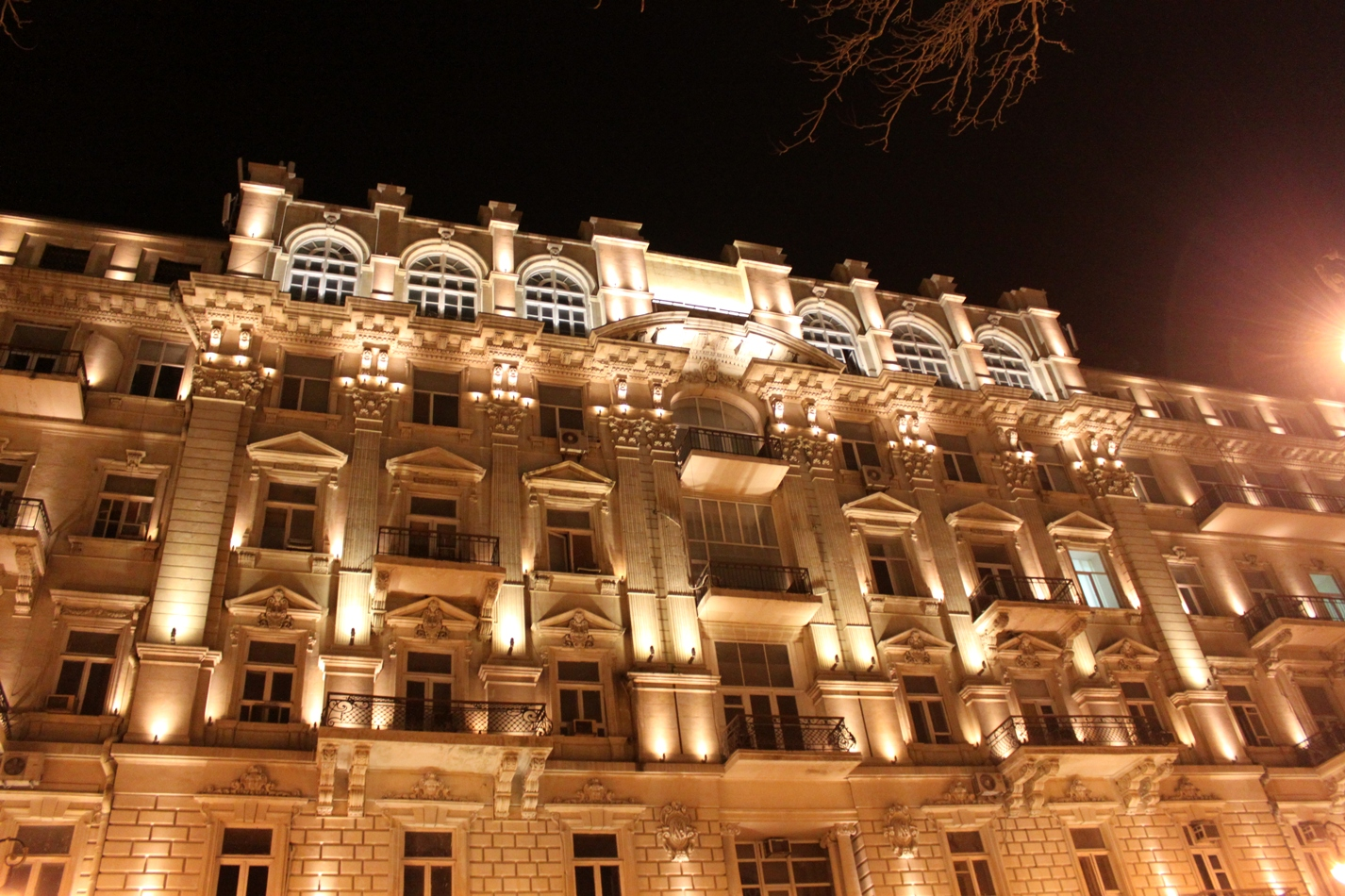
The house of Mirzabekov (Mirzabekyan) brothers at night.
