= Hovhannes Tumanyan Puppet Theatre of Yerevan =

Coordinates: 40°11′03″N 44°31′04″E

National Puppet theatre of Armenia after Hovhannes Tumanyan Puppet Theatre
- Հովհաննես Թումանյանի անվան Ազգային Տիկնիկային Թատրոն
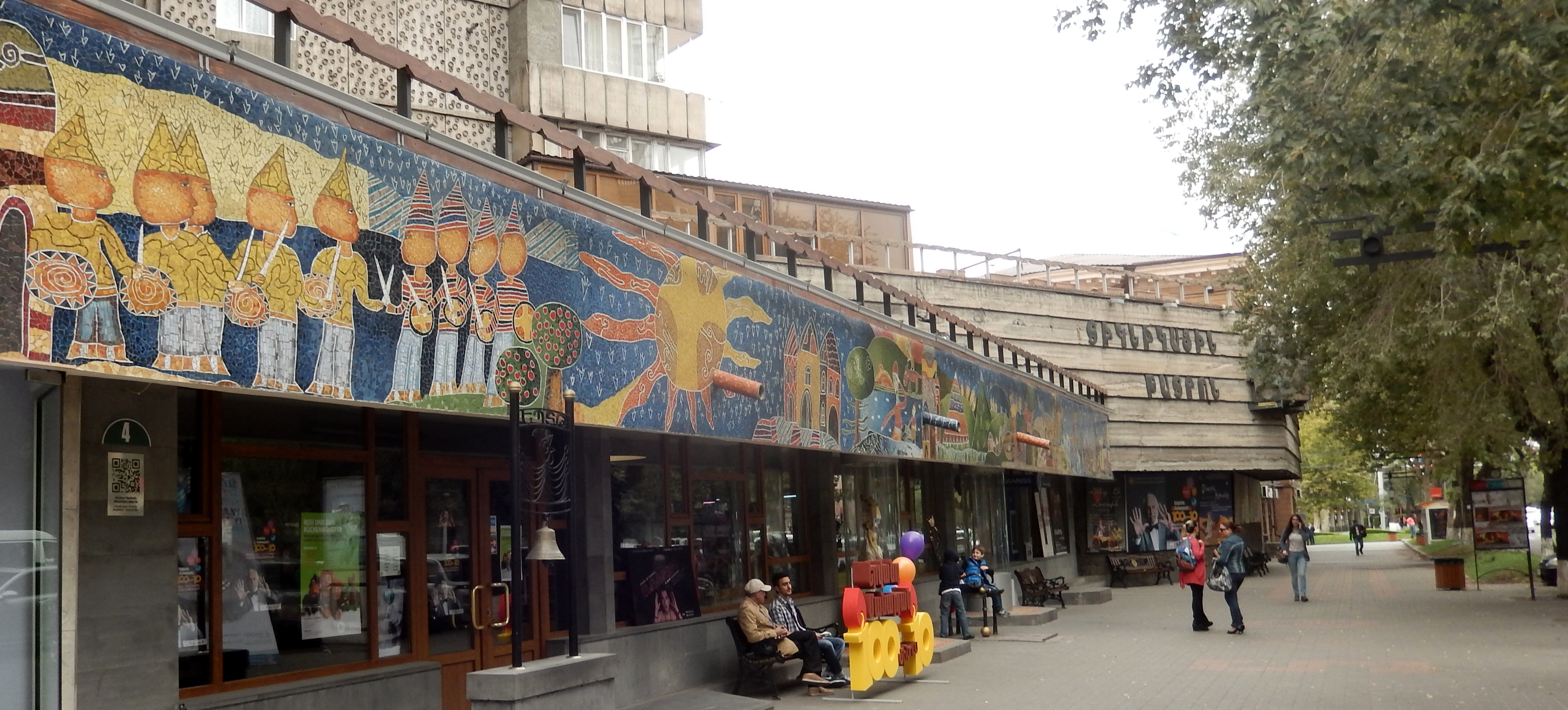
- Interactive map of National Puppet theatre of Armenia after Hovhannes Tumanyan Puppet Theatre
- Former names: Yerevan State Puppet Theatre named after Hovhannes Tumanyan
- Address: Sayat-Nova Avenue 4 Yerevan; Armenia
- Owner: Government of Armenia
- Type: Puppet theatre

Construction
- Opened: 1935

Website
- Official website

The Hovhannes Tumanyan Puppet Theatre of Yerevan, officially the National Puppet Theatre after Hovhannes Tumanyan (Armenian: Հովհաննես Թումանյանի անվան Ազգային Տիկնիկային Թատրոն [Yerevani Hovhannes T'umanyani anvan azgayin Tiknikayin T'atron]), is a puppet theatre founded in 1935 and located in Yerevan, Armenia. It is also the location of the Pavlos Boroyan Puppet Museum.

== History ==
The Hovhannes Tumanyan Puppet Theatre of Yerevan was opened on 1 June 1935 by Sofia Bejanyan, painter Gevorg Arakelyan, actors Pavlos Boroyan, and Araksia Arabyan. The first director of the theatre was Varia Stepanyan. In 1938, the theatre was renamed after Hovhannes Tumanyan.

Between 1950 and 1957 the theatre was closed. However, on 27 July 1957, the theatre was reopened and Yervand Manaryan became the director. Since 1975, the theatre is operating in its current location on Sayat-Nova Avenue. Between 1998 and 2022, the theatre was directed by Ruben Babayan, and since 2022, the theatre has been under the direction of Artashes Babayan.

The theatre is also home to a puppet museum, founded by and named after Pavlos Boroyan. It is the only puppet museum in Armenia.

Performances are generally aimed at children and famililes, however unlike other puppet theatres in Armenia, they do produce a number of shows aimed at adults.

The theatre is a member of UNIMA (Union Internationale de la Marionette - English: International Puppetry Union).
