= Sayat-Nova Avenue =

Street in Yerevan, Armenia

Coordinates: 40°11′01″N 44°31′07″E

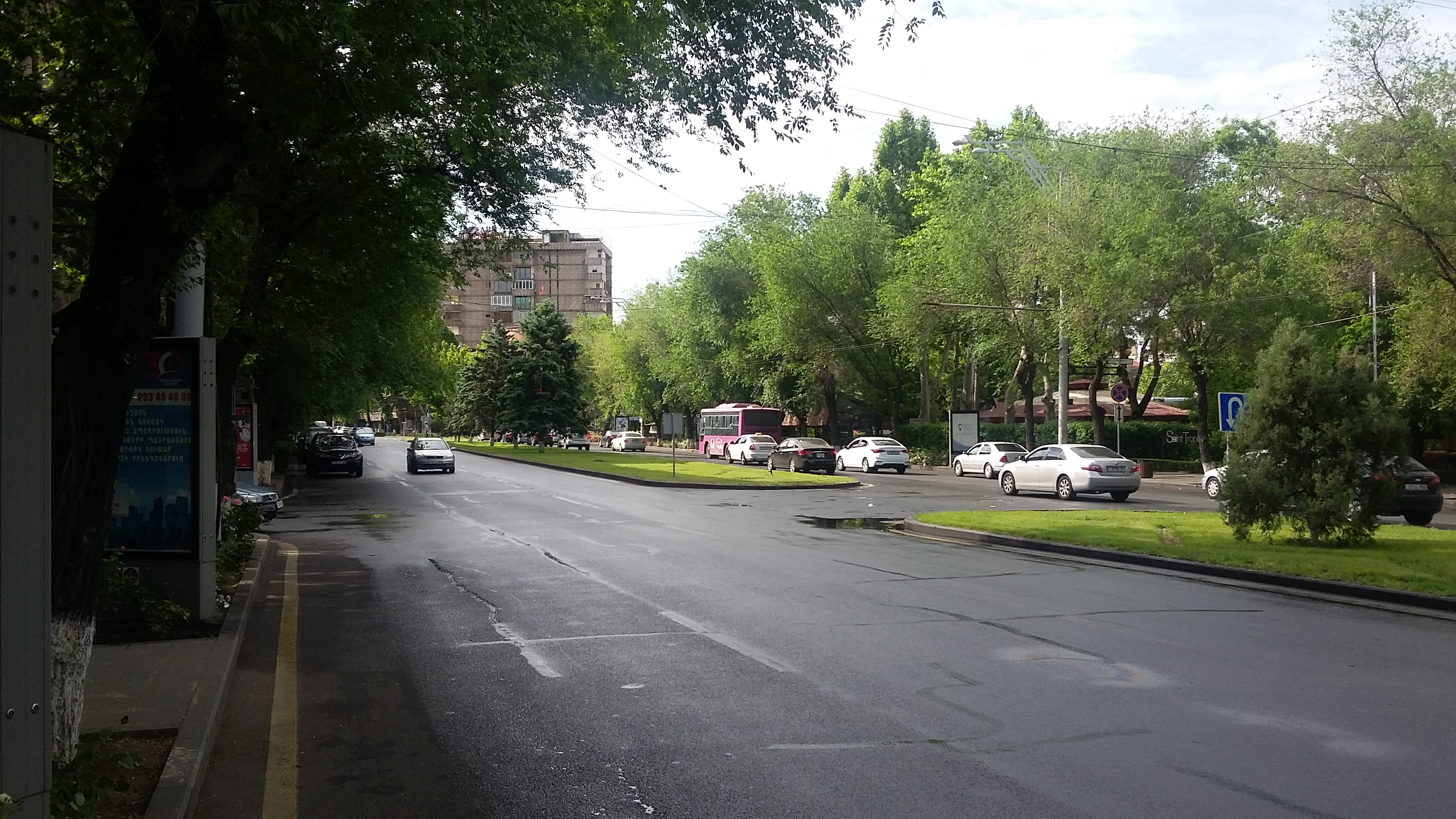
- Sayat-Nova Avenue
- Native name: Սայաթ-Նովայի պողոտա (Armenian)
- Length: 1.2 km (0.75 mi)
- Location: Kentron District, Yerevan Armenia

Construction
- Inauguration: 27 October 1963; 61 years ago

Sayat-Nova Avenue (Armenian: Սայաթ-Նովայի պողոտա Sayat-Nova'i Poghota), is an avenue in the central Kentron District of Yerevan, Armenia. It is named after the 18th-century Armenian poet and musician Sayat-Nova. It was officially inaugurated on 27 October 1963.

The avenue starts with the Marshal Baghramyan Avenue at the northwest and ends up with the Charents street to the southeast.

== Notable buildings ==
Many notable buildings in the city of Yerevan are located on the Sayat-Nova Avenue. Below is a list of the most attractive structures located on the avenue:

- Yerevan Komitas State Conservatory
- Ani Plaza Hotel
- Hovhannes Tumanyan Puppet Theatre of Yerevan

== Gallery ==
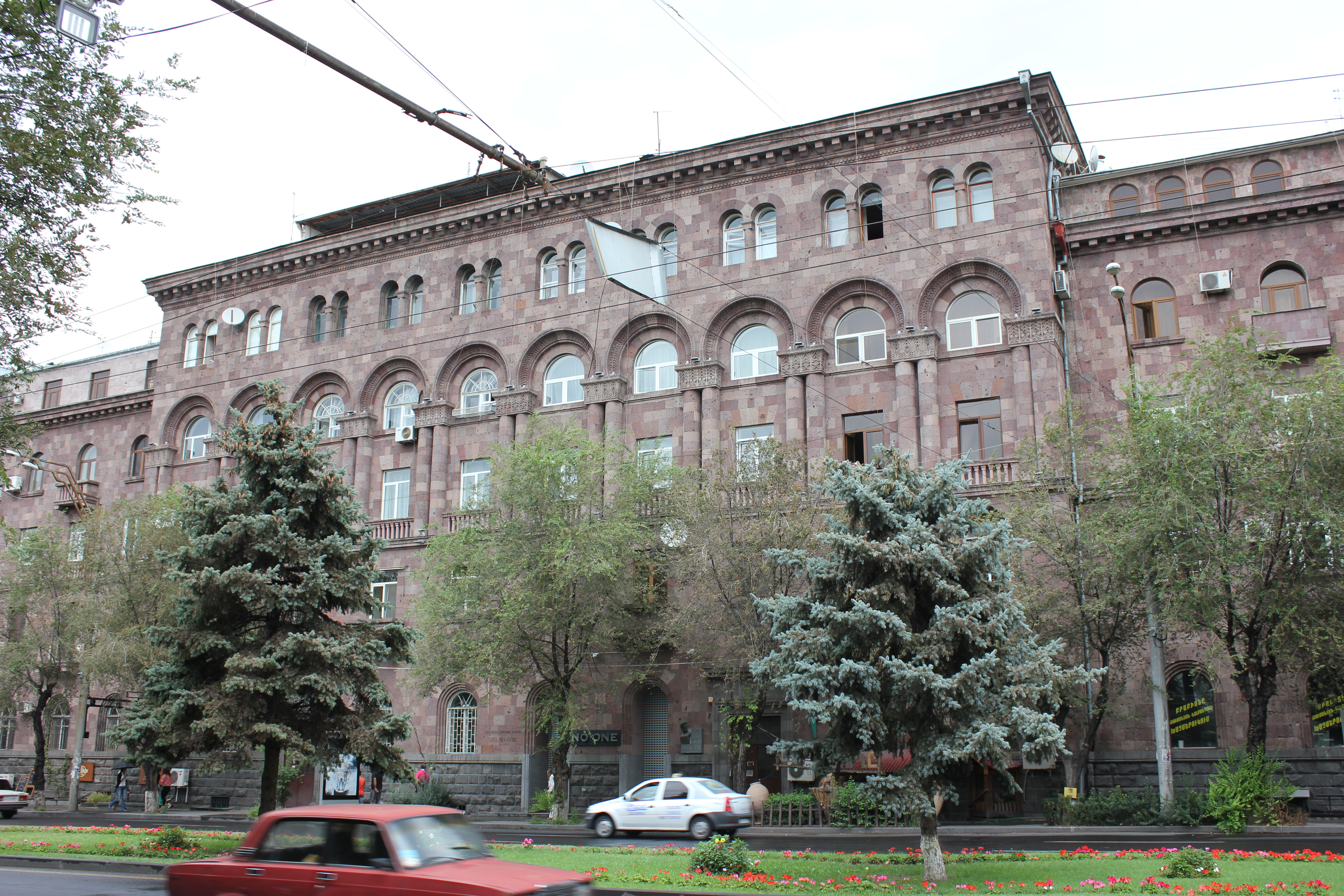
Residential building on the avenue

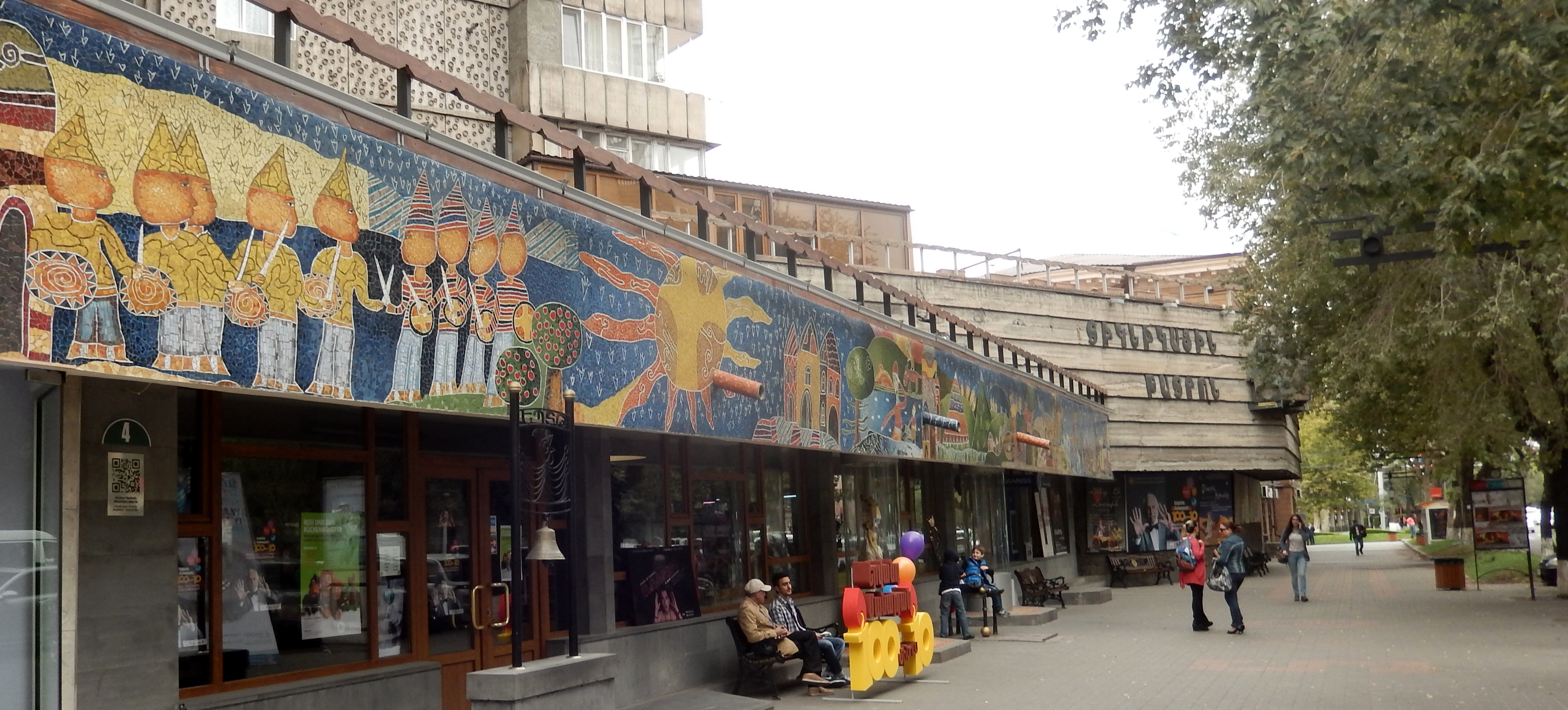
Hovhannes Tumanyan Puppet Theatre

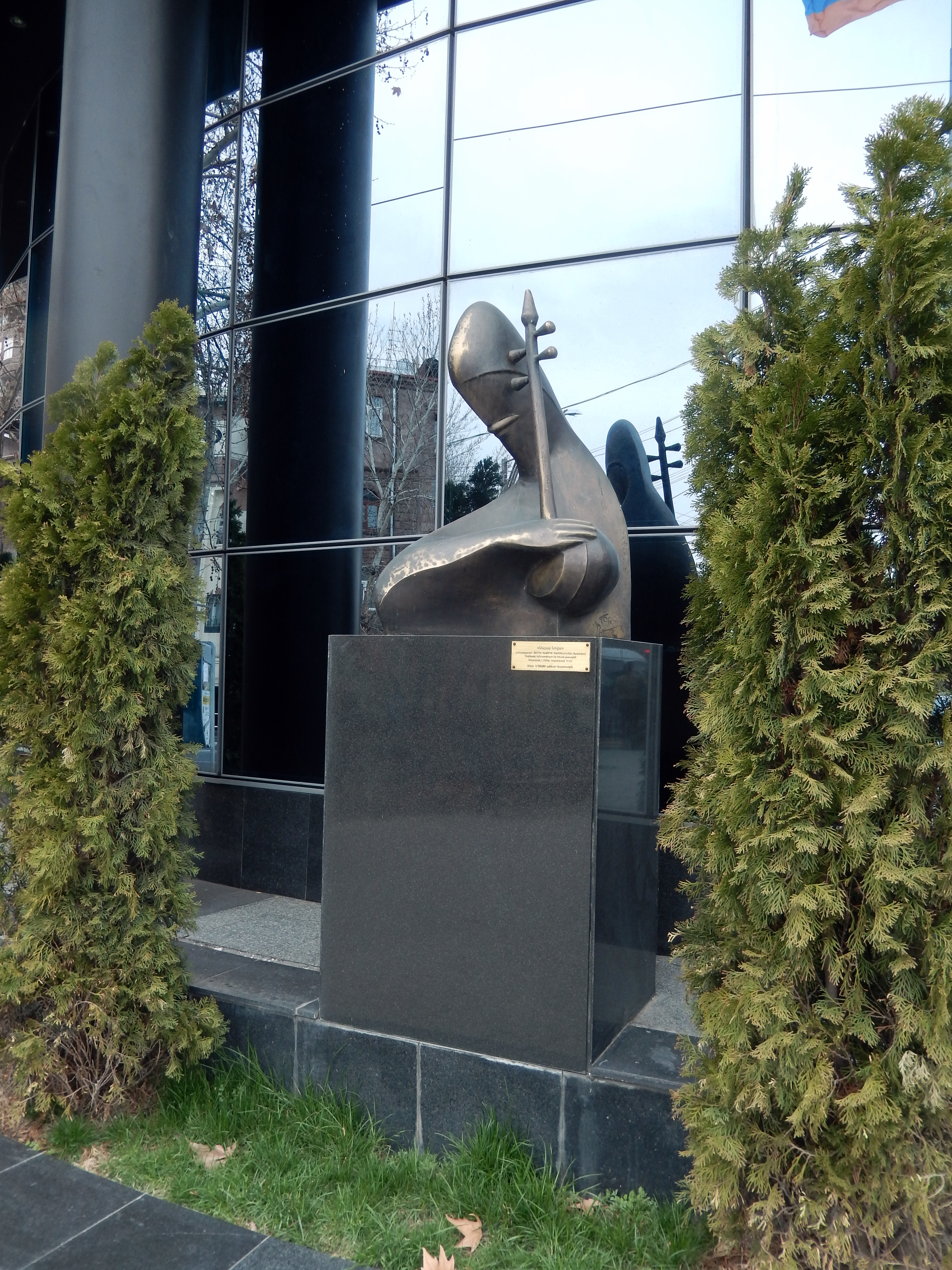
The statue of Sayat-Nova
