= Armenian Union of Architects =

Armenian Union of Architects logo

The Armenian Union of Architects (Armenian: Հայաստանի ճարտարապետների միություն, romanized: Hayastani chartarapetneri miut’yun), also known as the Chamber of Architects of Armenia, was founded in 1932 in Yerevan by the committee under the chairmanship of Gevorg Kochar. The members of committee were Mikayel Mazmanian (Deputy Chairman of the Committee), Nikoghayos Buniatyan, Alexander Tamanyan, A. Aharonian, F. Hakobyan, B. Arazyan, A. Margaryan, M. Mkrtchyan.

== About ==
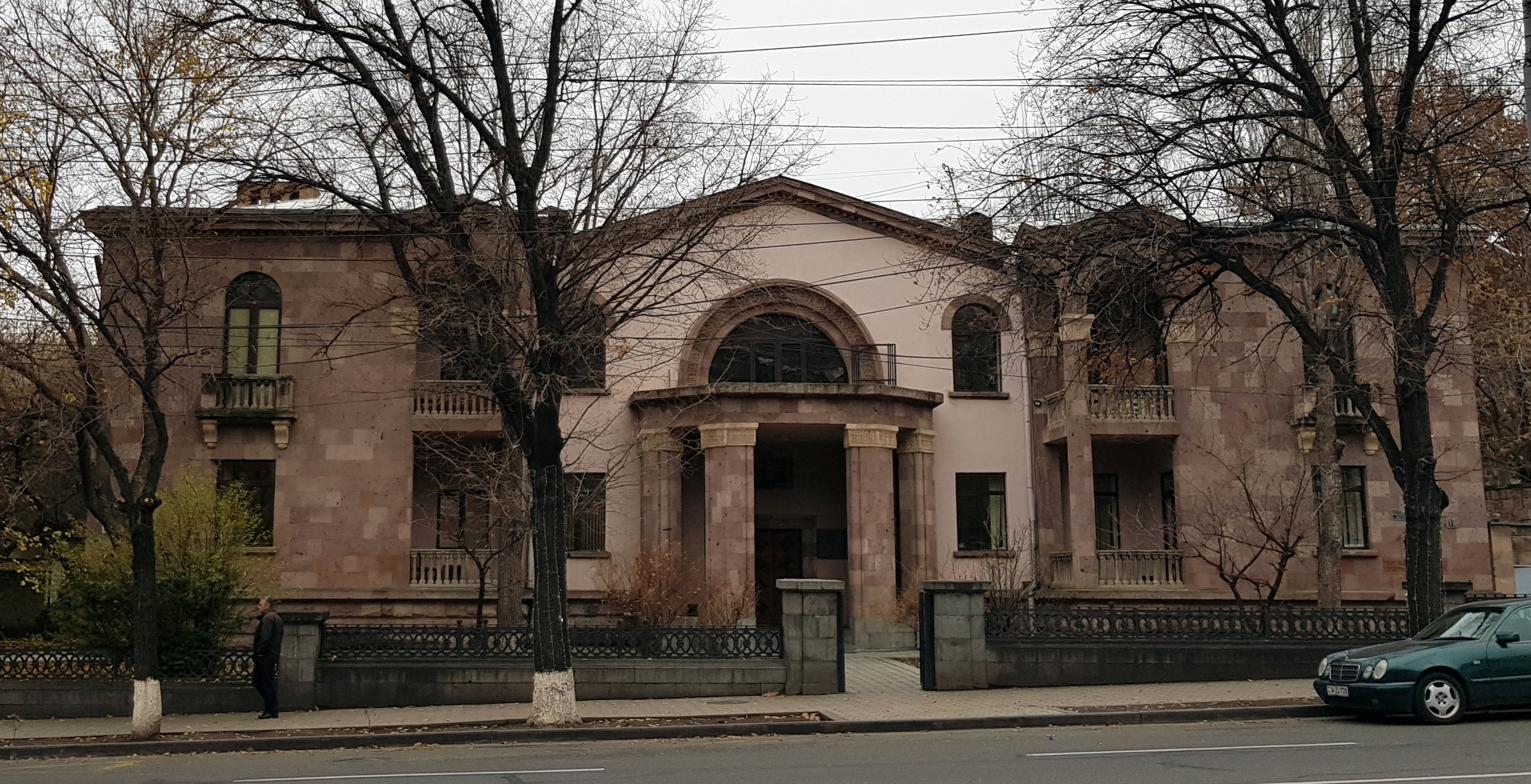
Headquarters of the Armenian Union of Architects

The members of the Union have a significant contribution to the construction of towns, villages, and unique engineered systems throughout Armenia.

Currently, the Union of Architects of Armenia has 643 members. The president is Mkrtich Minasyan. The Union is a full member of the International Union of Architects.

== See also ==
- Armenian architecture
- List of professional architecture organizations
- Research on Armenian Architecture
