= Radisson Blu Hotel, Yerevan =

Hotel in Yerevan, Armenia

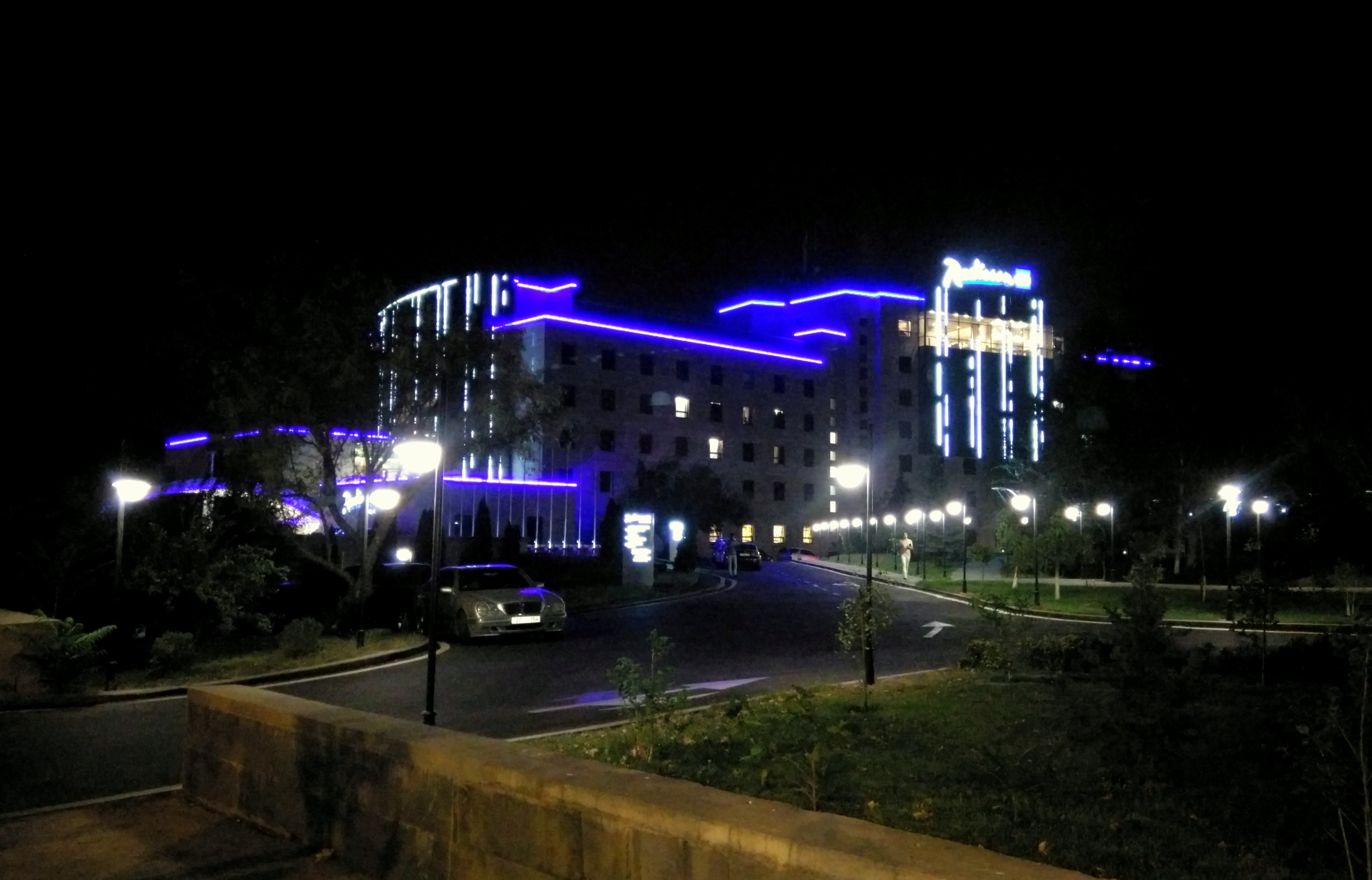
- Radisson Blu Hotel, Yerevan

- Location within Armenia

General information
- Location: Yerevan, Armenia
- Coordinates: 40°11′49″N 44°31′08″E
- Opening: 2005 (as Golden Palace); 2016 (as Radisson Blu)
- Owner: Golden Palace LLC
- Operator: Radisson Hotels

Technical details
- Floor count: 7

Other information
- Number of rooms: 142
- Number of suites: 19
- Number of restaurants: 2
- Parking: Yes

Website
- Official website

Radisson Blu Hotel (Armenian: Ռեդիսոն Բլու Հոթել Երևան), is a hotel in Yerevan, Armenia. It is operated by Radisson Hotels under the Radisson Blu brand. The hotel was originally opened in 2005 as the Golden Palace Yerevan. However, the hotel had been entirely renovated and expanded between 2014 and 2016. It was eventually reopened in July 2016 as the Radisson Blu Hotel, Yerevan.

The hotel is located on 2/2 Liberty Avenue of the Kanaker-Zeytun District, within the Victory Park of Yerevan, near the Yerevan Cascade stairway.

== History ==
On 31 May 2005, the Golden Palace Hotel Yerevan was opened, occupying a portion of the Victory Park of Yerevan. Upon the construction of the hotel, around one thousand trees were removed. At the time of its inauguration, the hotel was home to 66 guestrooms. The opening ceremony was attended by then-president Robert Kocharyan.

In 2014, the hotel was temporarily closed for redevelopment and expansion works. On 12 July 2016, the remodeled hotel was reopened under the name Radisson Blu Hotel, Yerevan operated by the Radisson Hotels. President Serzh Sargsyan attended the opening ceremony, accompanied with the mayor of Yerevan Taron Margaryan.

== Features ==
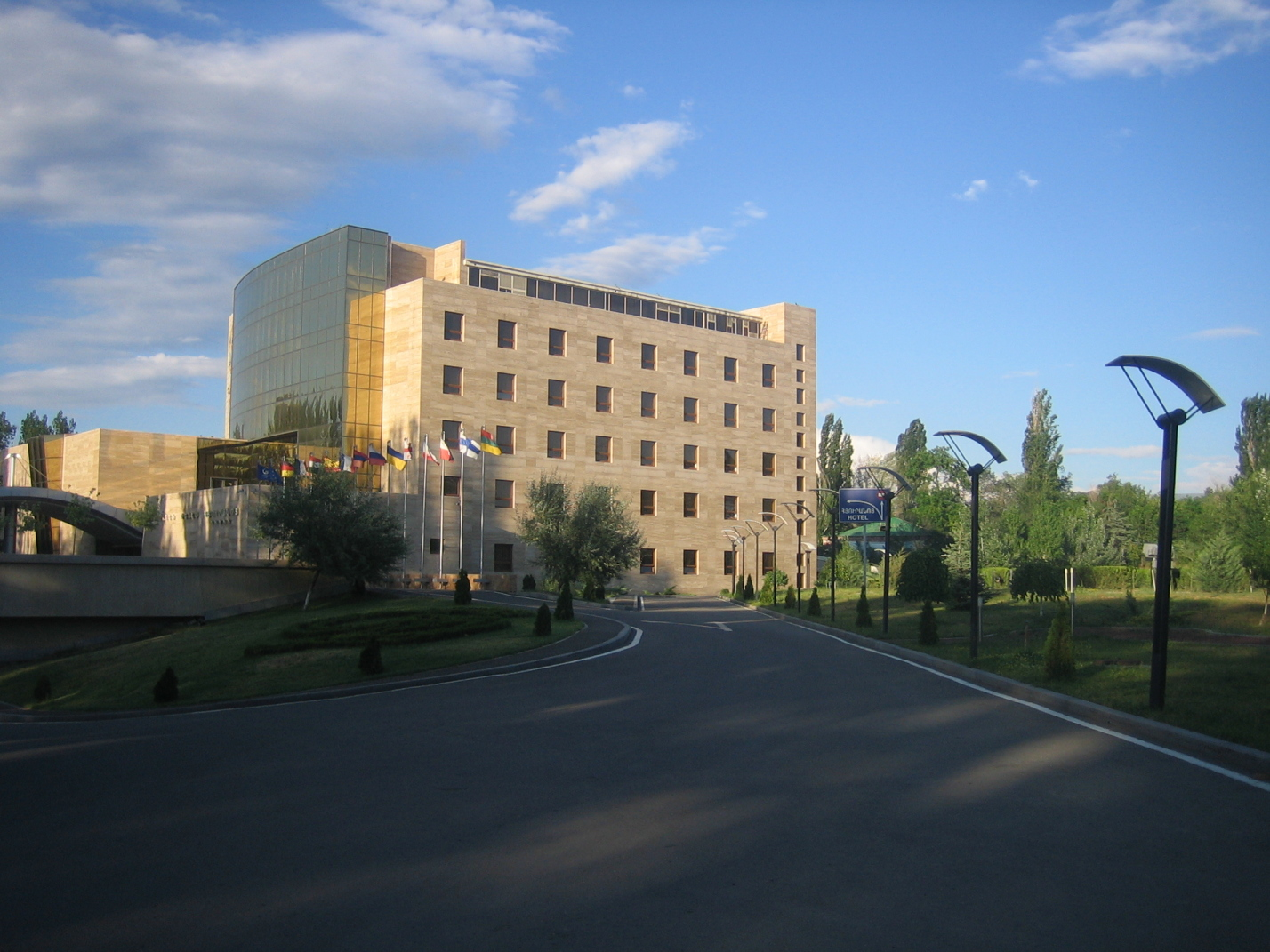
The hotel in 2008, before its redevelopment

The hotel has 142 guestrooms, including 19 suites (with royal, presidential and ambassador suites). The hotel is home to 6 conference halls, a health and spa center, an indoor swimming pool, and an outdoor tennis court.

Many types of cuisines are offered by the hotel through the rooftop restaurant and bar named Ad Astra, the Restaurant Larder and Summer Park, and the restaurant and coffee shop named Darchin. There is also a cigar bar called Havana Club and the Lobby Lounge and Bar.
