= Arabkir =

Arabkir may refer to:

- Arapgir, (in Armenian: Arabkir or Kurdish: Erebgir), a town and district of Malatya Province, Turkey
- Arabkir (district), Yerevan, Armenia
  - Nor Arabkir, an upper middle class urban neighbourhood in Yerevan, the capital of Armenia. It is part of the Arabkir District of the city.
- Arabkir Yerevan, Armenian football team
