= Monument, Yerevan =

Neighborhood of Kanaker-Zeytun district, Yerevan, Armenia

Monument
- Location within Armenia
- Coordinates: 40°11′50″N 44°31′04″E
- Country: Armenia
- Marz (Province): Yerevan
- District: Kanaker-Zeytun
- Time zone: UTC+4 ( )

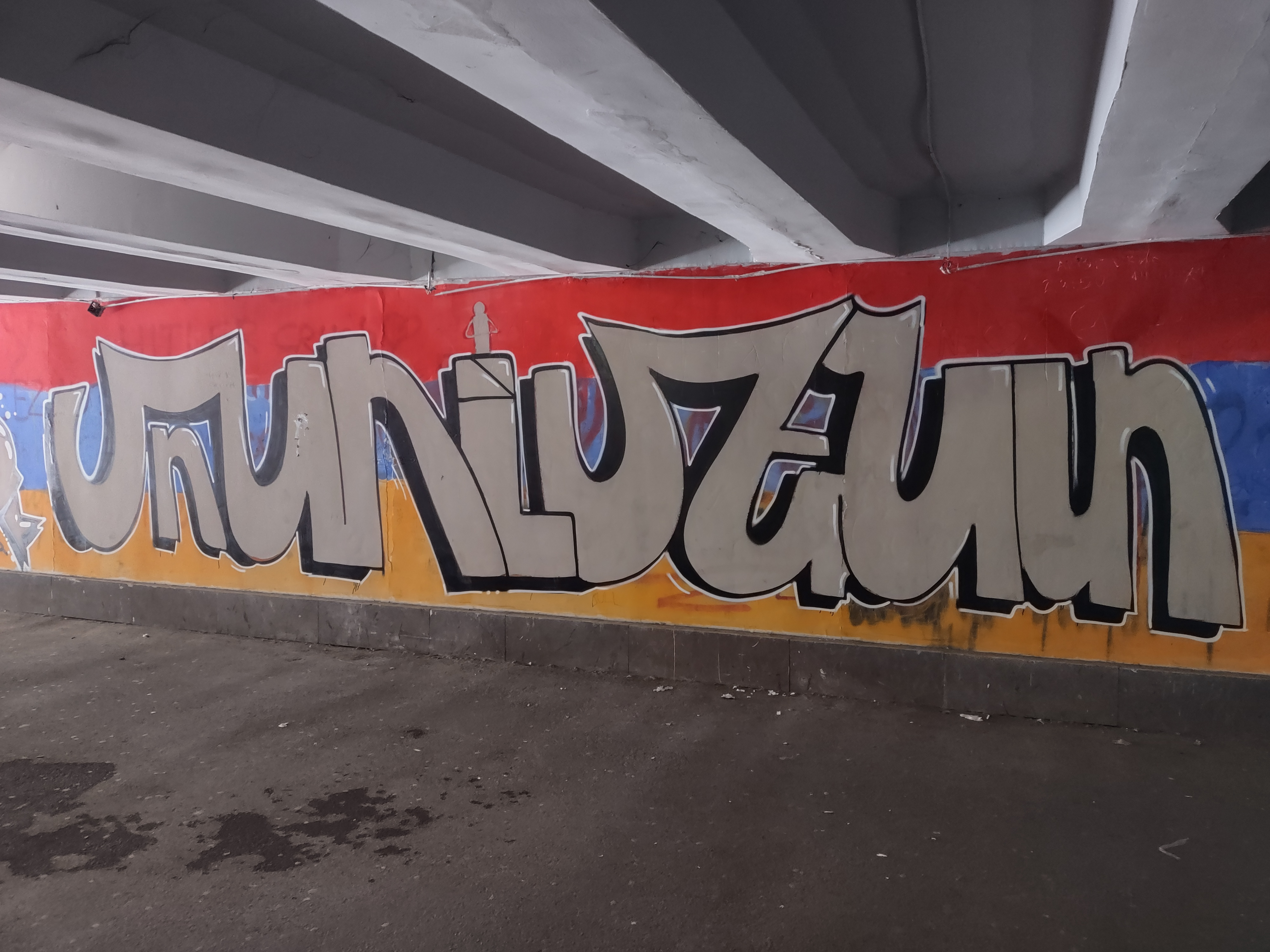
Graffiti spelling "Monument" in Armenian, in the Monument neighborhood of Yerevan

Monument (Armenian: Մոնումենտ) is a neighbourhood in the Kanaker-Zeytun District of the Armenian capital Yerevan. The name of the neighborhood originates from the towering monument inside of Victory Park, which can be seen throughout large parts of Yerevan. The original monument at this site was a 17-meter-tall (56 ft) Stalin, unveiled in 1950, which was replaced with a statue of Mother Armenia in 1967, which is still Yerevan's tallest monument.

In Soviet times and early post-Soviet times there were large green spaces in Monument neighborhood, even outside of the park. During the rule of presidents Kocharyan and Sargsyan however, parts of these green areas were privatized under problematic circumstances for the construction of hotels and mansions. In 2014 the city even walled off a large portion of the green space where all of the land had been privatized and mansions were in various states of construction.

In late 2020 Monument neighborhood saw the installation of a large new Ferris wheel, called Satan's Wheel, which the city authorities declared was installed illegally. It has therefore still not started operation.
