= Liberty Avenue =

Liberty Avenue may refer to:

- Liberty Avenue (Pittsburgh), Pennsylvania, U.S.
- Liberty Avenue (New York City), New York, U.S.
- Liberty Avenue, Yerevan, Armenia
- Laisvės alėja, Kaunas, Lithuania
- Liberty Avenue station, a New York City Subway station
- Liberty Avenue (Lviv), Lviv, Ukraine
- Avenida da Liberdade, Lisbon, Portugal
- Avenue de la Liberté, Luxembourg City, Luxembourg
- Liberty Avenue, Baku, Azerbaijan
