= Liberty Avenue, Yerevan =

Avenue in Yerevan, Armenia

Coordinates: 40°12′07″N 44°31′21″E

Liberty Avenue
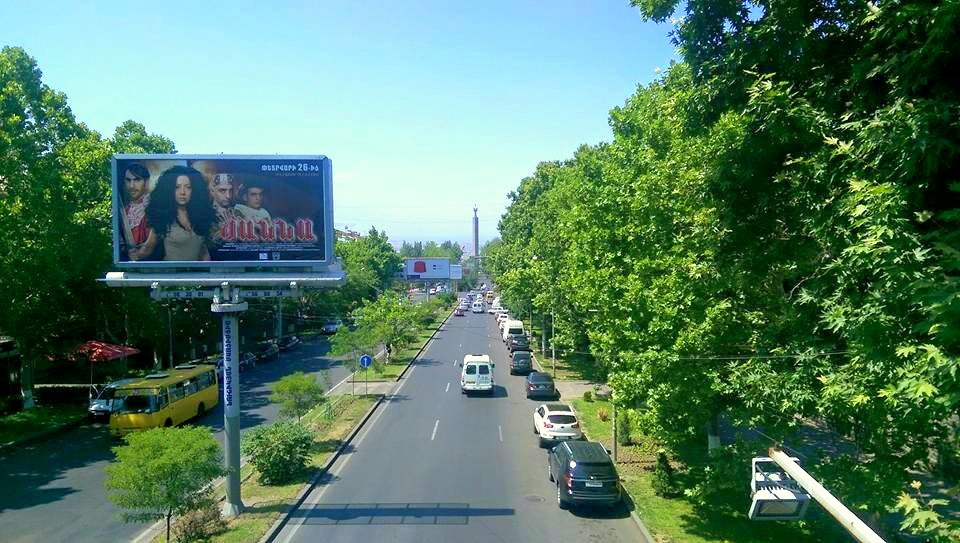
- The Liberty Avenue in summer 2014, view from north to south
- Interactive map of Liberty Avenue
- Native name: Ազատության Պողոտա (Armenian)
- Length: 2.2 km (1.4 mi)
- Location: Kanaker-Zeytun District and Arabkir District, Yerevan, Armenia

Liberty Avenue (Armenian: Ազատության Պողոտա) is an avenue separating the Kanaker-Zeytun District from the Arabkir District in the Armenian capital Yerevan.

The avenue starts with the Yerevan Cascade and the Victory Park at the south and ends up with the Tbilisi Highway at the north, near the abandoned ErAZ automobile factory.

== Notable landmarks ==
Many prominent landmarks of the Yerevan city are located on the Liberty Avenue including:

- The Victory Park of Yerevan, opened during the 1950s.
- The Memorial to the 50th anniversary of the Sovietization of Armenia, erected in 1970.
- Radisson Blu Hotel, Yerevan, opened in 2005 as Golden Palace Hotel.
- The Scientific Technological Center of Organic and Pharmaceutical Chemistry of the Armenian National Academy of Sciences, founded in 2006.

== Gallery ==
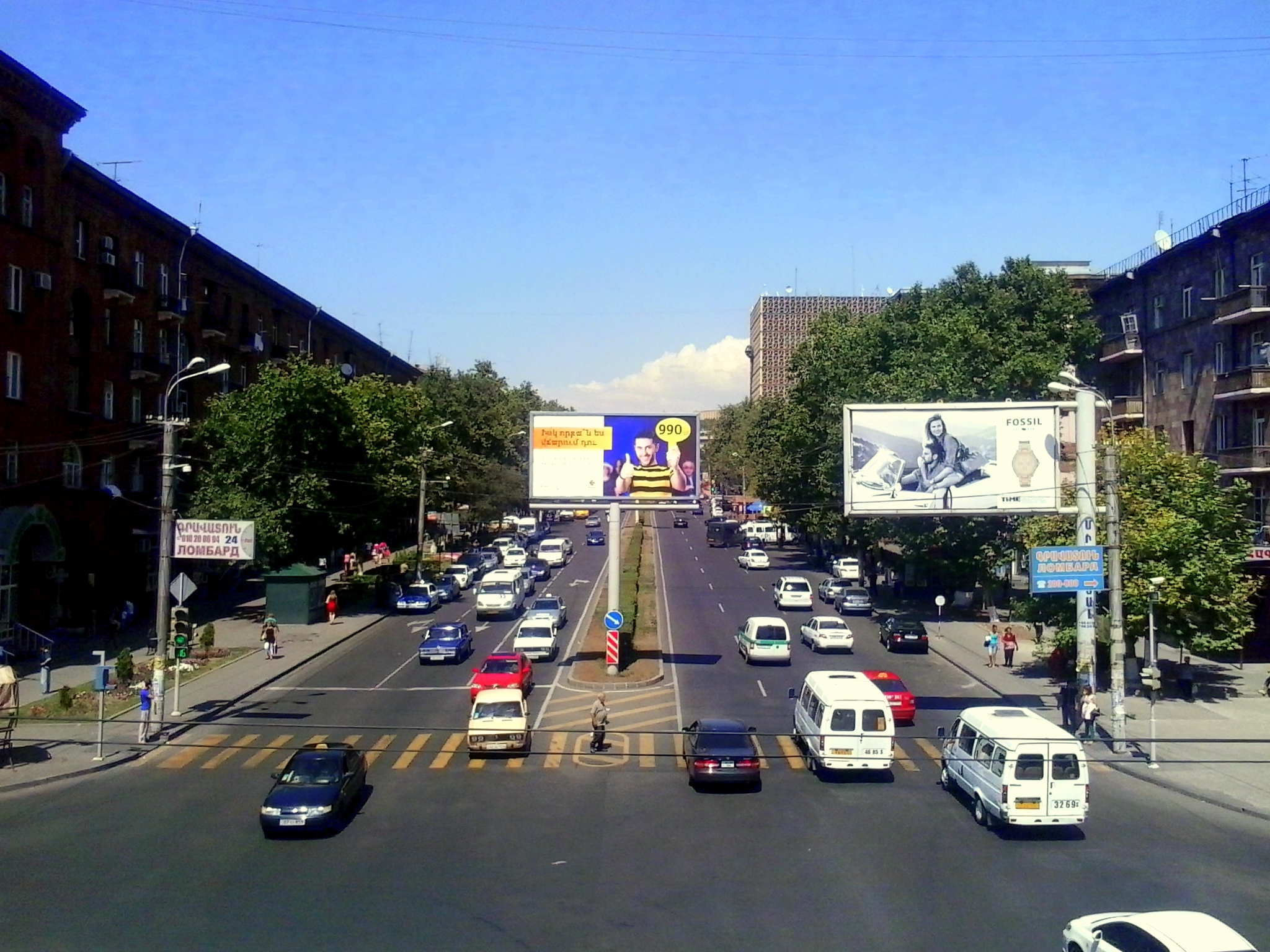
The Liberty Avenue from south to north

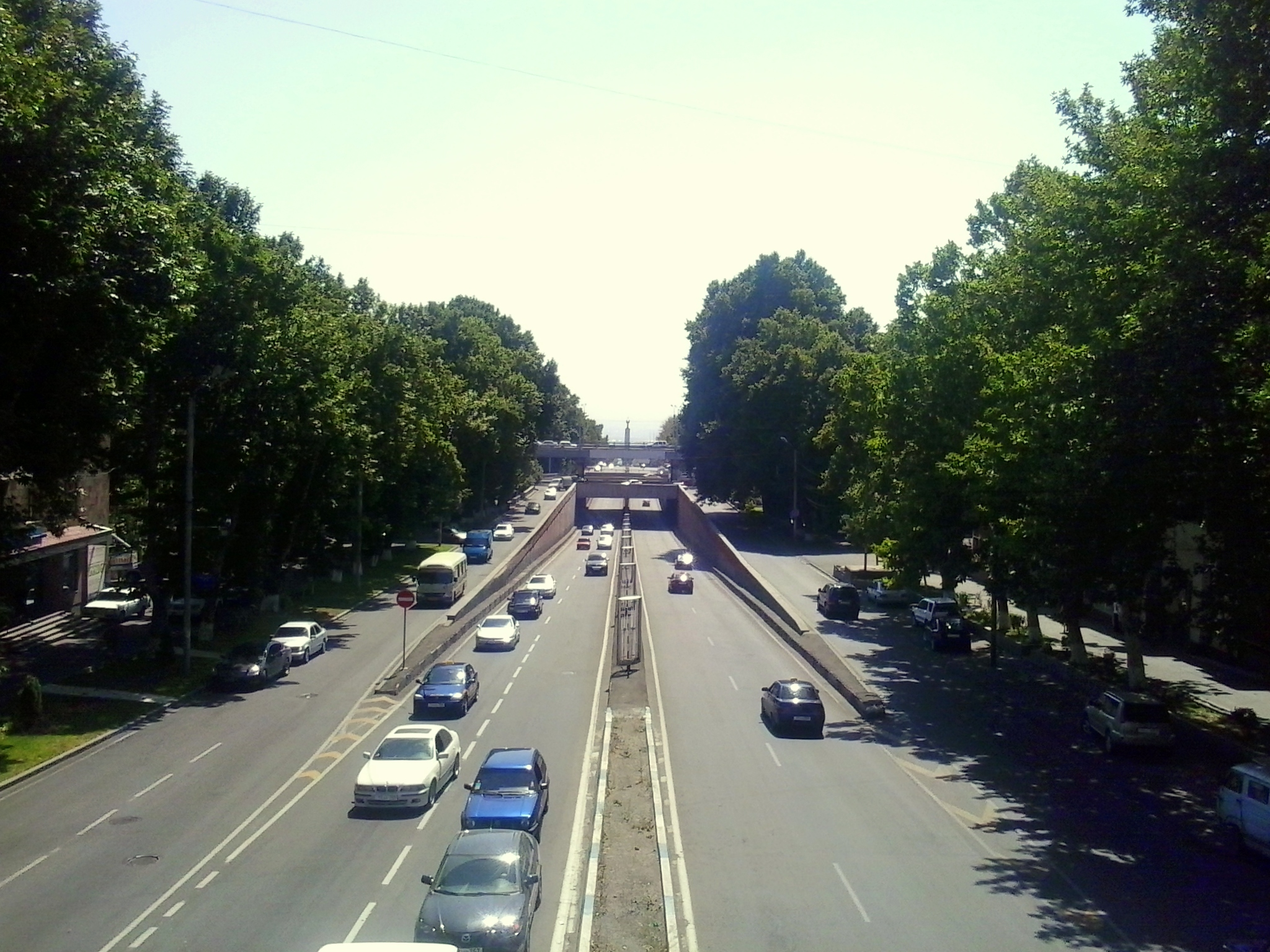
The Liberty Avenue from north to south

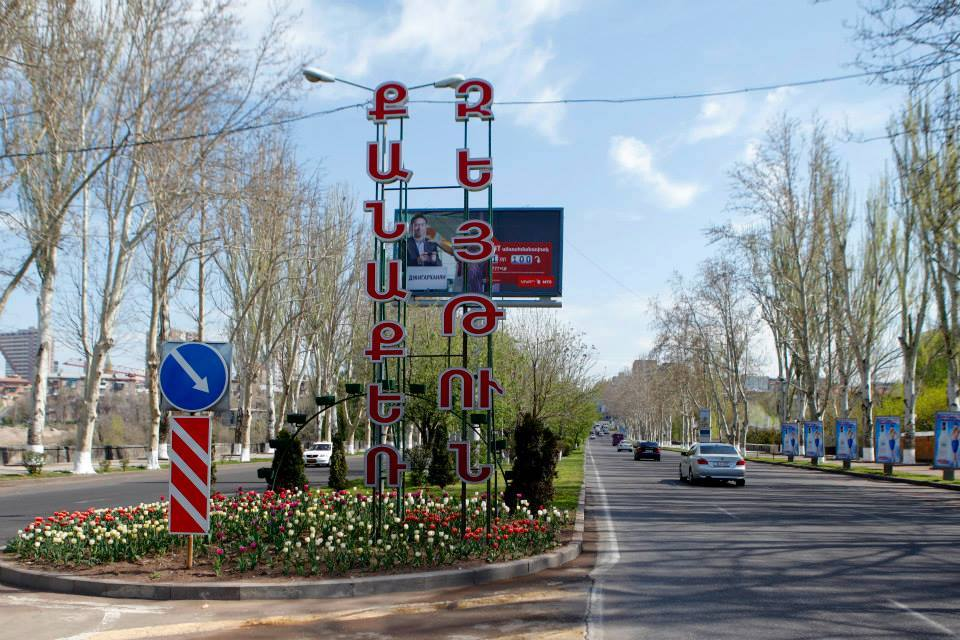
The Liberty Avenue at the entrance to the Kanaker-Zeytun District from the south

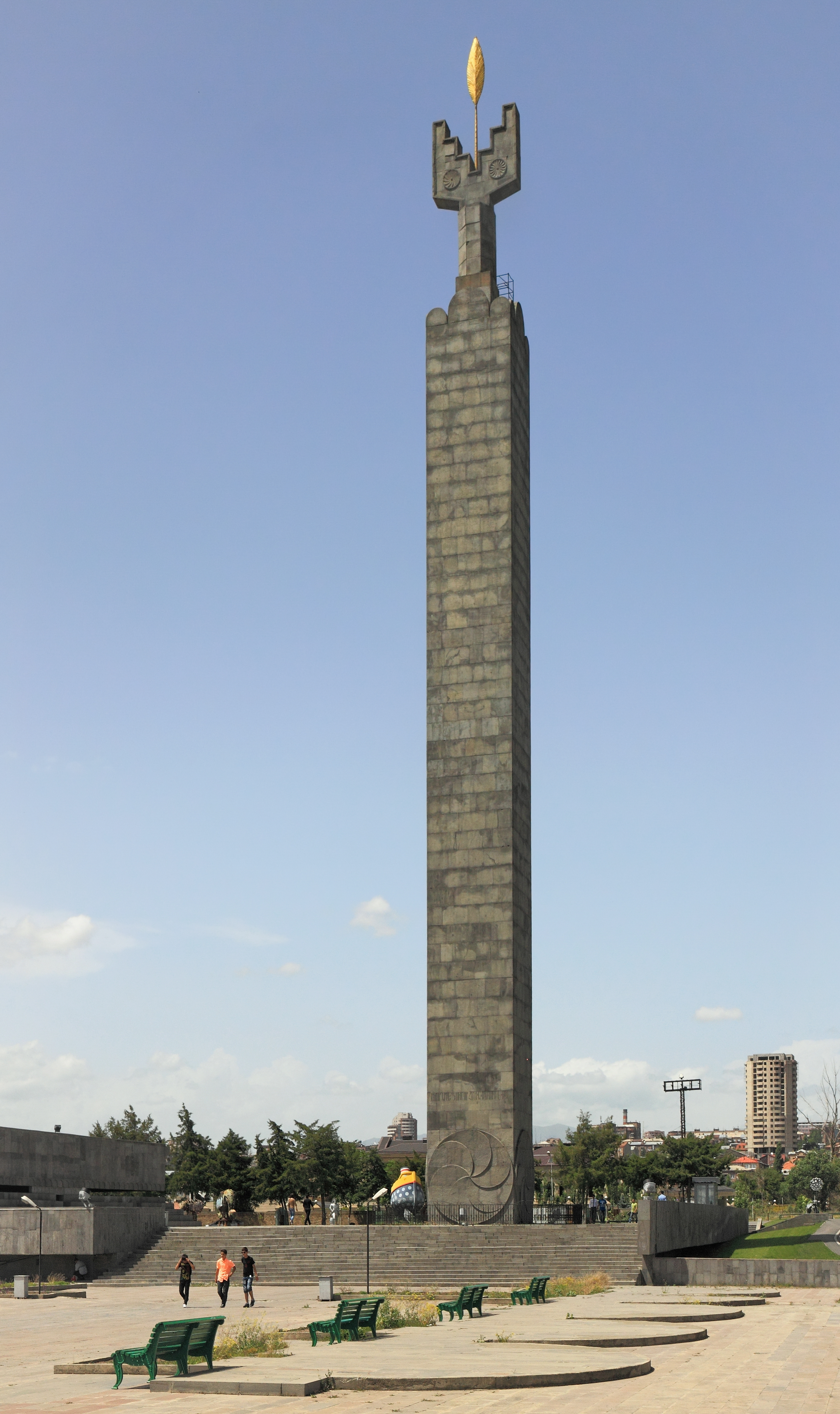
The Memorial to the 50th anniversary of the Sovietization of Armenia
