= Nor Zeytun =

- Location within Armenia
- Coordinates: 40°12′13″N 44°32′35″E
- Country: Armenia
- Marz (Province): Yerevan
- District: Kanaker-Zeytun
- Time zone: UTC+4 ( )

Nor Zeytun (Armenian: Նոր Զեյթուն, also Zeytun) is a neighbourhood in Yerevan, the capital of Armenia. It is part of the Kanaker-Zeytun District of the city.

To establish the Zeytun district in 1944, the Artsvabuyn Zeytun Reconstruction Committee was formed in Aleppo. After the repatriation of Armenians, in 1948, the members of the Committee received permission and established and constructed the new Zeytun district in Yerevan.
