= Victory Park, Yerevan =

Park in Yerevan, Armenia

Victory Park
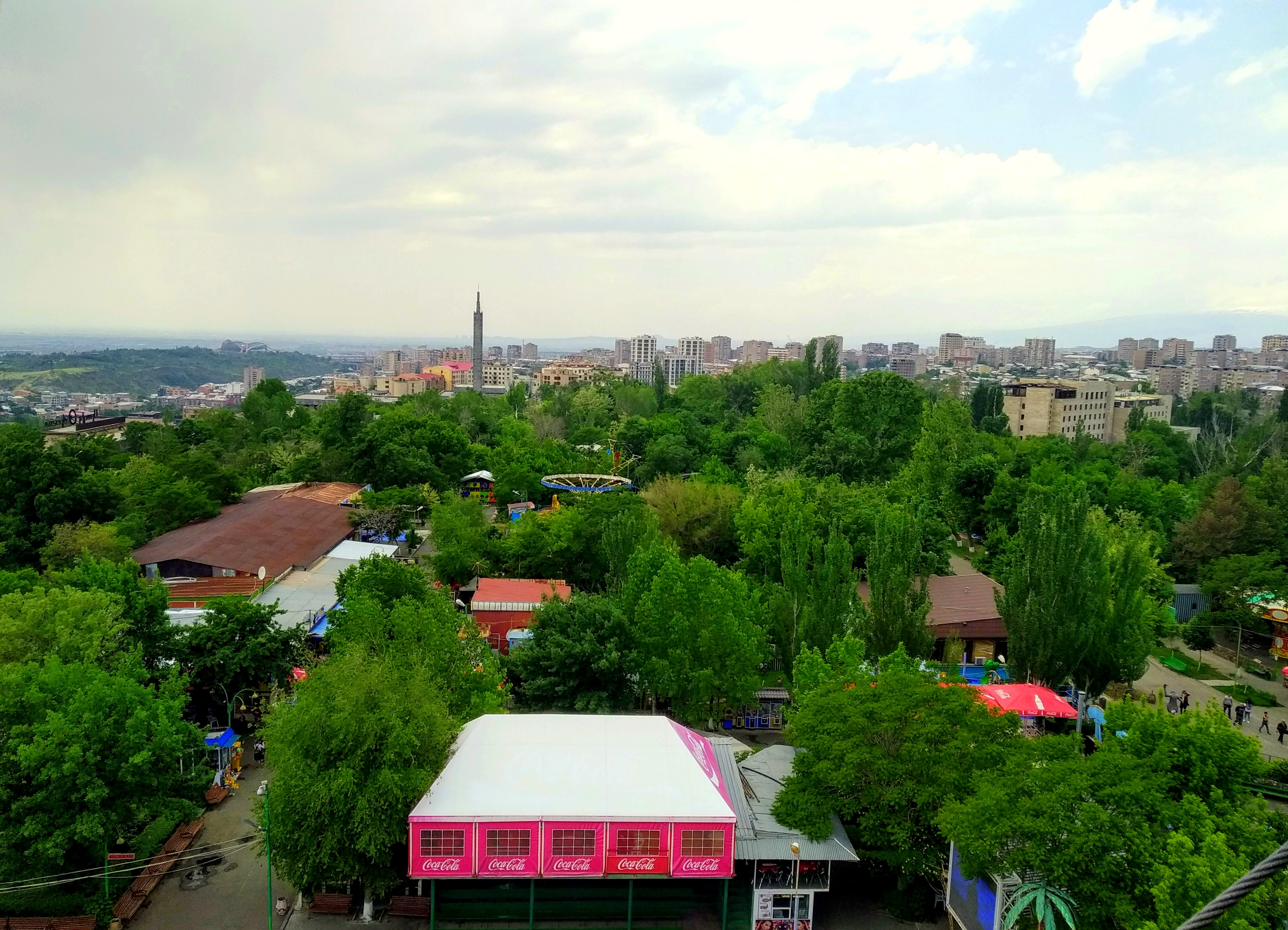
- Interactive map of Victory Park
- Type: Urban park
- Location: Kanaker-Zeytun District, Yerevan, Armenia
- Coordinates: 40°11′45″N 44°31′11″E
- Area: 34 hectares (84 acres)
- Created: 1950
- Operator: Yerevan City Council
- Status: Open all year

Victory Park (Armenian: «Հաղթանակ» զբոսայգի Haght'anak zbosaygi), is a public park located in the Kanaker-Zeytun District of Yerevan, the capital of Armenia.

== History ==
The construction of the park was launched during the late 1930s as the "Arabkir city park", within the frames of the development of the Nor Arabkir neighbourhood at the north of Yerevan; the capital of the Armenian Soviet Socialist Republic. After the Great Patriotic War, the park was renamed "Victory Park", commemorating the Soviet victory over Nazi Germany at the Eastern Front of World War II.

After the war, the Victory Park was opened on November 29, 1950, at the 30th anniversary of the Sovietization of Armenia. On the same day, a 17-meters high copper statue of Joseph Stalin designed by People's Artist of the USSR Sergey Merkurov was erected in the park, while the basalt-stoned pedestal of the statue was designed by another People's Artist of the USSR Rafayel Israyelian.

In 1962, the statue of Stalin was dismantled, and replaced by the monumental statue of Mother Armenia in 1967, designed by architect Ara Harutyunyan. In 1970, a museum dedicated to Armenia's role in the Great Patriotic War was opened within the pedestal of the statue. However in 1995, it was turned into the Military Museum of Armenia governed by the Ministry of Defence.

== Description ==
In 1956, a small amusement park was opened on the eastern portion of the park. In 1958, the construction of the Arevik artificial lake designed by architect Hovhannes Hakobyan was launched, and completed in 1961, while in 1959, a restaurant called Aragil (meaning stork) designed by Rafayel Israyelian was opened in the park.

Between 1983 and 1985 the park was closed for major restoration works. On May 9, 1985, the opening of the Heroes Alley and the Unknown Soldier's Tomb took place near the Mother Armenia complex, on the 40th anniversary of the Great Victory at the World War II. In 1989, a new ferris wheel was installed at the amusement park replacing the old one.

== Gallery ==
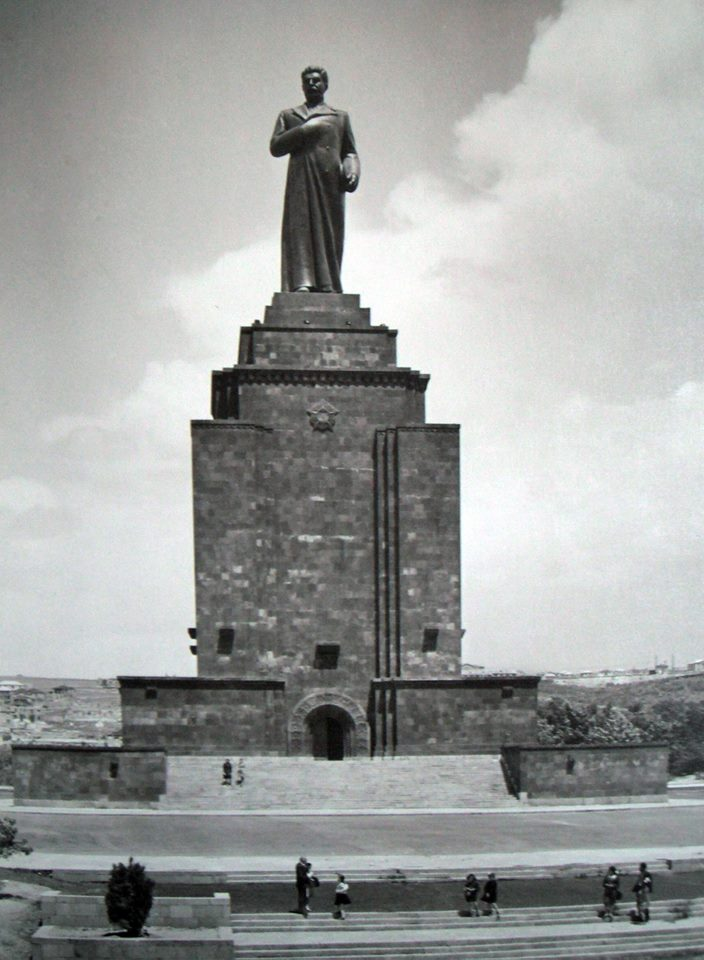
The monumental statue of Joseph Stalin which was replaced by the statue of Mother Armenia

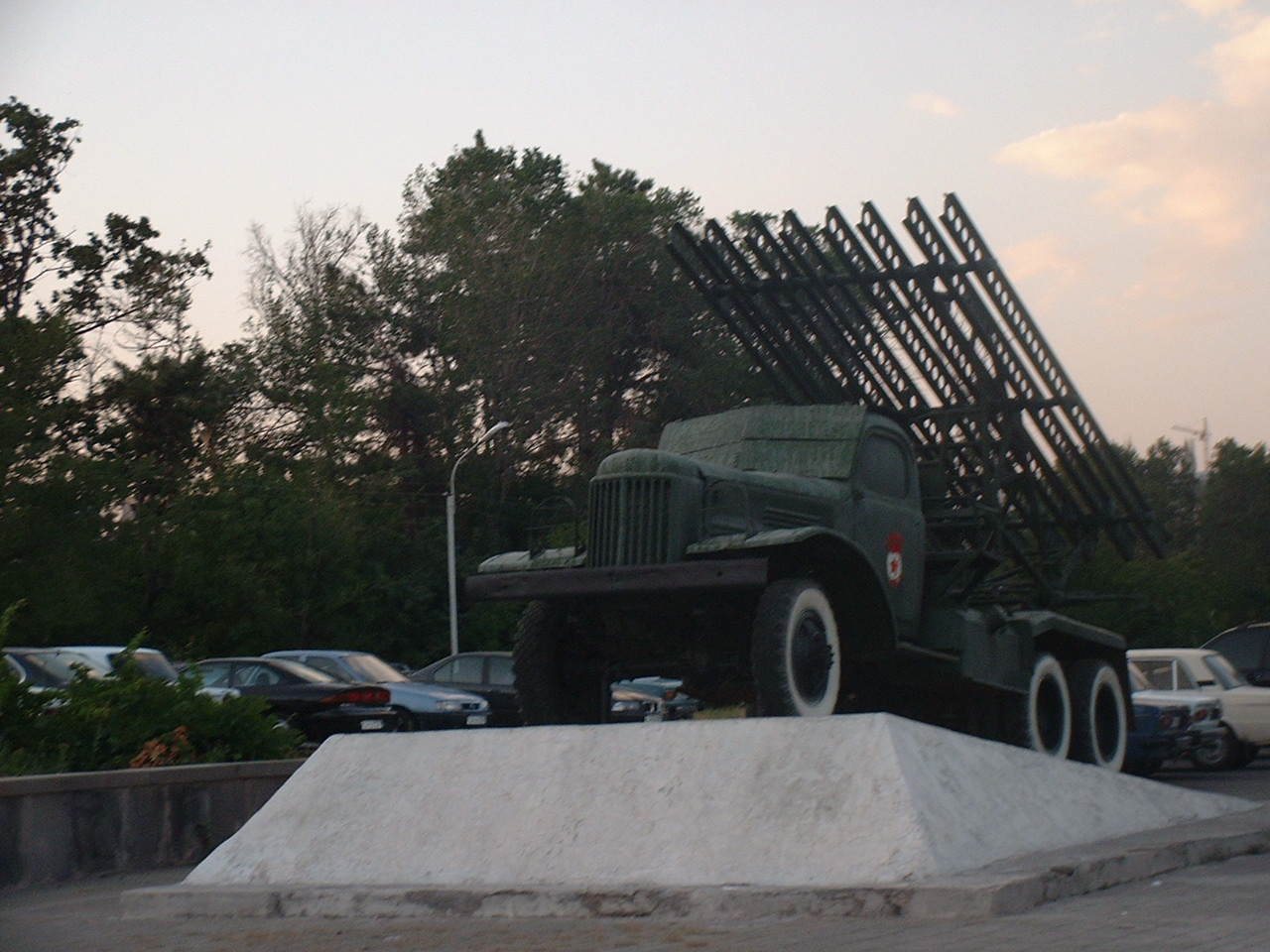
Soviet Katyusha rocket launcher

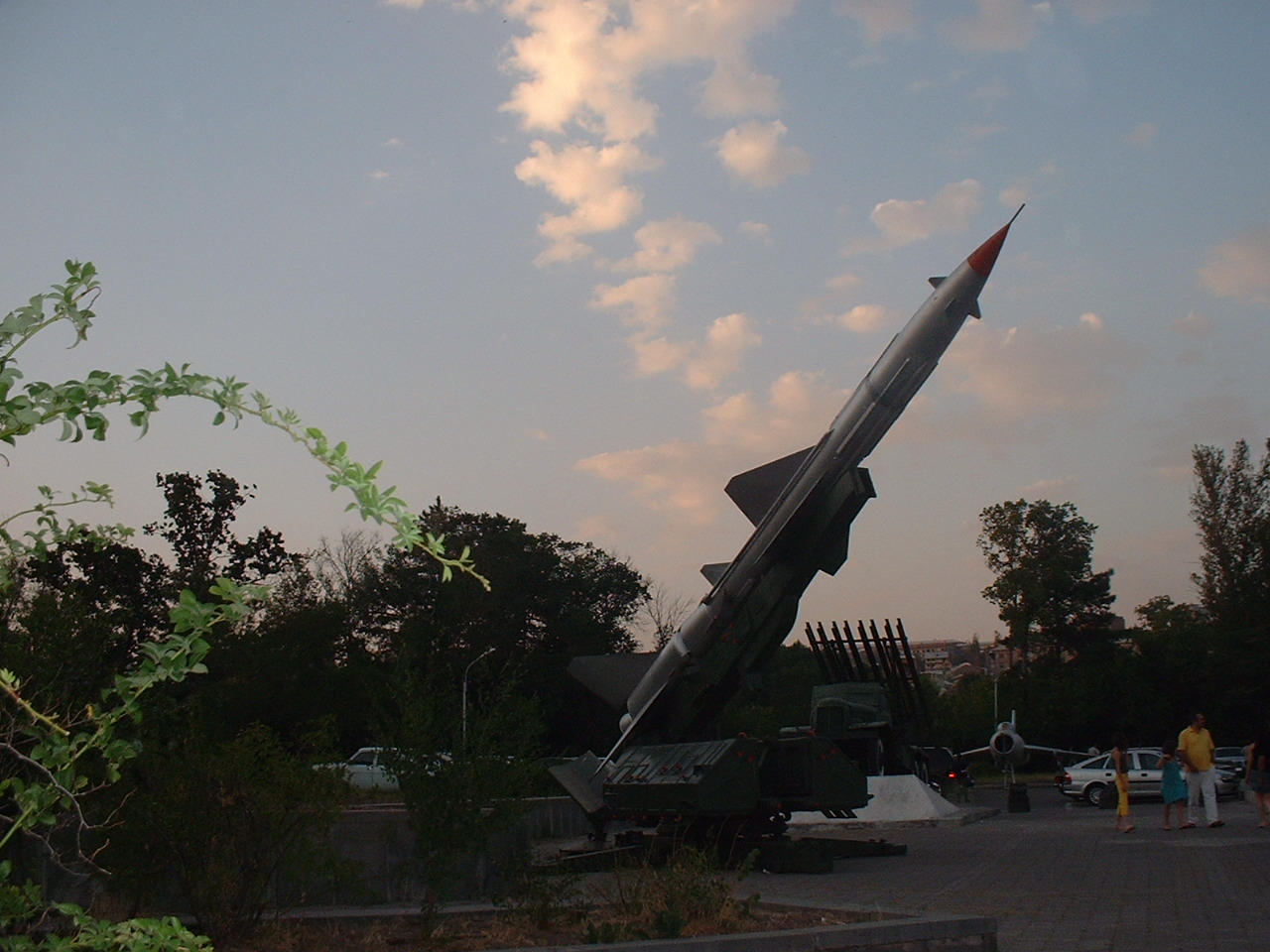
Soviet S-75 surface-to-air missile

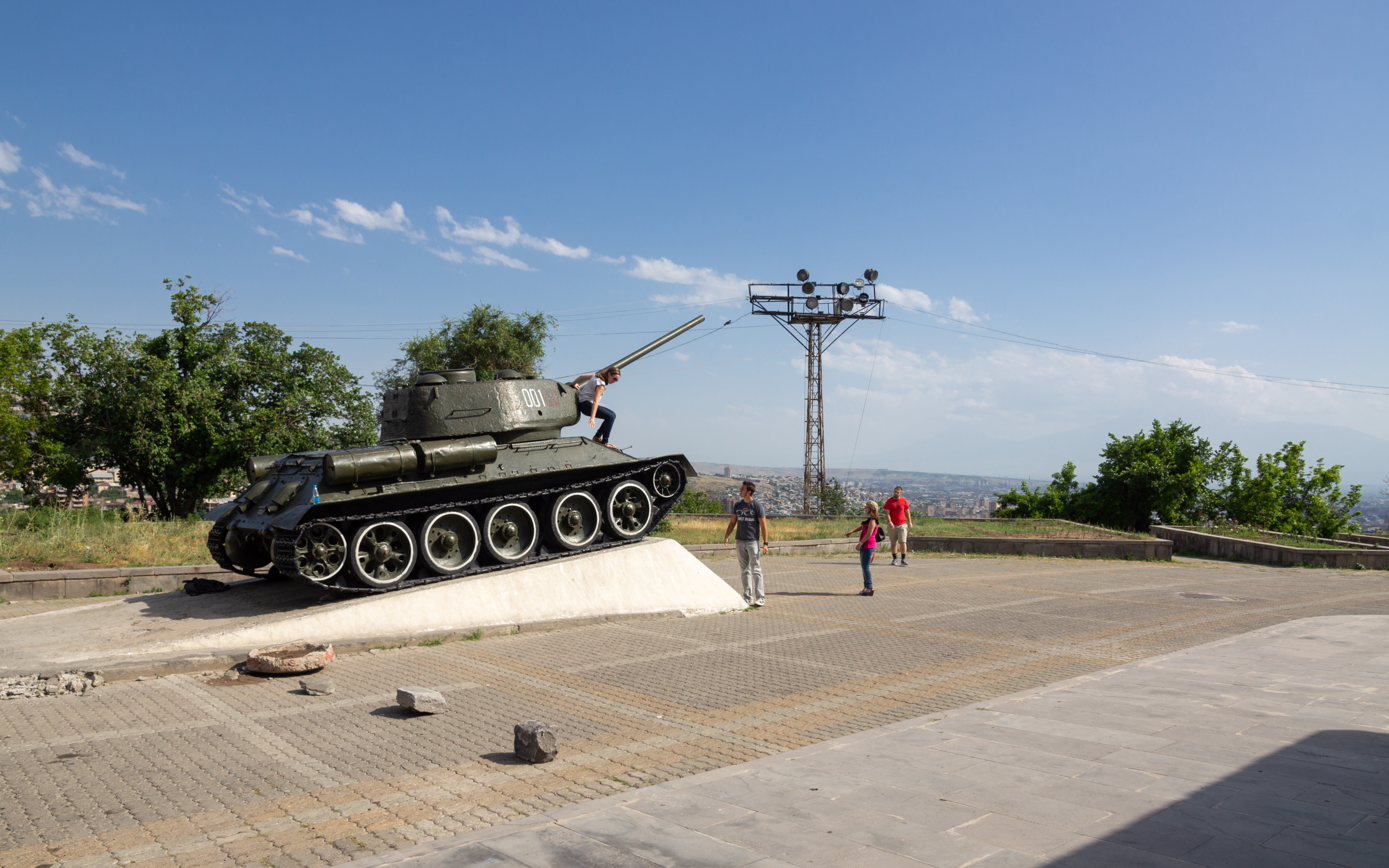
Soviet T-34 tank

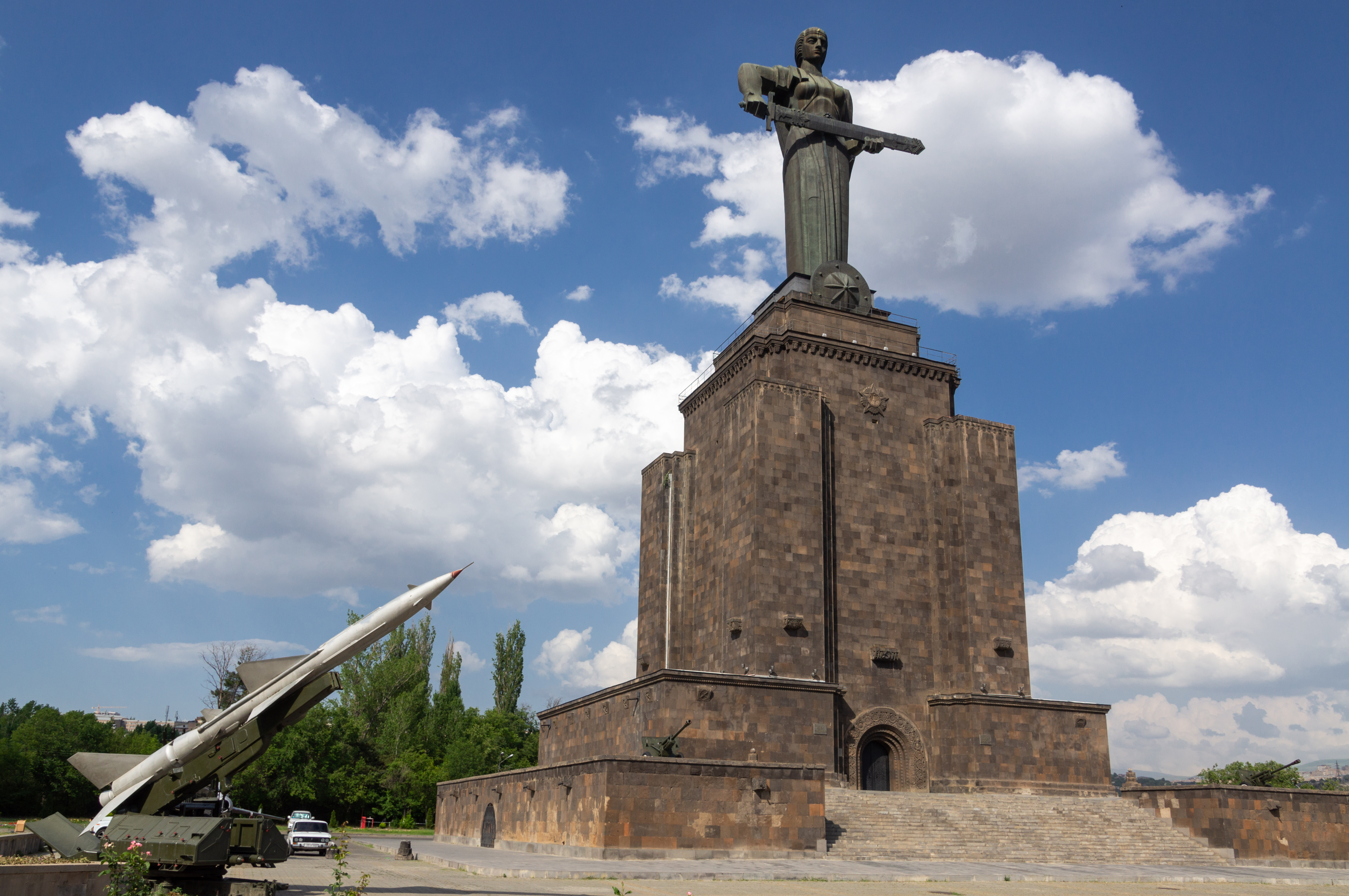
The monumental statue of Mother Armenia at the park

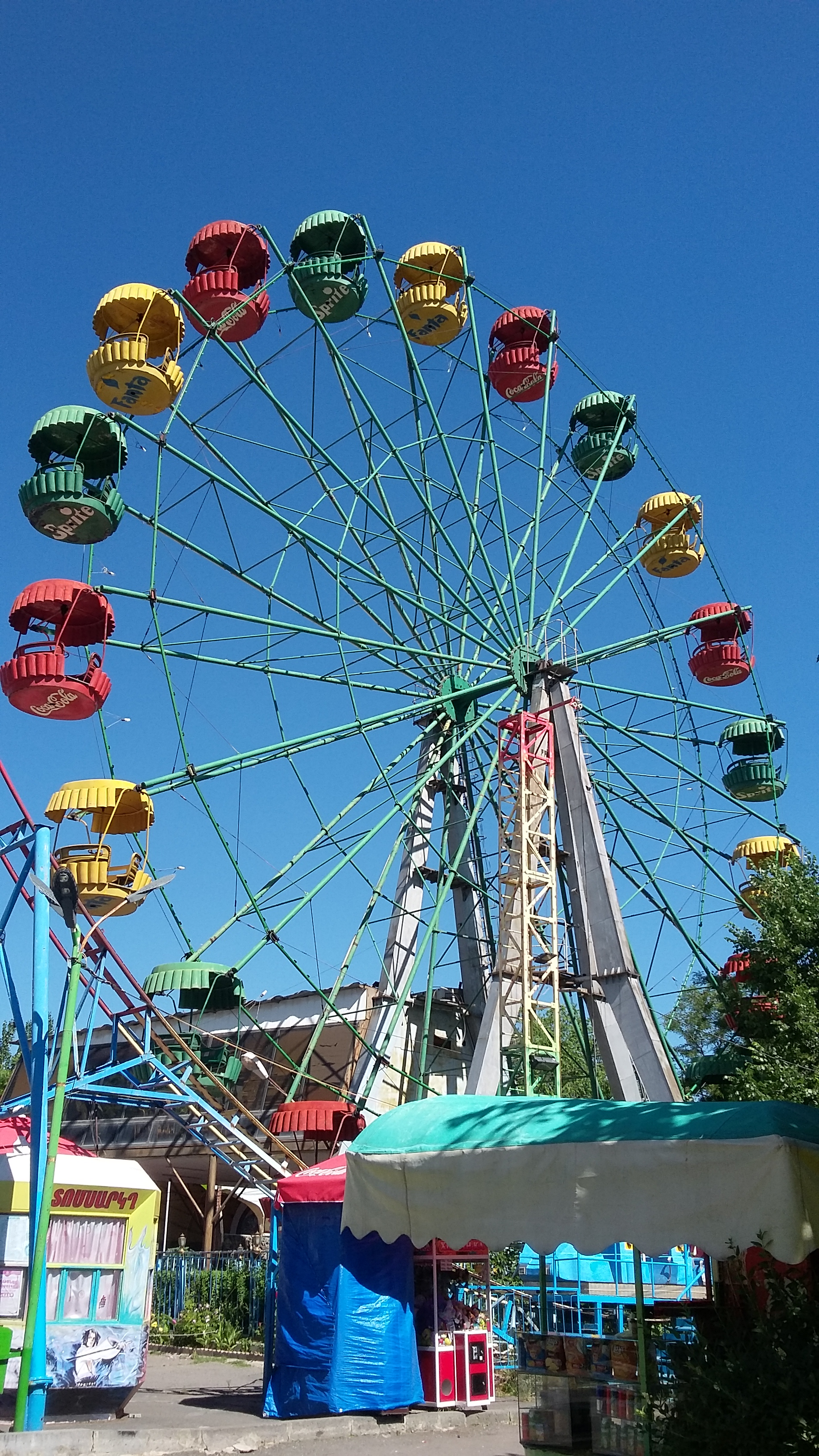
The Ferris wheel at Victory Park

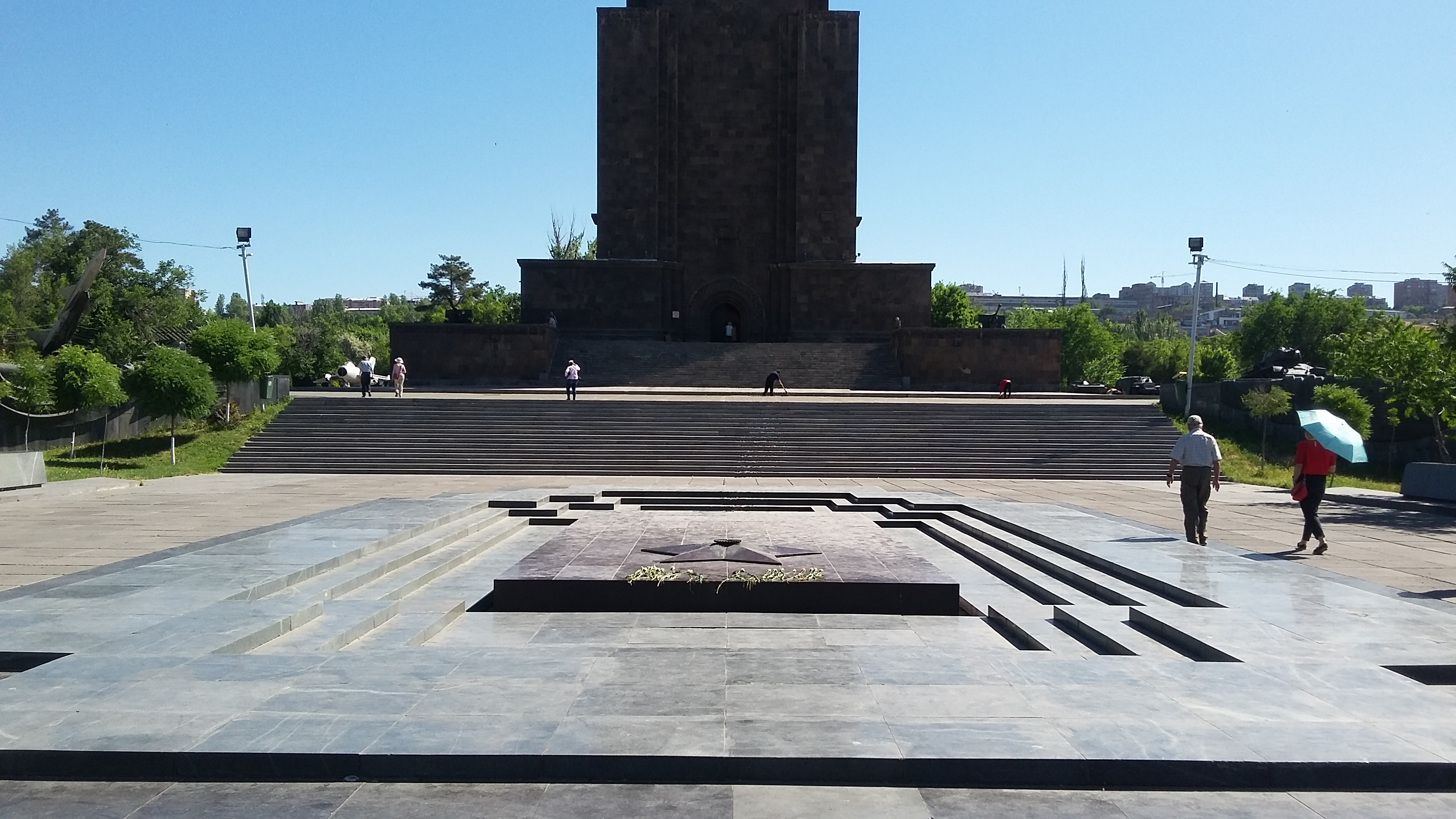
The Tomb of the Unknown Soldier

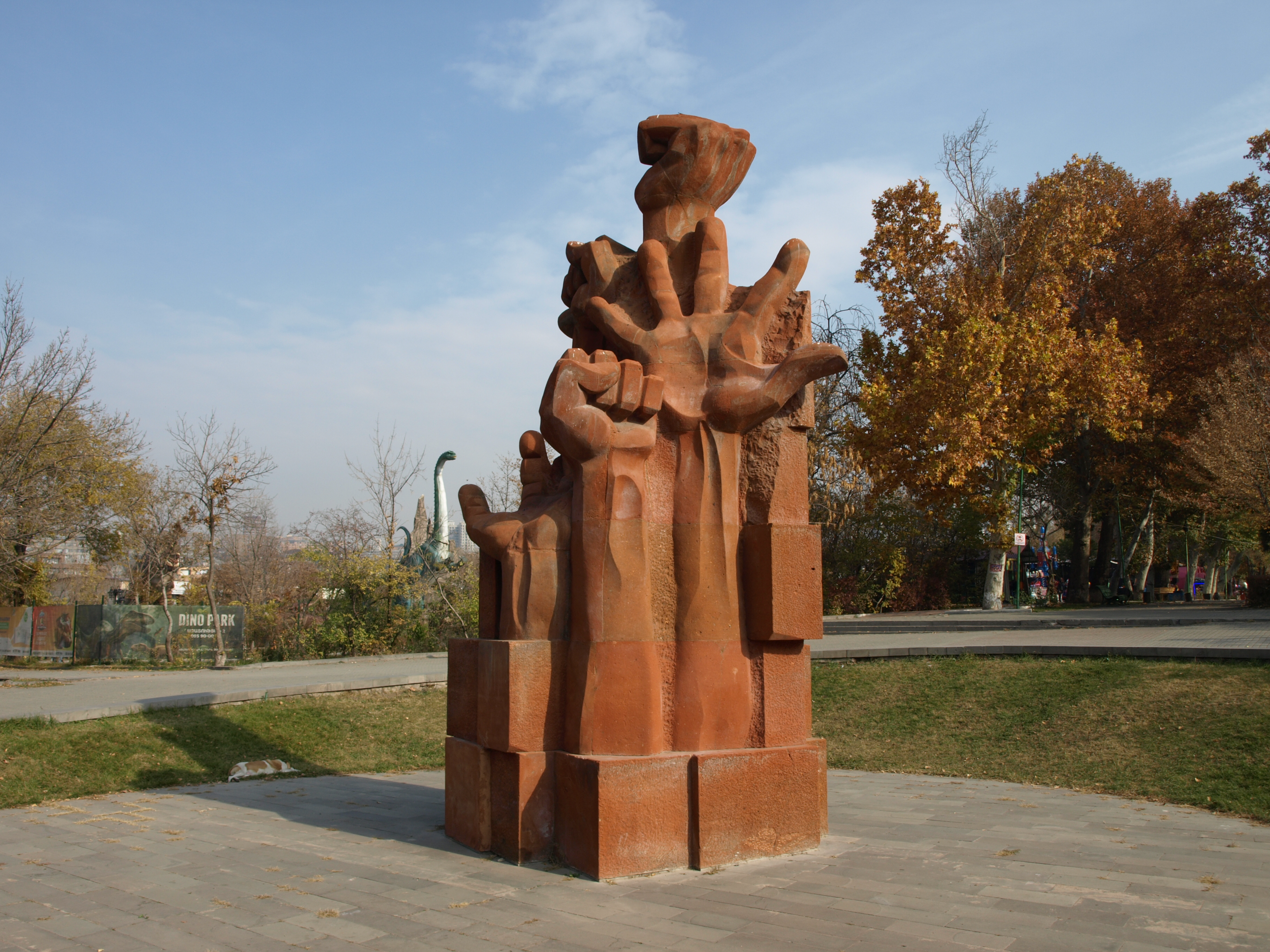
No To War Monument
