= Kanaker-Zeytun District =

District in Yerevan, Armenia

Kanaker-Zeytun Քանաքեռ-Զեյթուն
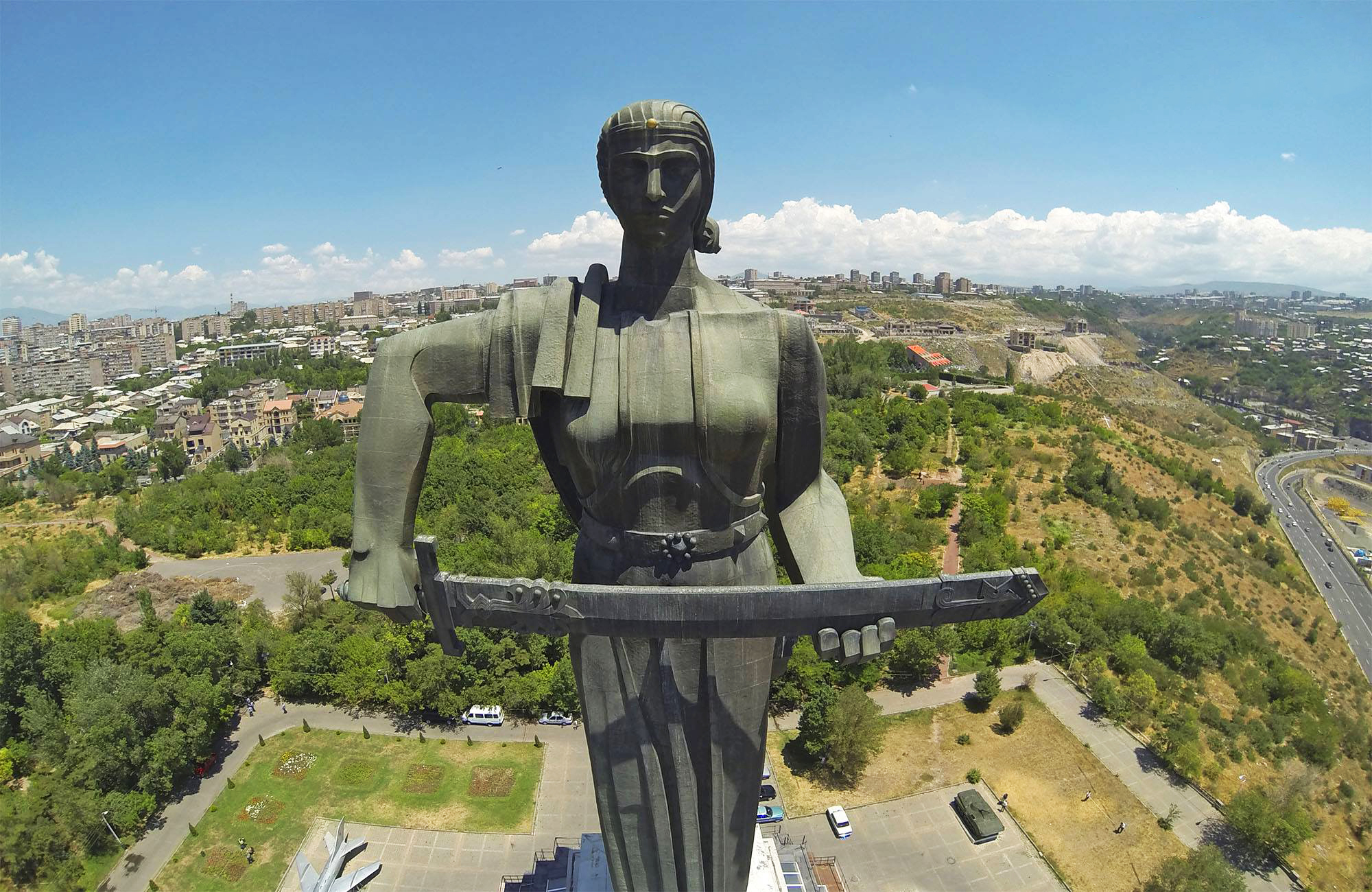
- View of Kanaker-Zeytun from Mother Armenia

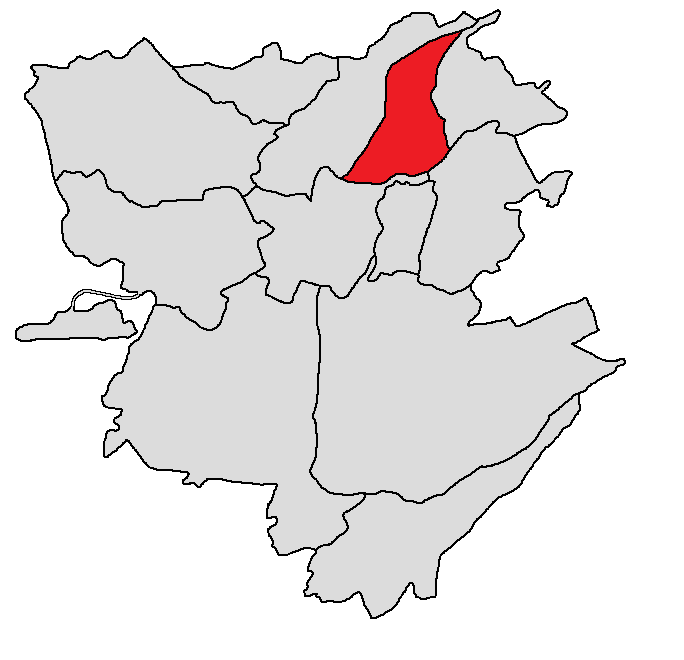
- Coordinates: 40°13′12″N 44°32′18″E
- Country: Armenia
- Marz (Province): Yerevan

Government
  - Mayor of District: Karen Hakobyan

Area
  - Total: 7.73 km^{2} (2.98 sq mi)
- Elevation: 1,280 m (4,200 ft)

Population (2022 census)
  - Total: 73,834
  - Density: 9,550/km^{2} (24,700/sq mi)
- Time zone: UTC+4 ( )

Kanaker-Zeytun (Armenian: Քանաքեռ-Զեյթուն վարչական շրջան, romanized: K’anak’er’-Zeyt’un varch’akan shrjan) is one of the 12 districts of Yerevan, the capital of Armenia, located in the northeastern part of the city. As of the 2022 census, the population of the district is 73,834.

Located on a hill overlooking the central part of Yerevan, the administrative district of Kanaker-Zeytun has common borders with the districts of Avan, Arabkir, Kentron and Nor Nork. By the outer border it is adjacent to the provinces of Armavir, Aragatsotn and Kotayk.

The district is unofficially divided into smaller neighborhoods such as Kanaker, Nor Zeytun and Monument.

== History ==
Kanaker has developed as a satellite town of Yerevan throughout the history. With many historical churches and monuments, Kanaker was severely damaged in the earthquake of 1679. The town has played a key role in the Russian siege of Yerevan in 1827.

Many prominent figures of Armenian literature and art are natives of Kanaker such as historian Zakaria Kanakertsi, writer Khachatur Abovian and musician Djivan Gasparyan.

In order to establish the Zeytun district in 1944, the Artsvabuyn Zeytun Reconstruction Committee was formed in Aleppo, whose members were Panos Norashkharyan, Yeghia Alajajyan, Rev. Petros Kilikian, Hovsep Bshtikyan, Harutyun Azaryan, Parunak Shishikyan, KarapetKarapet Tozlikyan (Yeghyan) and Levon Chopuryan. The committee had 3 additional members in Yerevan: Avetis Surenyan, Dovlat Karanfilyan, and Dovlat Boyamian.

After the repatriation of in 1948, the members of the committee received permission to construct the new Nor Zeytun settlement at the north of Yerevan.

With the rapid growth of Yerevan, Kanaker and Nor Zeytun were gradually absorbed and became part of the Armenian capital. After the independence of Armenia, Kanaker and Nor Zeytun were merged and formed a single district within the capital, bearing the name Kanaker-Zeytun. Currently, the district is among the developing areas of the capital with a population of 79,600 and an area of 8.1 km^{2}.

The district is home to many industrial plants including the Yerevan Champagne Wines Factory, the Coca-Cola Bottlers Armenia Factory and the Pepsi Bottlers Armenia Factory. The district is also home to the Gazprom Armenia headquarters.

== Streets and landmarks ==
=== Main streets ===
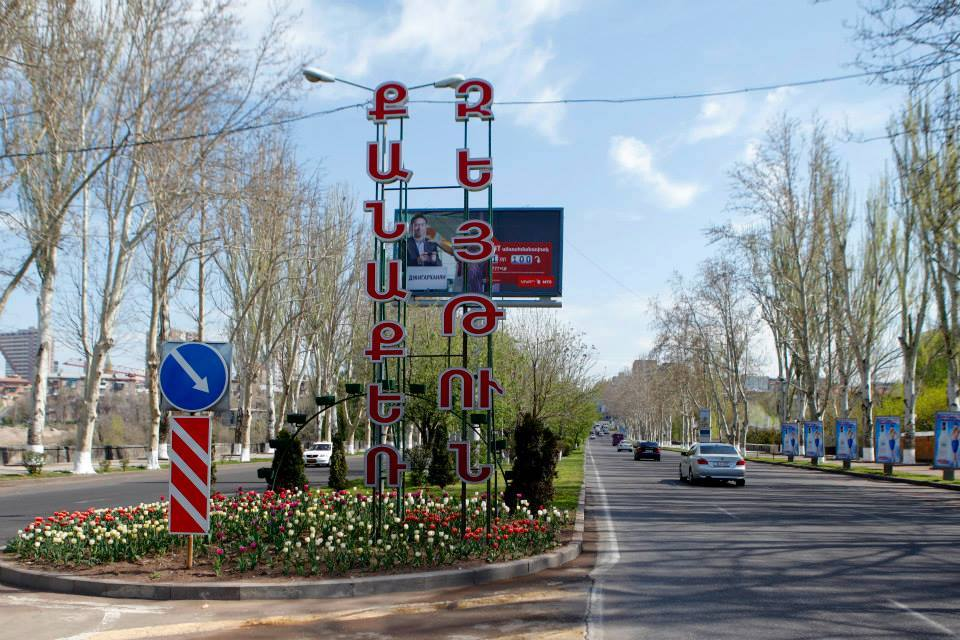
Liberty Avenue

- Liberty Avenue.
- David Anhaght street.
- Avetis Aharonyan street.
- Paruyr Sevak street.
- Rubinyants street.
- Zakaria Kanakertsi street.
- Tbilisi Highway.

=== Landmarks ===
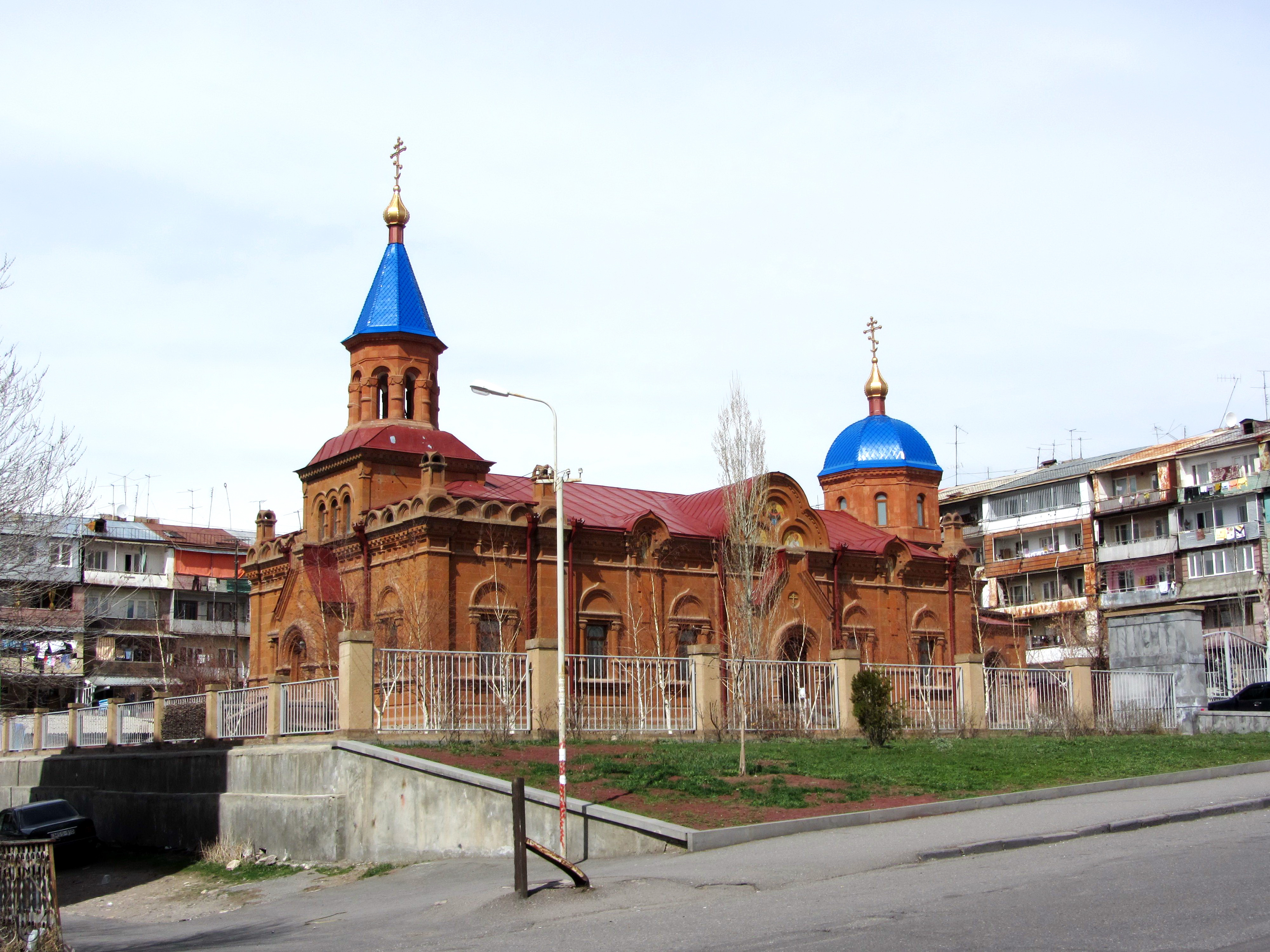
The Russian church of the Intercession of the Holy Mother of God

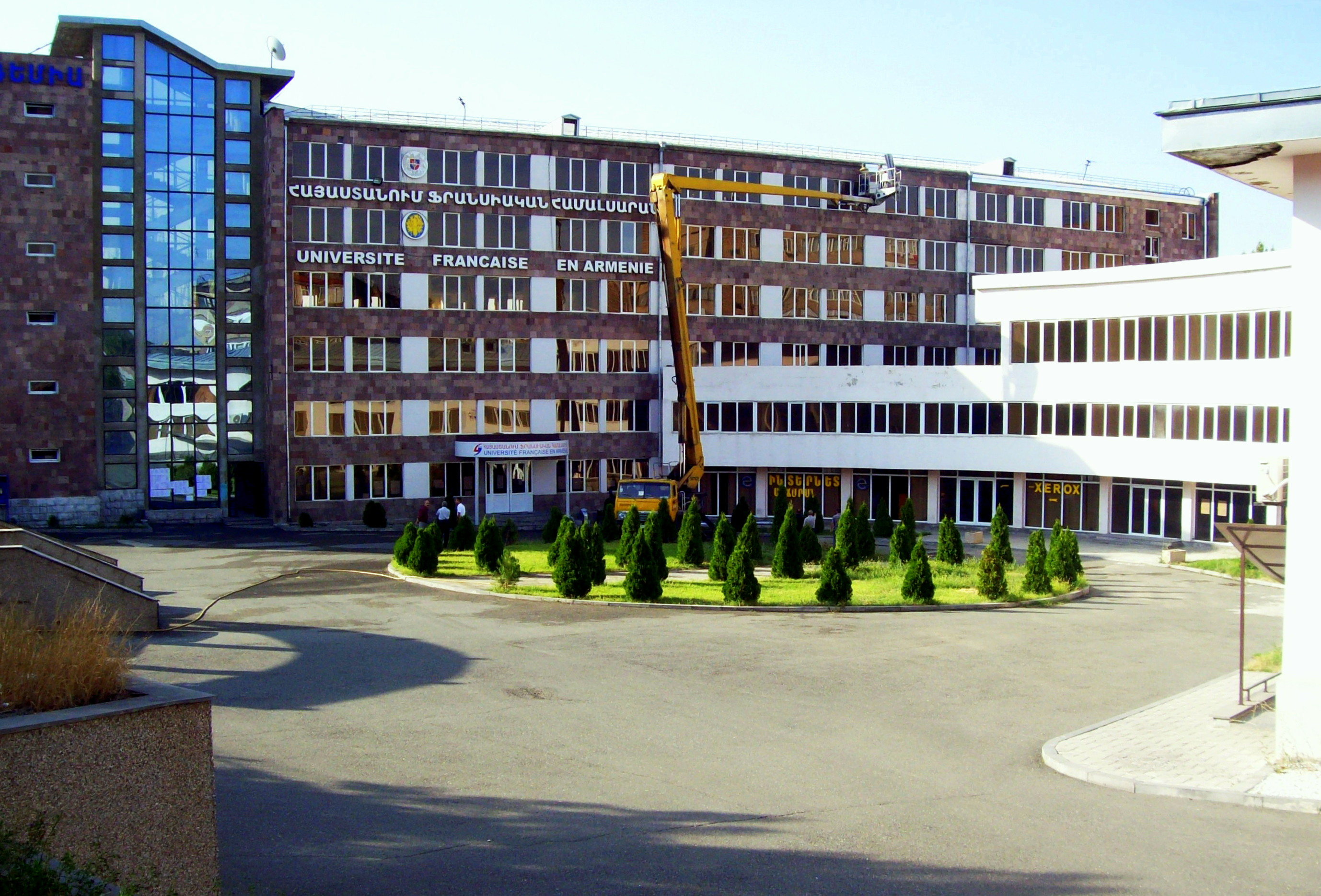
The French University in Armenia

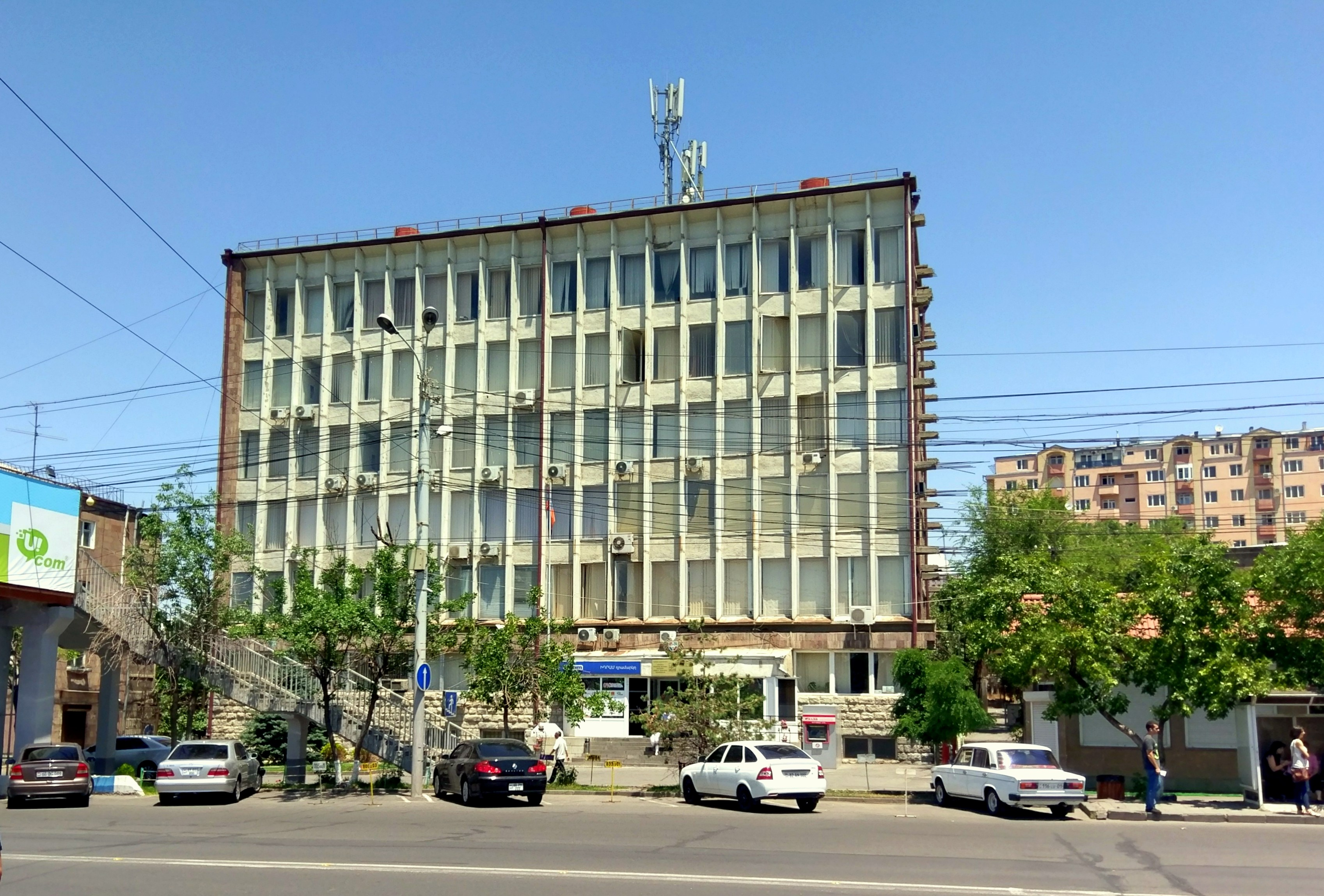
Kanaker-Zeytun District administration

- Surp Hakob (Saint Jacob) Church of Kanaker: built at the end of the 17th century on the foundations of the old church of Kanaker damaged during the 1679 earthquake. The church is of three-nave basilica type with two couples of pillars. Many sculptured cross-stones dating back to 1504, 1571 and 1621, are fixed on the western front of the church. The church was closed during the Soviet rule until 1990, when it was restored and reopened by the government.
- The historic Church of the Holy Mother of God in Kanaker, built in 1695 on the foundations of the old church damaged as a result of the 1679 earthquake. During the Soviet period, the church was turned into a warehouse. Between 1959 and 1963, the church was renovated through the efforts of the Armenian Organization for Historical Monuments Preservation.
- The old cemetery of Kanaker with its historic chapel.
- The Petevan tombstone of 1265.
- The Russian Orthodox Church of the Intercession of the Holy Mother of God built between 1912 and 1916, stands near the Russian military base of Yerevan.
- House-museum of Khachatur Abovyan in Kanaker.
- The medieval well of Kanaker.
- Mother Armenia: the World War II memorial, the Military museum and the Tomb of the Unknown Soldier.
- The Monument to the 50th anniversary of the Sovietization of Armenia.
- Victory Park.
- Davit Anhaght park.
- Paruyr Sevak park.
- Eurasia International University.
- French University in Armenia (UFAR).
- European University in Armenia.
- Izmirlian Medical Center.
- The Scientific Technological Center of Organic and Pharmaceutical Chemistry.
- The Institute of Oncology and Radiology.
- The Institute of Molecular Biology of National Academy of Sciences.

== Education ==
Chinese-Armenian Friendship School is in Kanaker.

== Gallery ==
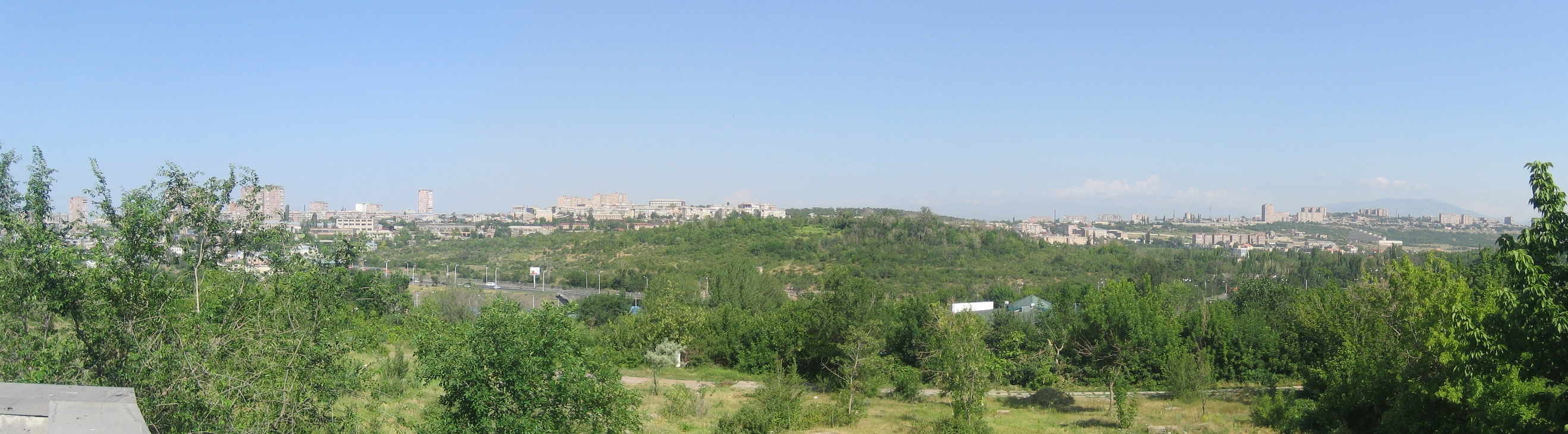
View of Kanaker-Zeytun from the east

Kanaker-Zeytun district

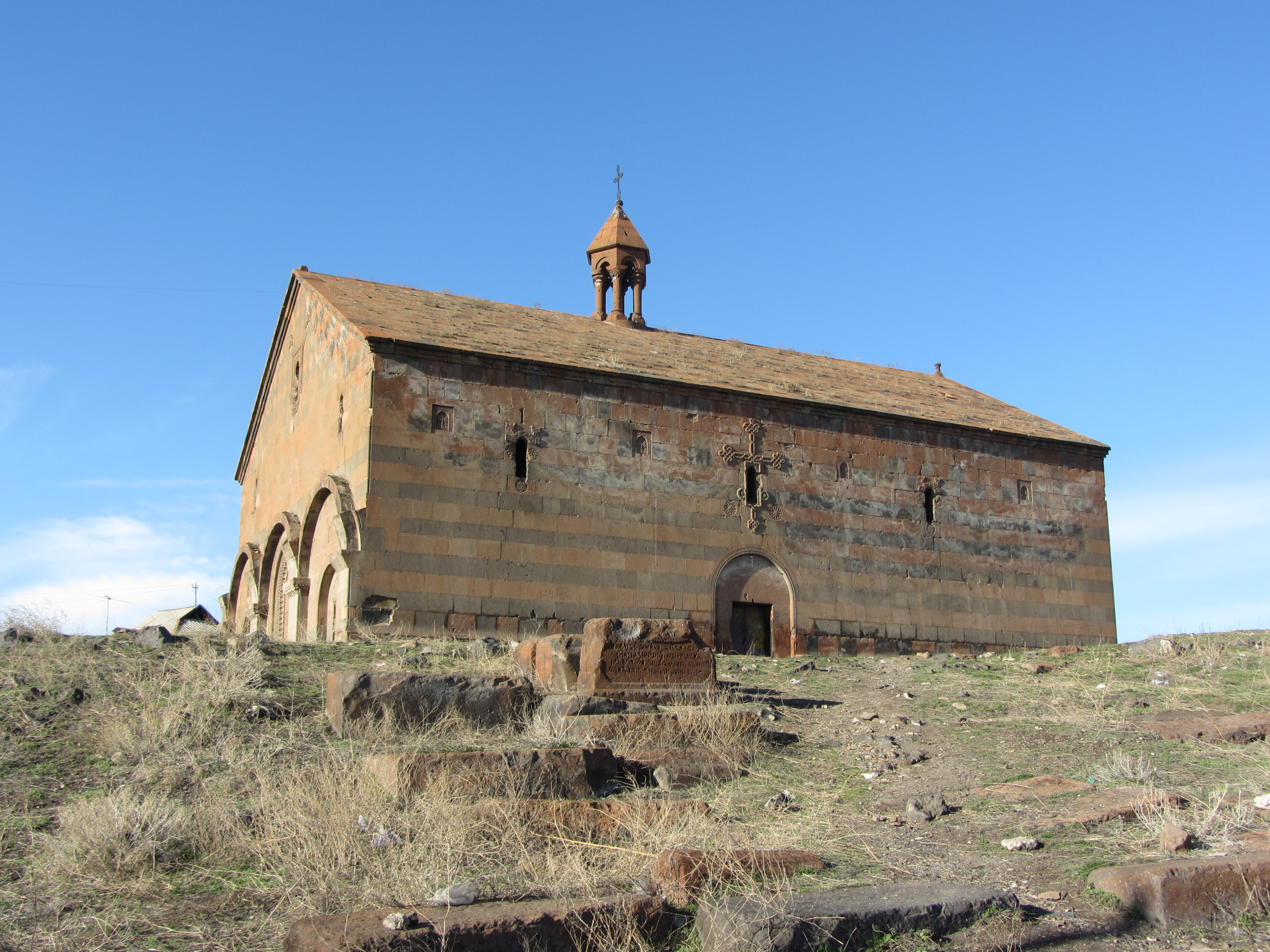
Holy Mother of God Church of Kanaker

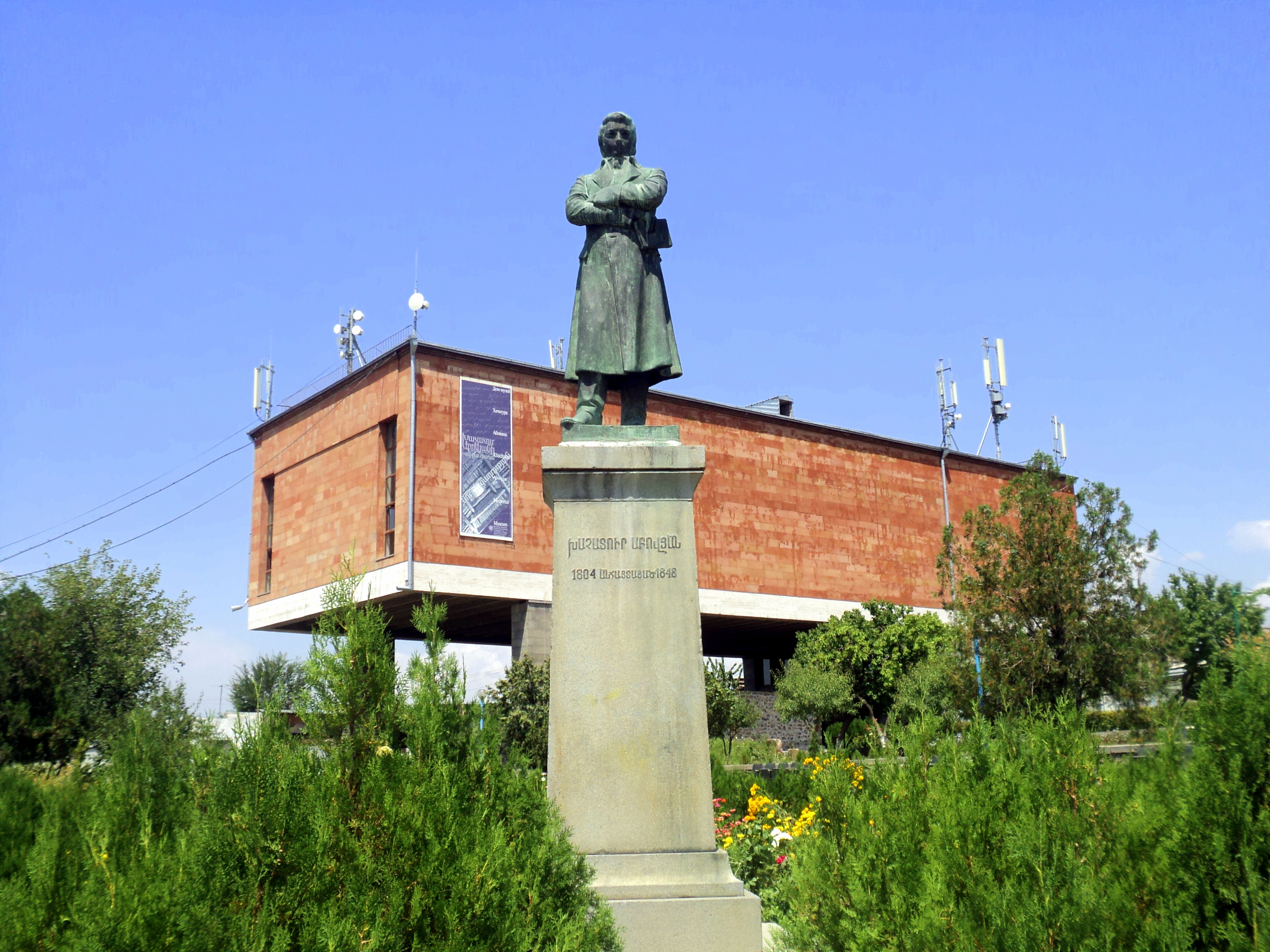
The House-Museum of Khachatur Abovian in Kanaker

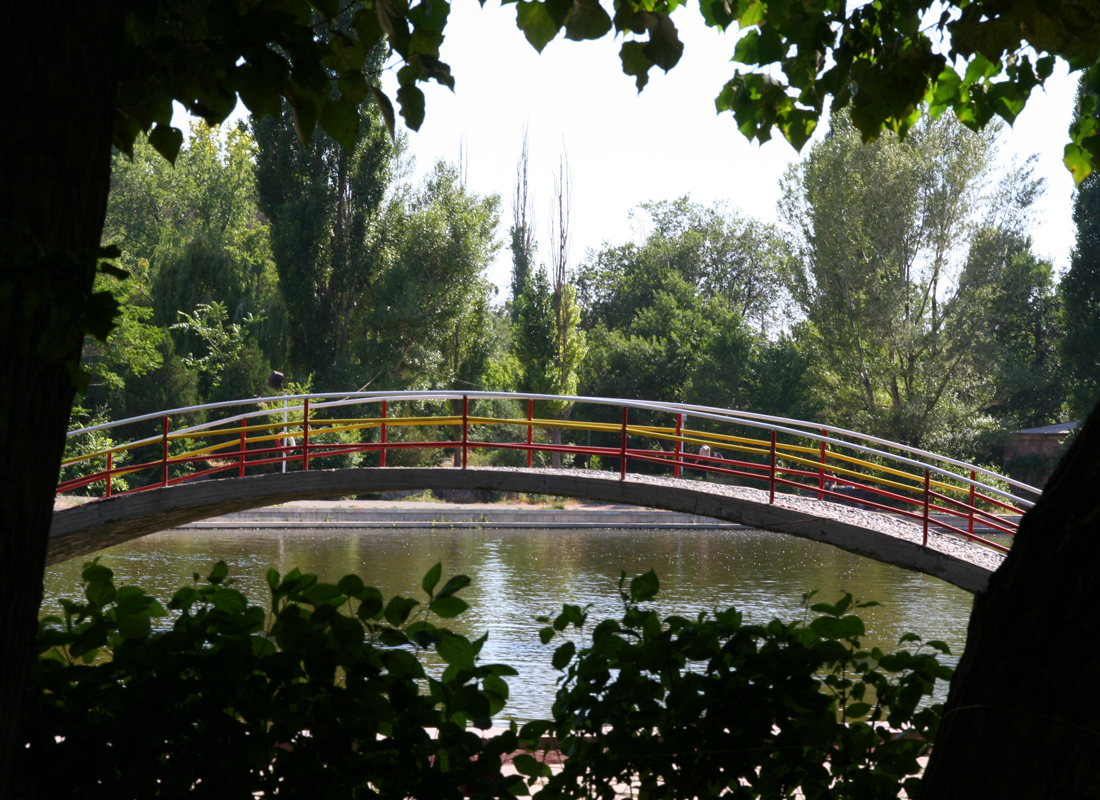
The Victory Park

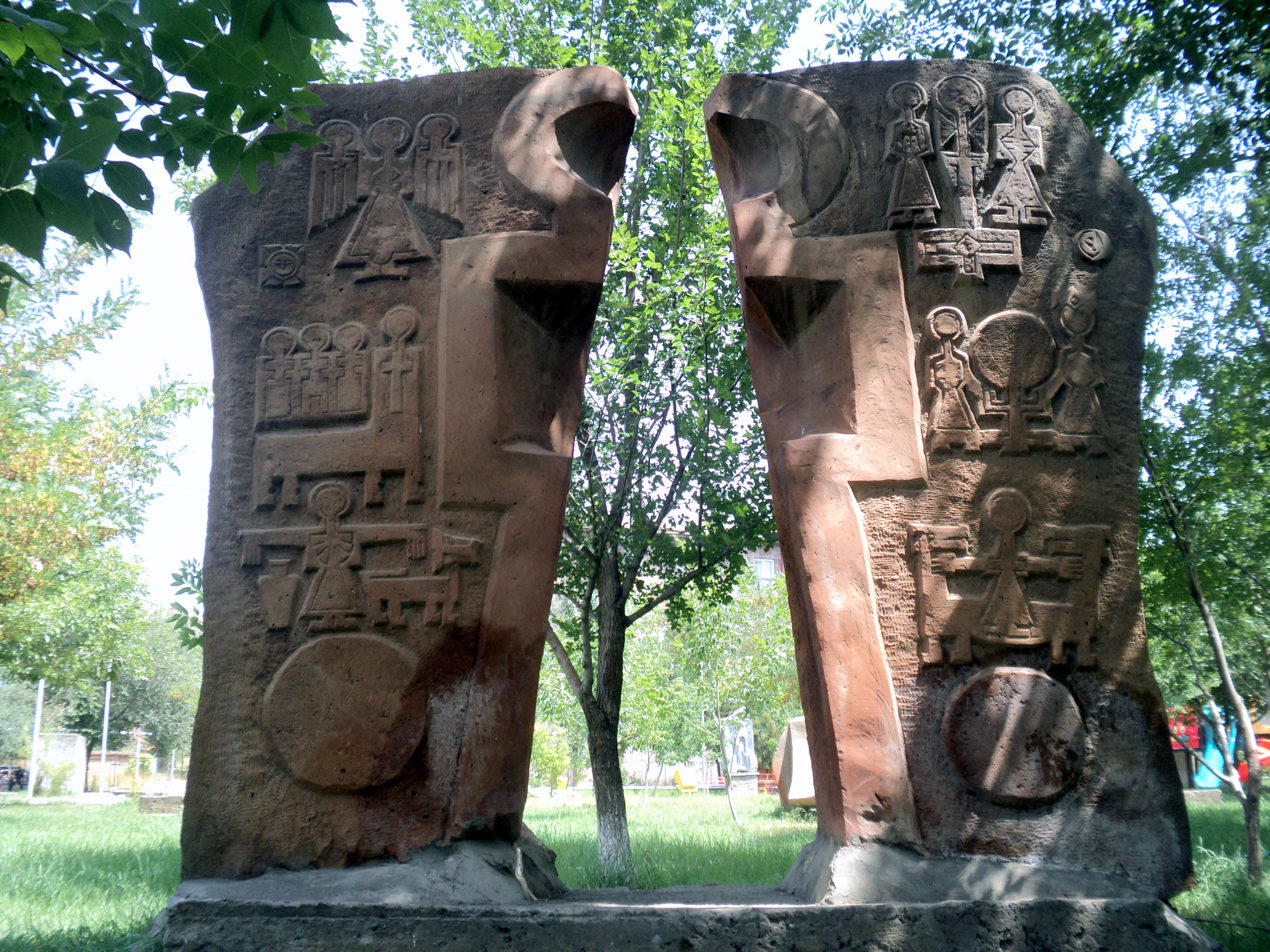
Memorial to the 1700th anniversary of Christianity in Armenia

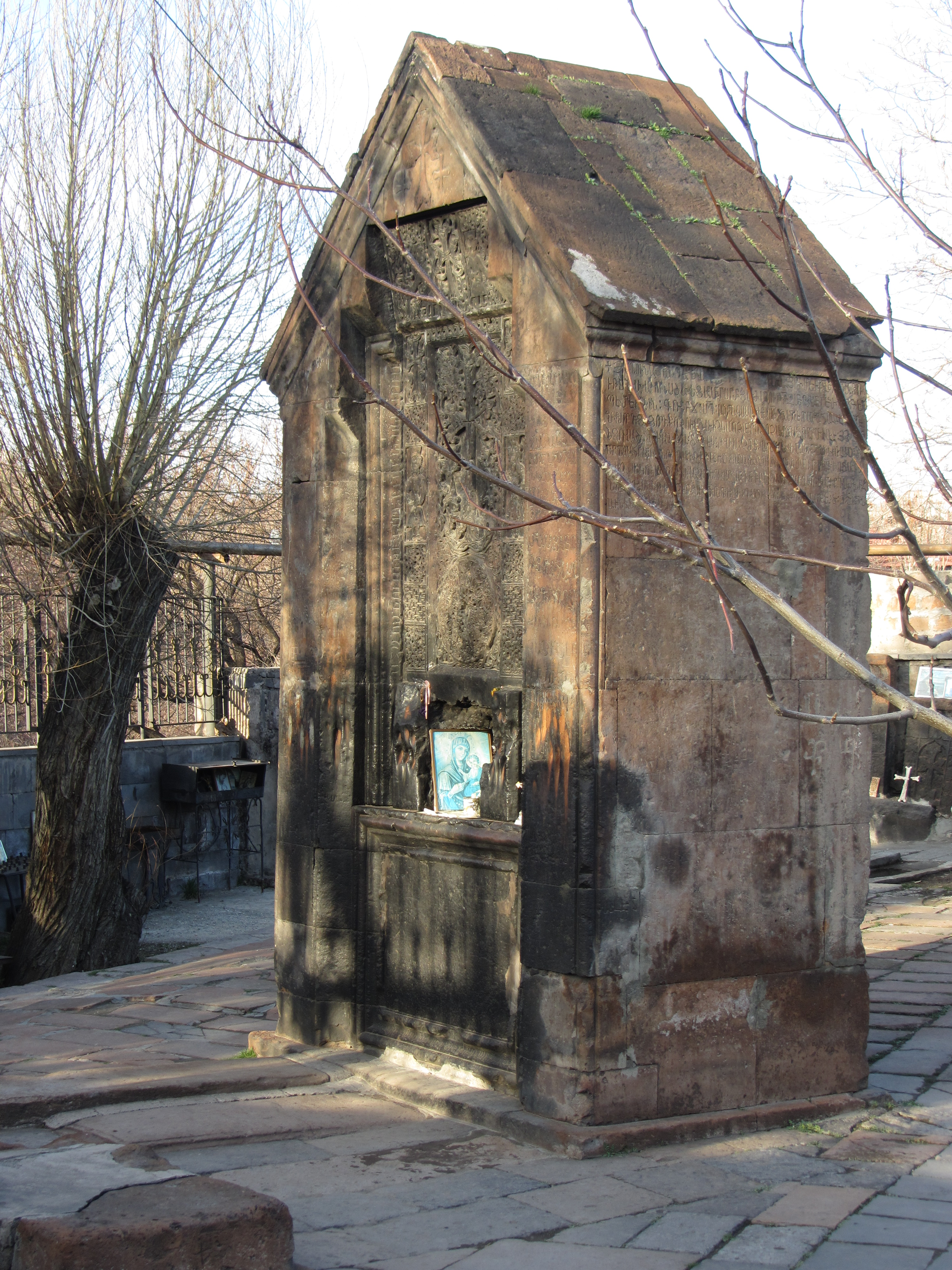
Amenaprkich (Holy Savior) Cross-stone or Gravestone of Petevan, Kanaker
