= Mother Armenia =

- Մայր Հայաստան (Armenian)
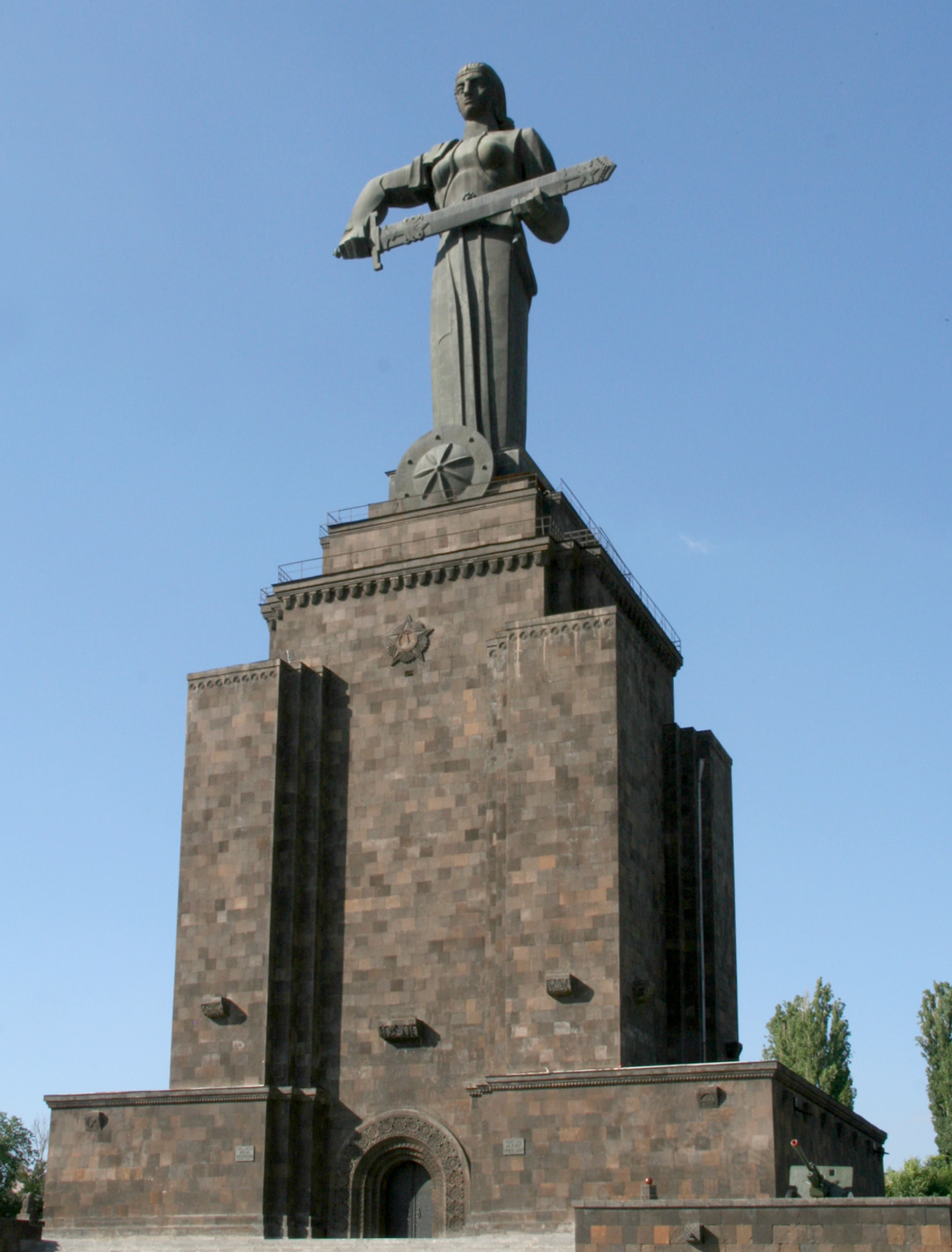
- Mother Armenia

- Location within Armenia
- 40°11′42.90″N 44°31′29.34″E
- Location: Victory Park, Yerevan, Armenia

History
- Built: 1967

Site notes
- Elevation: 51 m (167 ft)
- Architect: Rafayel Israyelian
- Sculptor: Ara Harutyunyan
- Governing body: Ministry of Defence of Armenia

Mother Armenia (Armenian: Մայր Հայաստան, romanized: Mayrig Hayastan) is a female personification of Armenia. Her most public visual rendering is a monumental statue in Victory Park overlooking the capital city of Yerevan, Armenia.

== Mother Armenia statue in Yerevan ==
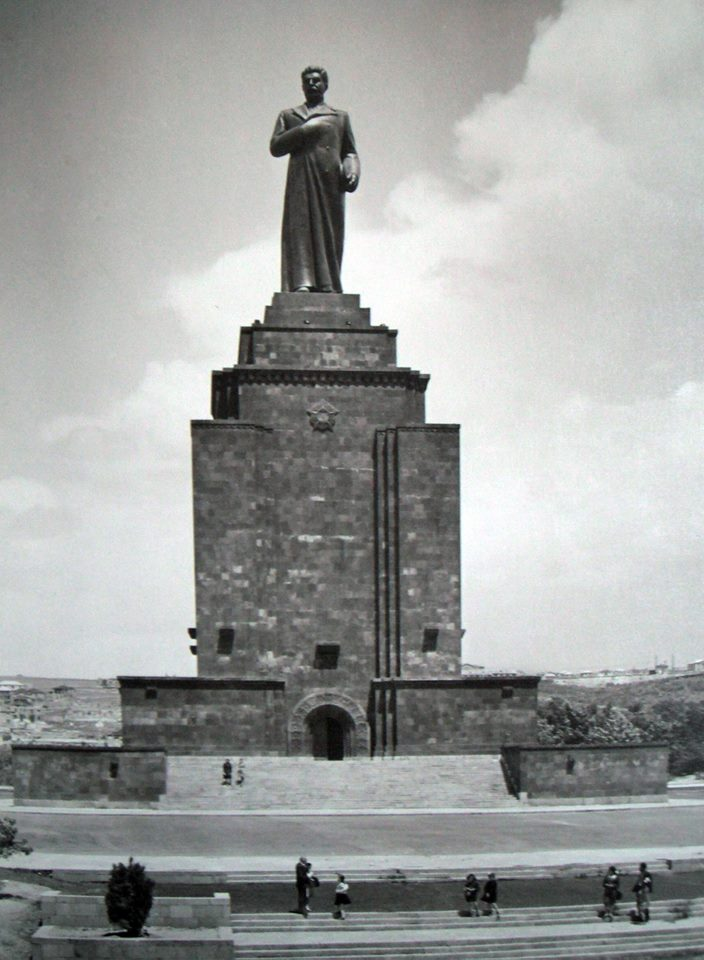
Original statue of Stalin, replaced in 1962 by Mother Armenia

The current statue replaced a monumental statue of General Secretary Joseph Stalin that was created as a victory memorial for World War II. During Stalin's government of the Soviet Union, Grigor Harutyunyan, the first secretary of the Armenian Communist Party's Central Committee, and members of the government oversaw the construction of the monument which was completed and unveiled to the people on 29 November 1950. The statue was considered a masterpiece of the sculptor Sergey Merkurov. It was one of the last important Stalin monuments still standing. Vasily Grossman found the statue to be one of the finest monuments of his time.

The pedestal was designed by architect Rafayel Israyelian. Realizing that occupying a pedestal can be a short-term honour, Israyelian designed the pedestal to resemble a three-nave basilica Armenian church, as he confessed many years later "Knowing that the glory of dictators is temporary, I have built a simple three-nave Armenian basilica". In contrast to the right-angled shapes of the external view, the interior is light and pleasing to the eye and resembled Echmiadzin's seventh-century St. Hripsime Church.

In spring 1962, the statue of Stalin was removed, with one soldier being killed and many injured during the process, and in 1967, the statue of Mother Armenia, designed by Ara Harutyunyan, was installed in its place.

The prototype of "Mother Armenia" was a 17-year-old girl Genya Muradian. Ara Harutyunyan met her at a store and persuaded her to pose for the sculpture.

"Mother Armenia" has a height of 22 metres (72 ft), thus making the overall height of the monument 51 metres (167 ft), including the pedestal. The statue is built of hammered copper while the pedestal-museum is of basalt.

== Symbolism ==
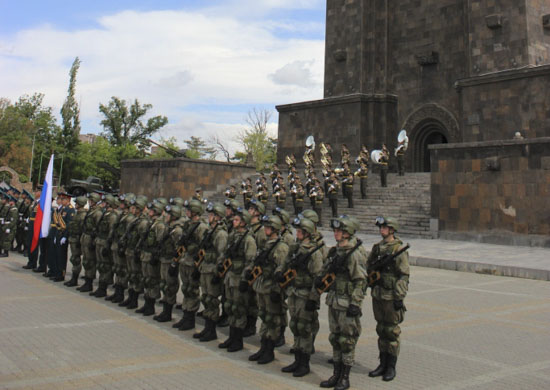
A military parade at the monument in 2018.

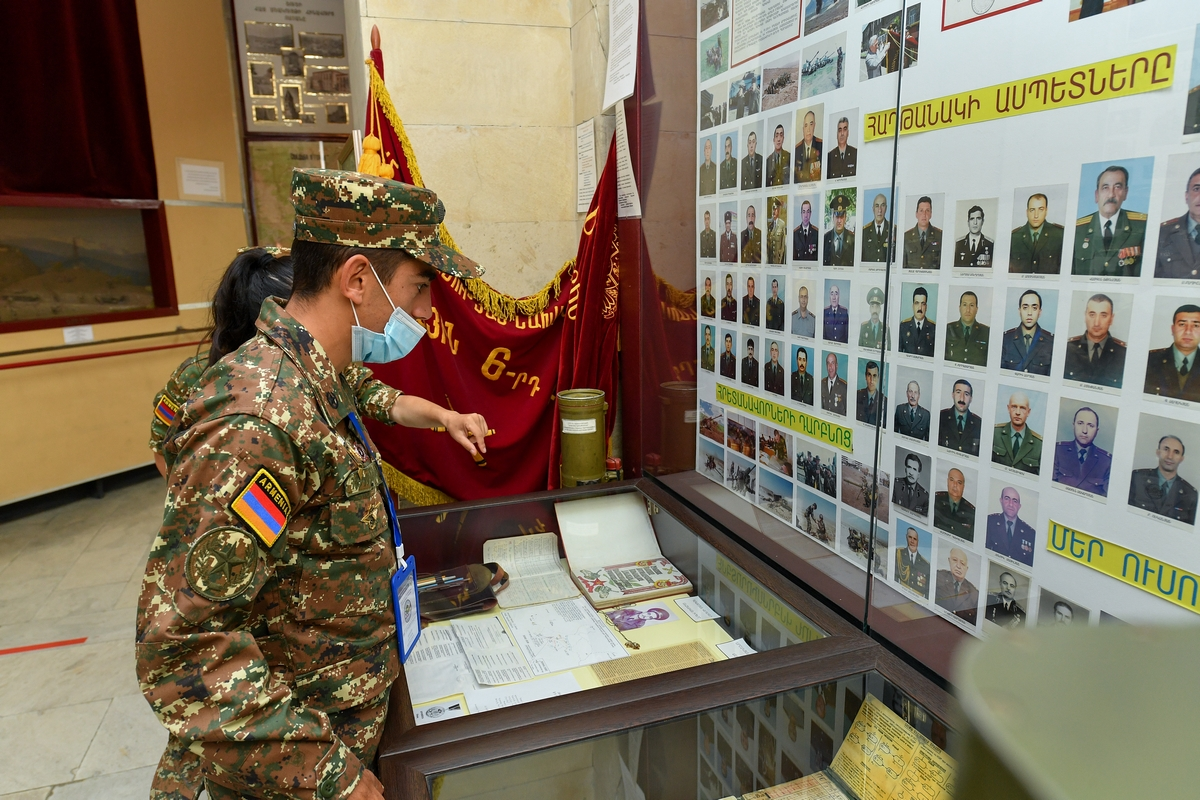
The museum interior.

The Mother Armenia statue symbolises peace through strength. It can remind viewers of some of the prominent female figures in Armenian history, such as Sose Mayrig and others, who took up arms to help their husbands in their clashes with Turkish troops and Kurdish irregulars. It also recalls the important status and value attributed to the older female members of an Armenian family.

Its location on a hill overlooking Yerevan makes it look like a guardian of the Armenian capital. Every year on 9 May, thousands of Armenians visit the statue of Mother Armenia and lay flowers to commemorate the Armenian martyrs of the Second World War. The pedestal hosts the Mother Armenia Military Museum of the Ministry of Defense. When first built it housed a military museum dedicated to World War II. Today, a large proportion of the exhibition space is devoted to the Nagorno-Karabakh War of 1988–1994. On display are the personal belongings, weapons, and documents of participants, and the walls are decorated with their portraits. Among other historical artifacts, there is a map on which Armenian forces worked out their campaign for the Battle of Shushi.

== Gallery ==
Mother Armenia

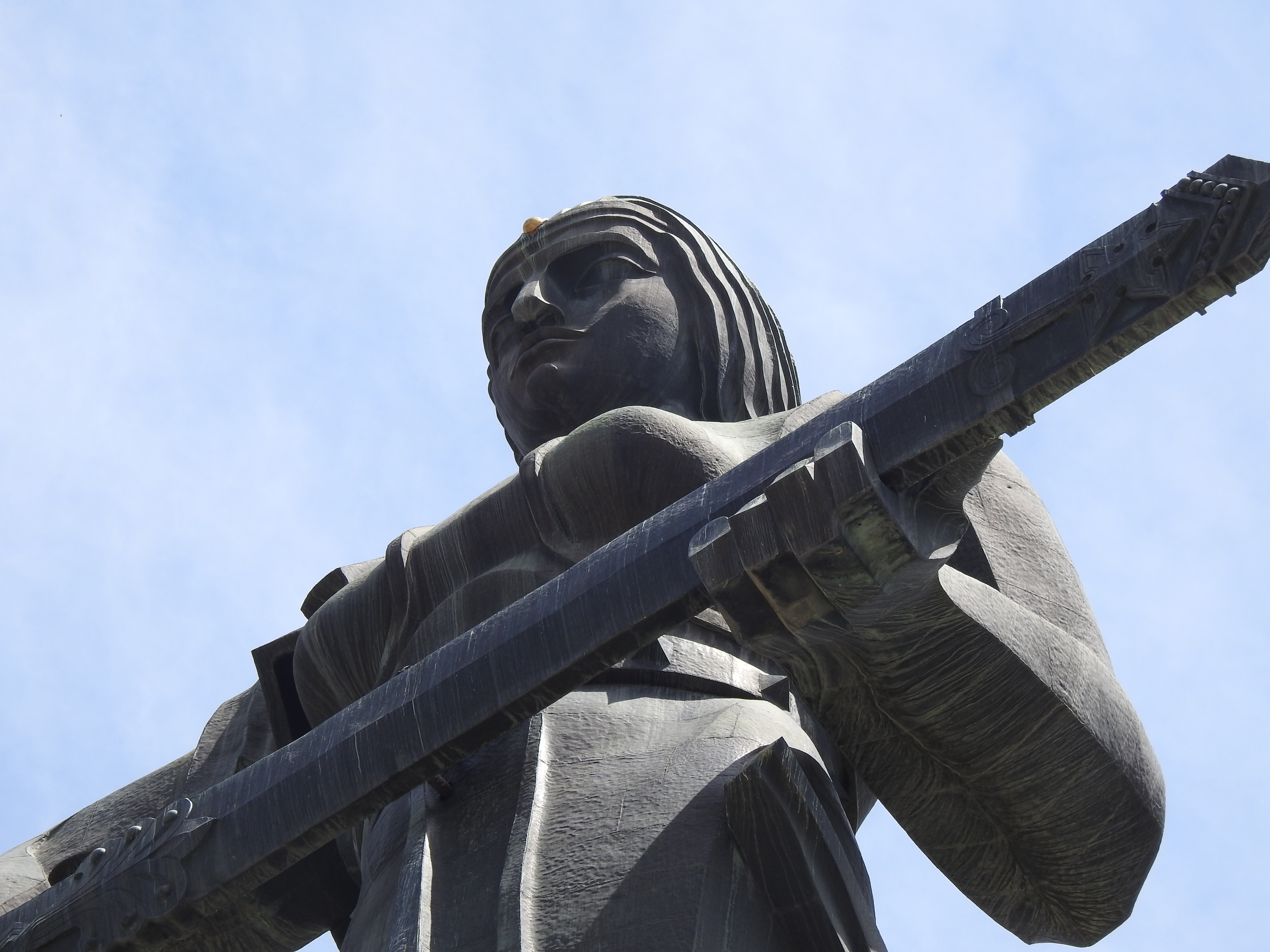
Edged forms of the heroic looking figure

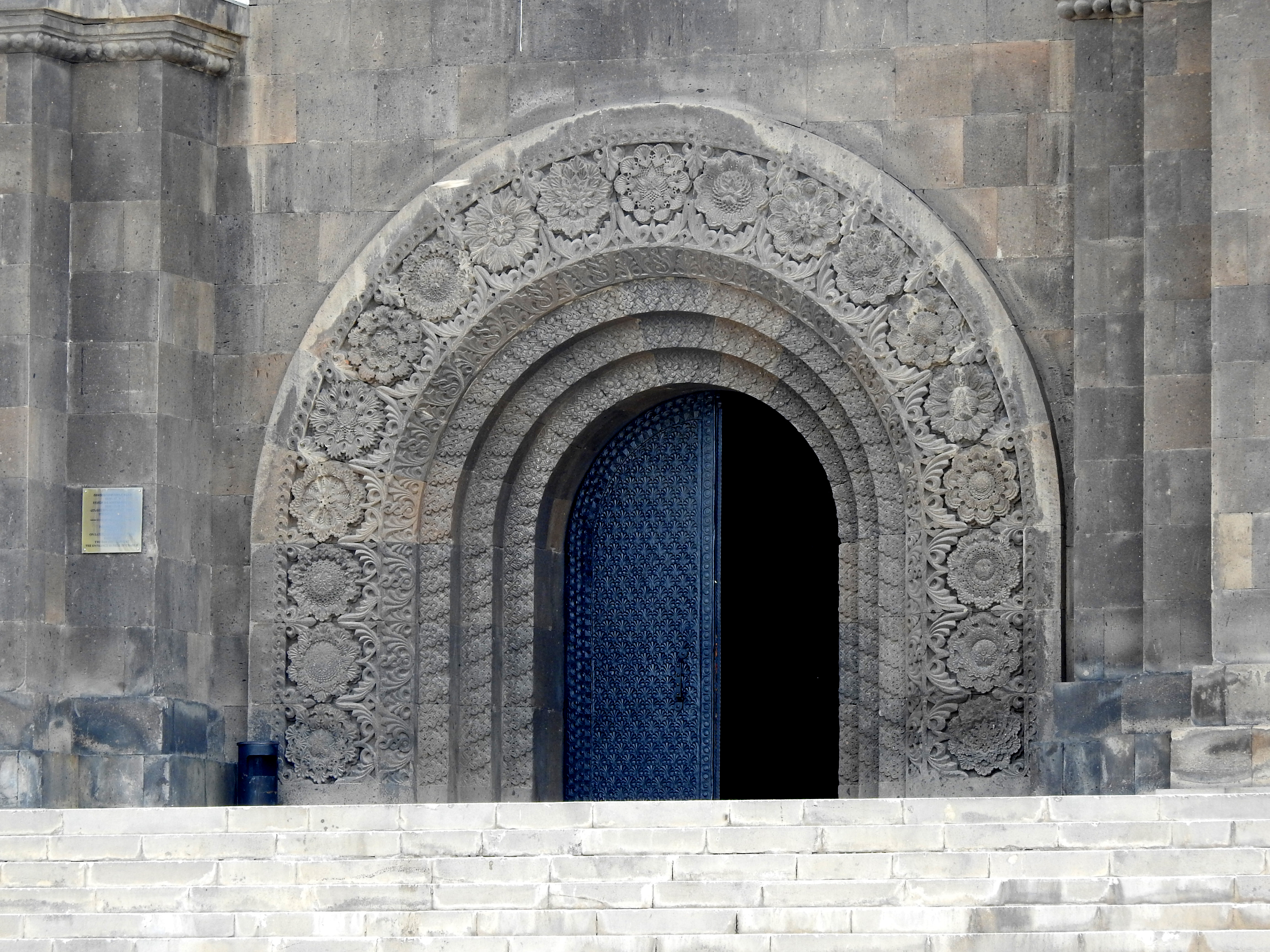
Entrance to the military museum in the base. Historical design as a stepped portal with filigree ornaments

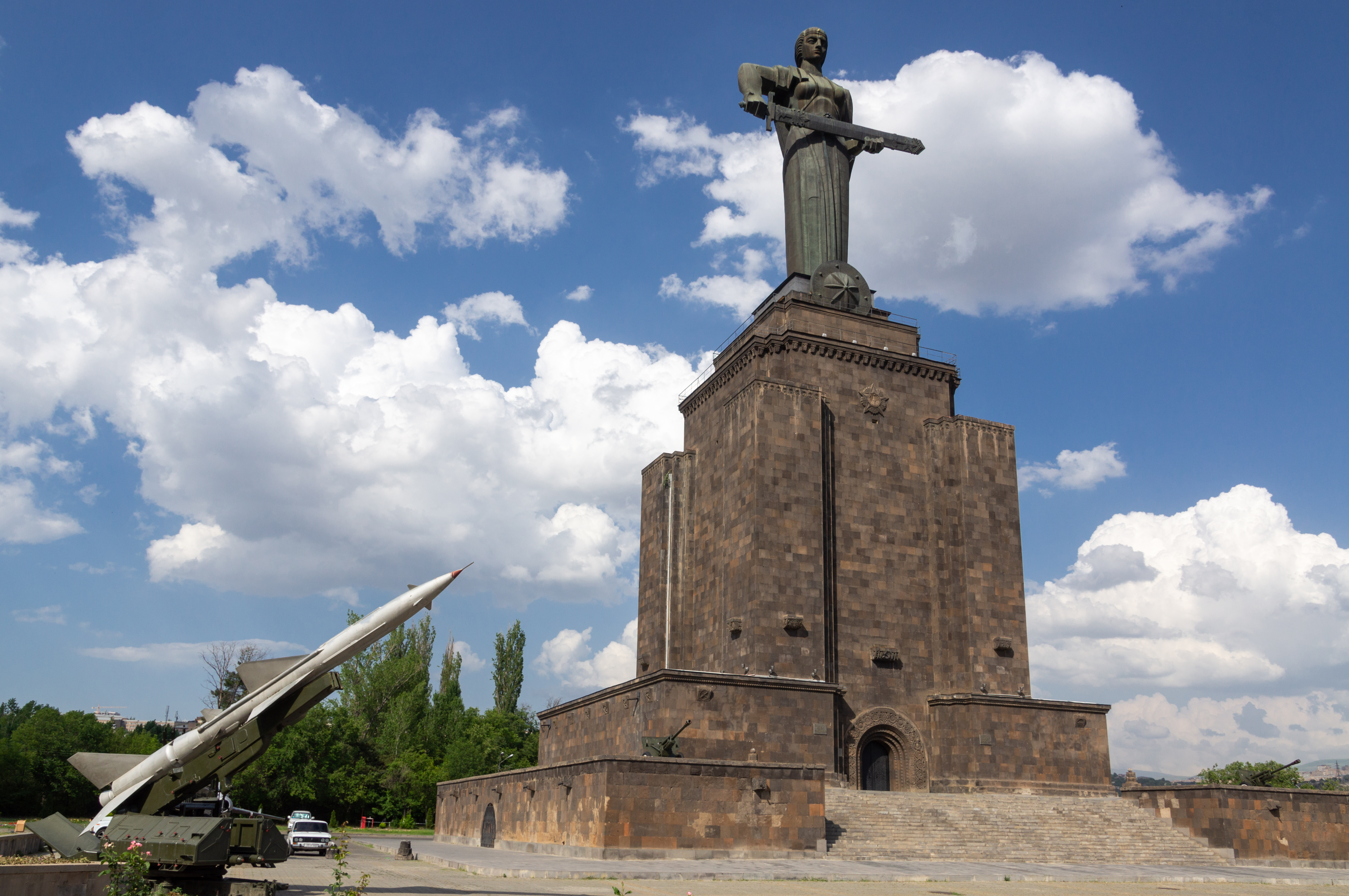
View of Mother Armenia monument

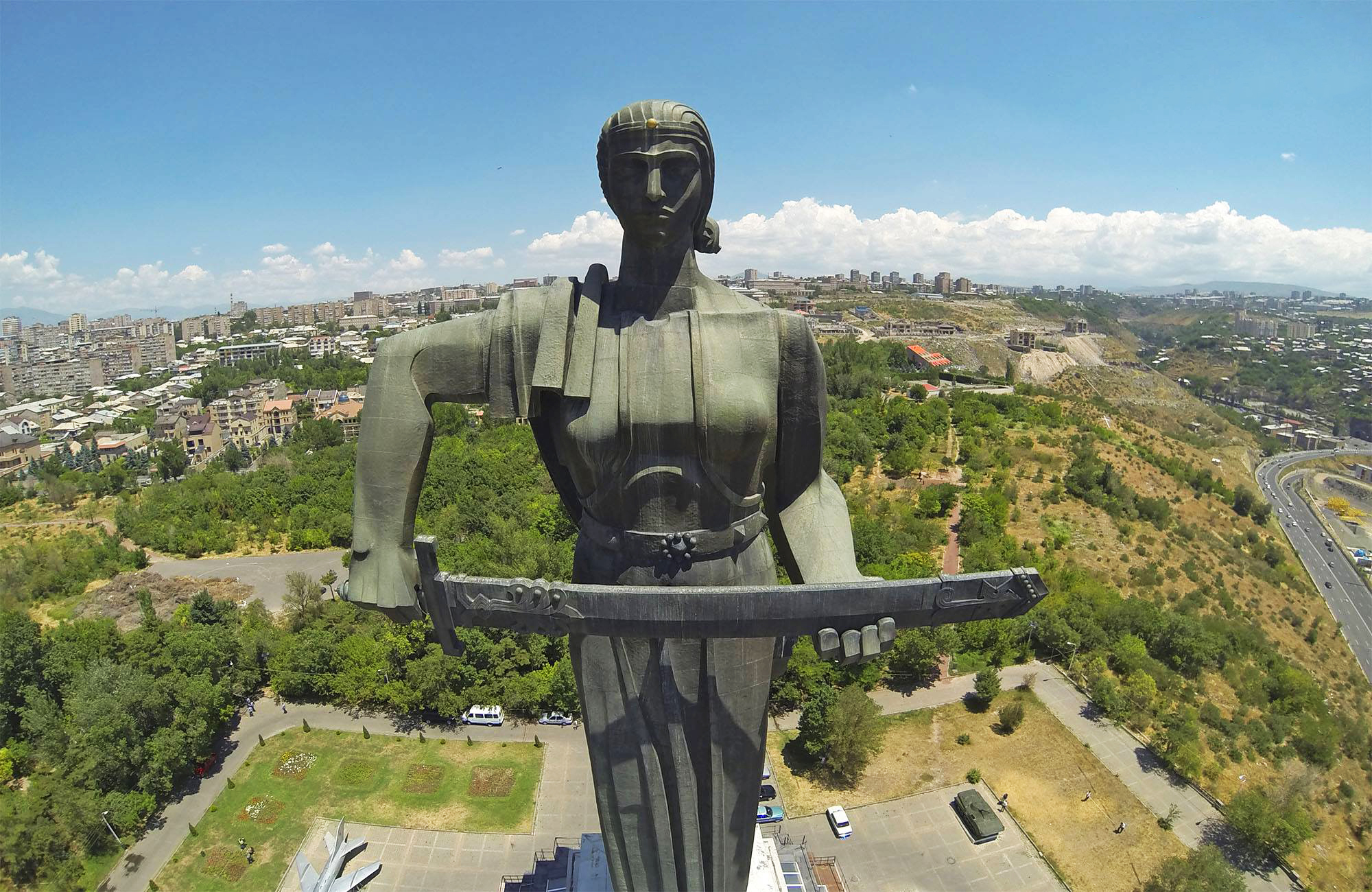
Aerial view

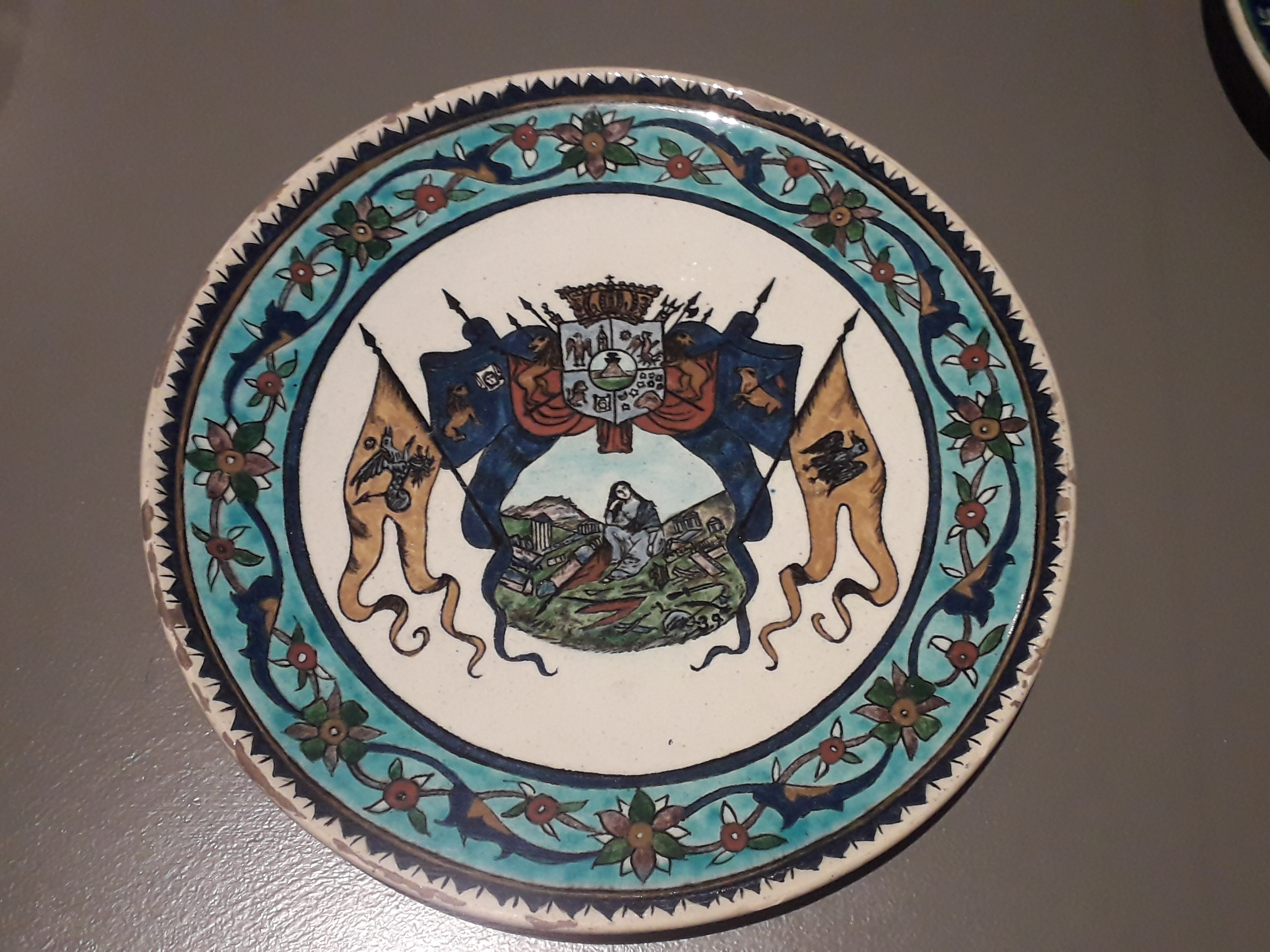
Mother Armenia mourning the destruction of ancient cities, Kütahya ceramic.

== See also ==
- List of tallest statues
- Kartlis Deda
- Mother Ukraine
