= Nor Arabkir =

- Location within Armenia
- Coordinates: 40°12′01″N 44°29′39″E
- Country: Armenia
- Marz (Province): Yerevan
- District: Arabkir
- Time zone: UTC+4 ( )

Nor Arabkir (Armenian: Նոր Արաբկիր, also, Arabkir), is an upper middle class urban neighbourhood in Yerevan, the capital of Armenia. It is part of the Arabkir District of the city.
