= Shengavit =

Shengavit or Shengavit or Shinkovit or Shingaīt may refer to:

- Shengavit Settlement, 4th- to 2nd-millennium BC ruins of a town located in Yerevan, Armenia
- Shengavit District, part of Yerevan, Armenia
- Nerkin Shengavit, part of Shengavit District
- Verin Shengavit, part of Shengavit District
- Shengavit (Yerevan Metro), a railway station
- Shengavit FC, a defunct football club
- Shengavit Medical Center, a hospital in Yerevan, Armenia
