= Charbakh =

Charbakh may refer to several things related to Yerevan, Armenia:

- Nerkin Charbakh, a neighborhood
- Verin Charbakh, a neighborhood
- Charbakh (Yerevan Metro), a railway station
- Charbakh Yerevan Futsal Club
