= Noragavit =

- Location within Armenia
- Coordinates: 40°07′05″N 44°28′31″E
- Country: Armenia
- Marz (Province): Yerevan
- District: Shengavit
- Time zone: UTC+4 ( )

Noragavit or Noragavit’ (Armenian: Նորագավիթ), is a neighbourhood within the Shengavit District of Yerevan, Armenia.
