= Hovik Hayrapetyan Equestrian Centre =

Equestrian and horse racing complex in Armenia

Coordinates: 40°8′42″N 44°26′57″E

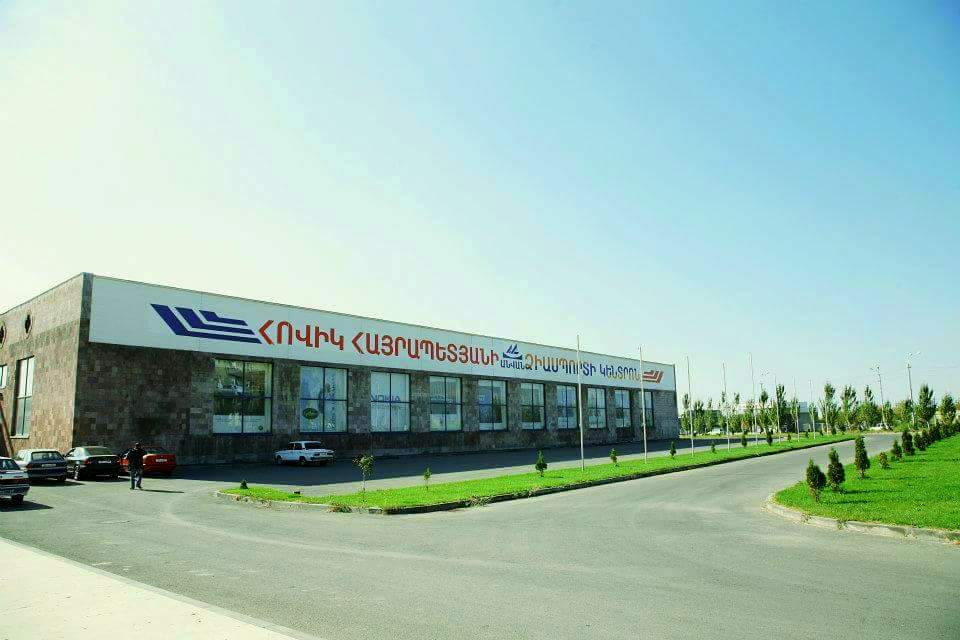
- Location: Shirak 39 st., Shengavit District, Yerevan, Armenia
- Owned by: Euromotors Ltd.
- Date opened: 2001

Hovik Hayrapetyan Equestrian Centre (Armenian: Հովիկ Հայրապետյանի անվան Ձիասպորտի Կենտրոն), is a large equestrian complex and horse racing hippodrome in Yerevan, Armenia, opened in 2001. The centre occupies an area of 85 hectares at the southern Shengavit District of the capital city.

== History ==
The Equestrian Sport in Armenia was founded in 1953 and is currently directed by the Equestrian Federation of Armenia (FEA), globally recognized by the International Federation for Equestrian Sports (FEI). With the increasing interest towards the equestrian sport in Armenia, the Hovik Hayrapetyan Equestrian Centre was founded in 2001.

The centre consists of an 1800 meters-long horse racing hippodrome, one outdoor and one indoor equestrian international competitions arenas. The centre is also home to the Jockey restaurant.

The centre is the regular venue for many domestic and regional competitions. Currently, it is the only equestrian centre in Armenia with an indoor arena.

The headquarters of the Federation of Equestrian sport of Armenia are located in the centre.
