= Garegin Nzhdeh Square =

Coordinates: 40°09′04″N 44°29′00″E

- Գարեգին Նժդեհի Հրապարակ (Armenian)
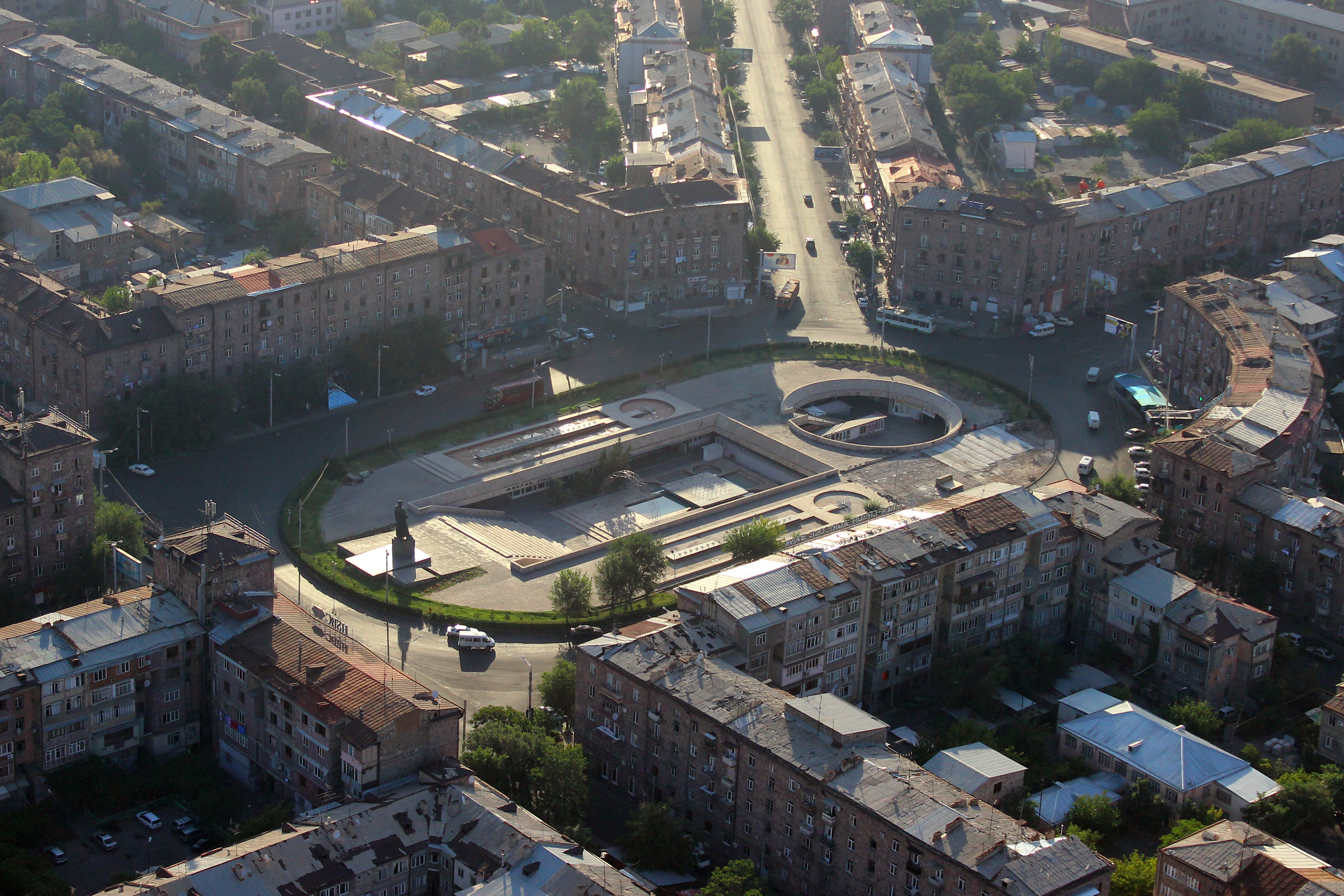
- Aerial view of the Garegin Nzhdeh Square
- Interactive map of Garegin Nzhdeh Square
- Location: Shengavit district Yerevan, Armenia

History
- Built: opened on 30 April 1959

Site notes
- Area: 17,500 m^{2} (188,000 sq ft)
- Architectural styles: mix of Armenian and neoclassical
- Governing body: Yerevan City Council

Garegin Nzhdeh Square (Armenian: Գարեգին Նժդեհի Հրապարակ, romanized: Garegin Nzhdehi hraparak), formerly Souren Spandaryan Square (Armenian: Սուրեն Սպանդարյանի հրապարակ, romanized: Souren Spandaryani hraparak), is the second largest square in the city of Yerevan, Armenia. It is located in the Shengavit district, to the south of the city centre. The square is intersected by the following streets: Garegin Nzhdeh, Manandian, Yeghbayrutian and Bagratuniats. The square was officially opened on 30 April 1959.

The statue of the Bolshevik leader Suren Spandaryan is erected in the square since 1990. The square was renamed after the Armenian National Hero Garegin Nzhdeh on 25 May 1991.

The metro station of Garegin Nzhdeh Square and the "Metro Theatre" hall are located underground the square.

== Gallery ==
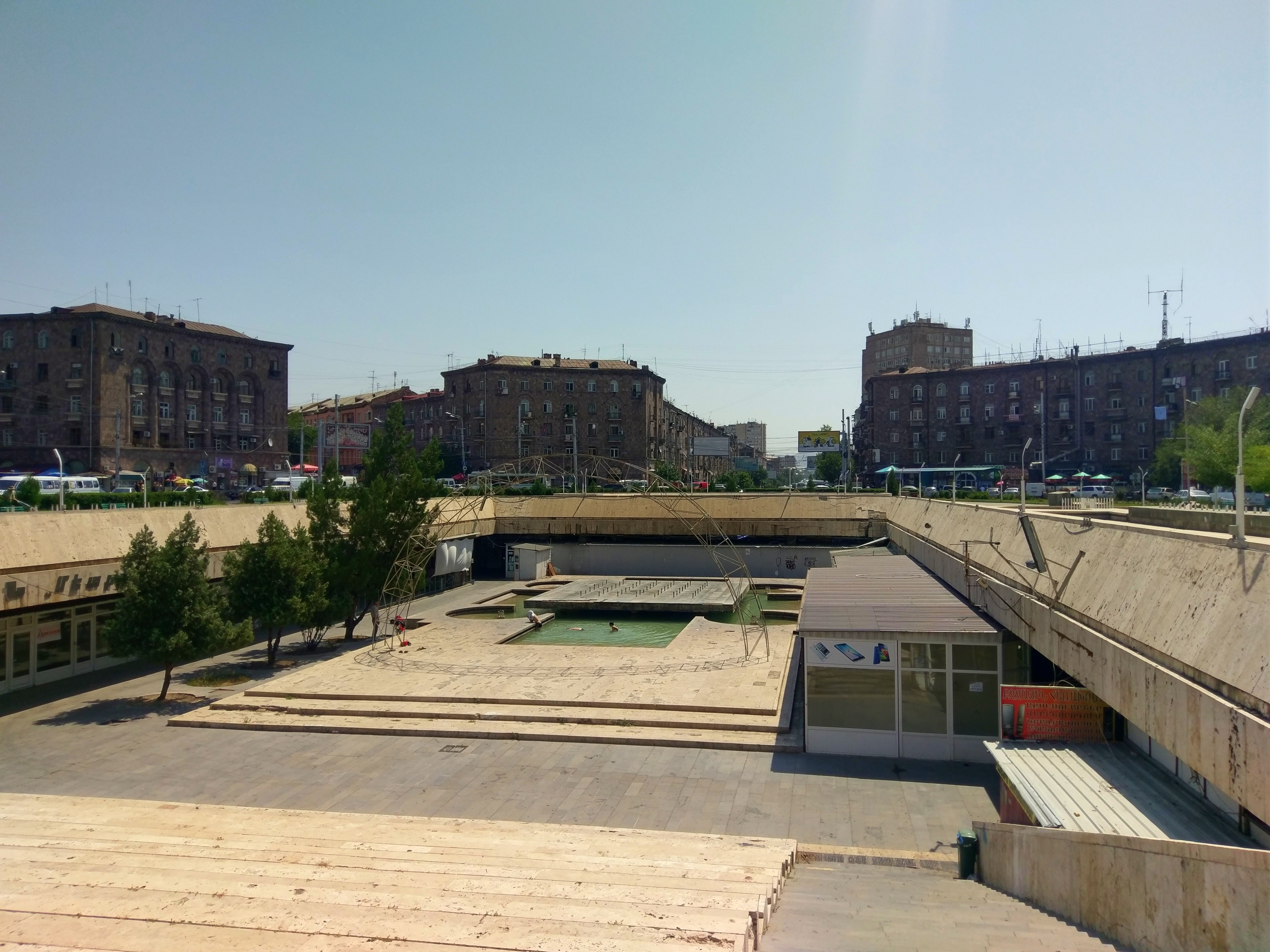
General view of the square

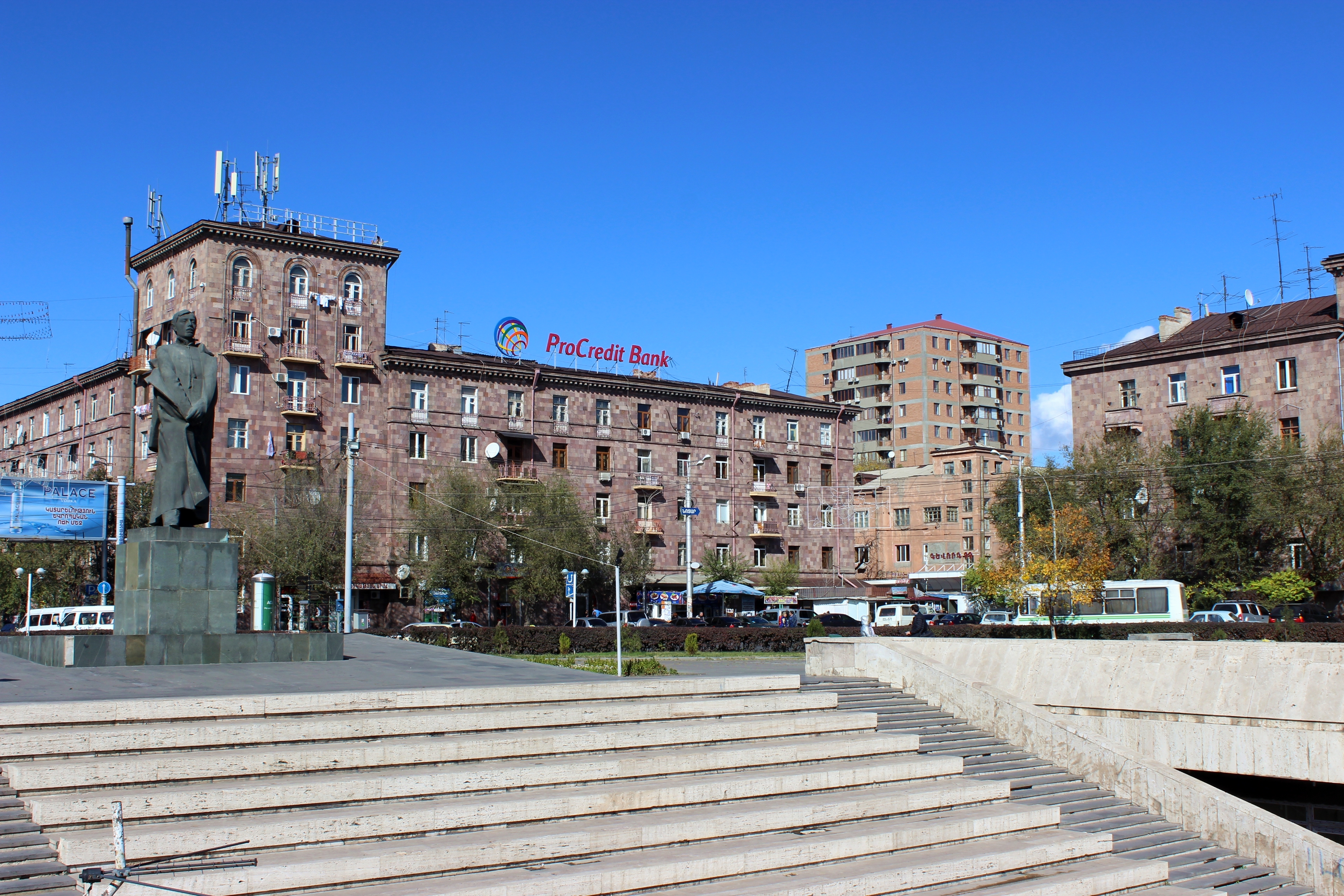
The entrance to the G. Nzhdeh Square metro station
