= Equestrian Federation of Armenia =

Sporting Organization

Equestrian Federation of Armenia logo

The Equestrian Federation of Armenia (Armenian: Հայաստանի ձիասպորտի ֆեդերացիա), also known as the Federation of Equestrian Sport of Armenia, is the regulating body of equestrian sports in Armenia, governed by the Armenian Olympic Committee. The headquarters of the federation is located in Yerevan.

== History ==
The Federation was established in 1953 and the current president is Hayrapet Hayrapetyan. The Federation is a full member of the International Federation for Equestrian Sports.

On 19 September 2012, the Federation signed a cooperation agreement with the French equestrian company PMU during a ceremony held at the Hovik Hayrapetyan Equestrian Centre. The Federation oversees a horse racing hippodrome at the Hovik Hayrapetyan Equestrian Centre.

== See also ==
- Equestrianism
- List of equestrian sports
- Sport in Armenia
