= Komitas Museum =

Coordinates: 40°09′44″N 44°30′08″E

Komitas Museum-Institute
- Կոմիտասի թանգարան-ինստիտուտ
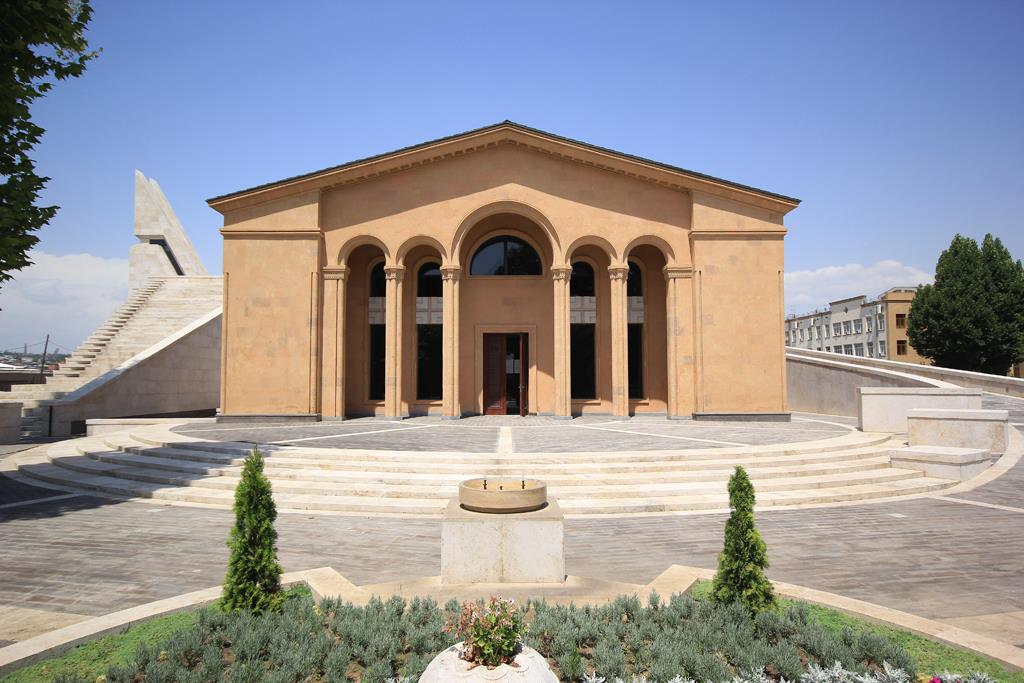
- The Komitas Museum near the Komitas Pantheon
- Established: 2015
- Location: Arshakunyats Avenue, Yerevan, Armenia
- Type: biographical and art museum
- Director: Nikolay Kostandyan
- Website: official website

Officially, Komitas Museum-Institute (Armenian: Կոմիտասի թանգարան-ինստիտուտ) is an art and biographical museum in Yerevan, Armenia, devoted to the renowned Armenian musicologist and composer Komitas. It is located adjacent to the pantheon at the Komitas Park of Shengavit district. The museum was opened in January 2015.

== Museum ==
By the 24 July 2014 decision of the government of Armenia, the Komitas Museum-Institute was founded as a non-commercial institution. It was built in the Komitas Park, replacing the old house of culture. The construction was financed by the "Pyunik" and "Luys" foundations. The architect of the project is Arthur Meschian. The museum-institute was officially opened on 29 January 2015, with the presence of president Serzh Sargsyan, Catholicos of All Armenians Karekin II and Catholicos of Cilicia Aram I.

The museum consists of a large concert hall, permanent and temporary exhibition halls and sections, research centre, music studio, library and publishing house. Komitas Vardapet's personal belongings are grouped in the museum. The life and work of Komitas, activities related to his musical and religious careers along with his rich heritage of researches in Armenian folkloric music, are permanently exhibited in eight sections of the museum. The project is composed and curated by Vardan Karapetyan and photographer Alberto Torsello. It is implemented by the International Council of Museums.

=== Exhibition halls ===
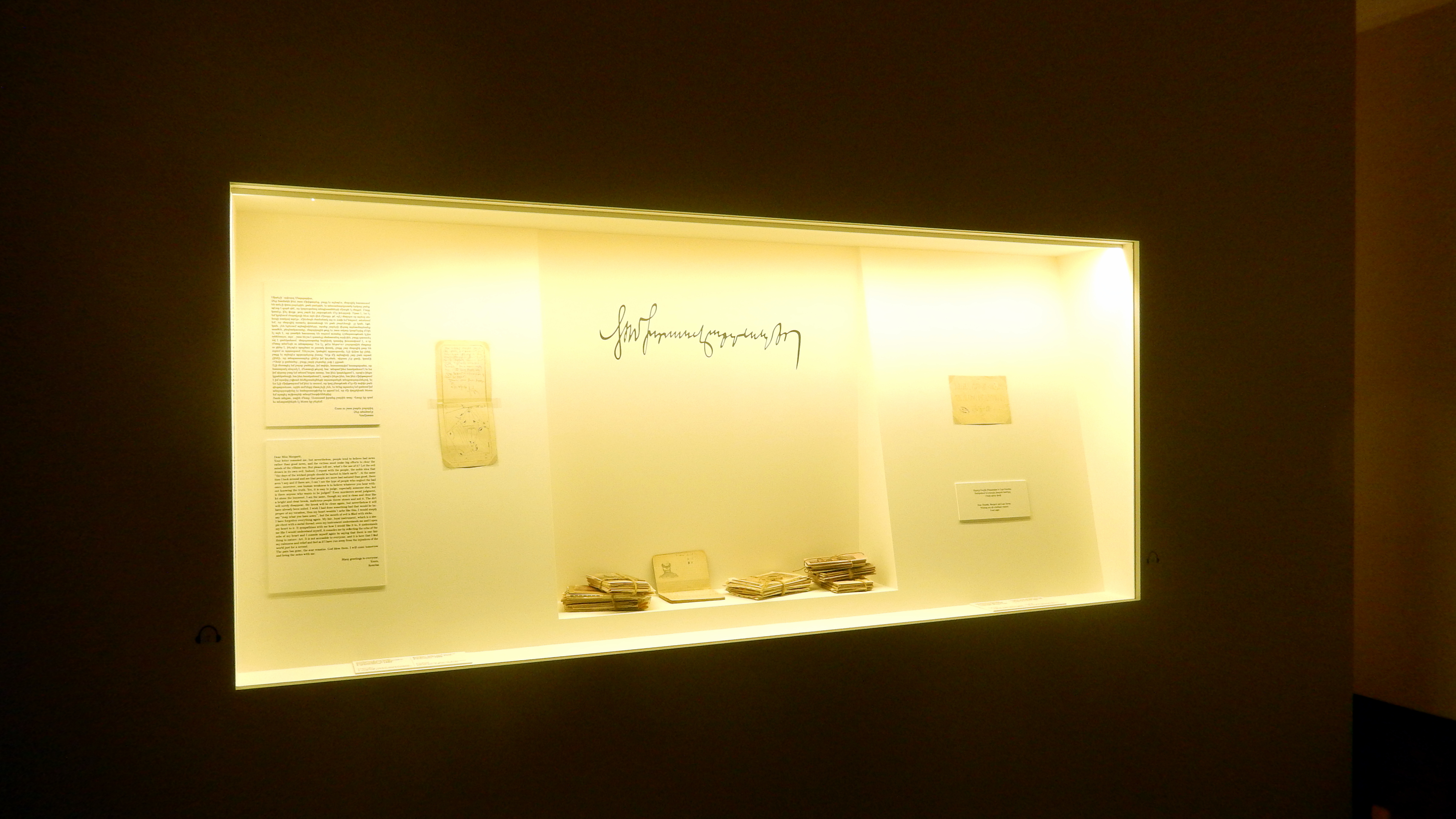
Komitas' signature

- 1st hall, "Chronology": dedicated to the life of Komitas.
- 2nd hall, "Komitas and his contemporaries": about the way that Komitas passed through, with the scientific thoughts and religious values of his partners.
- 3rd hall, "Thoughts of Komitas".
- 4th hall, "The works of Komitas in folkloric research".
- 5th hall, "Komitas as a composer".
- 6th hall, "Komitas and the ritual music".
- 7tg hall, "The performances of Komitas".
- 8th hall, "Legacy of Komitas".

== Gallery ==
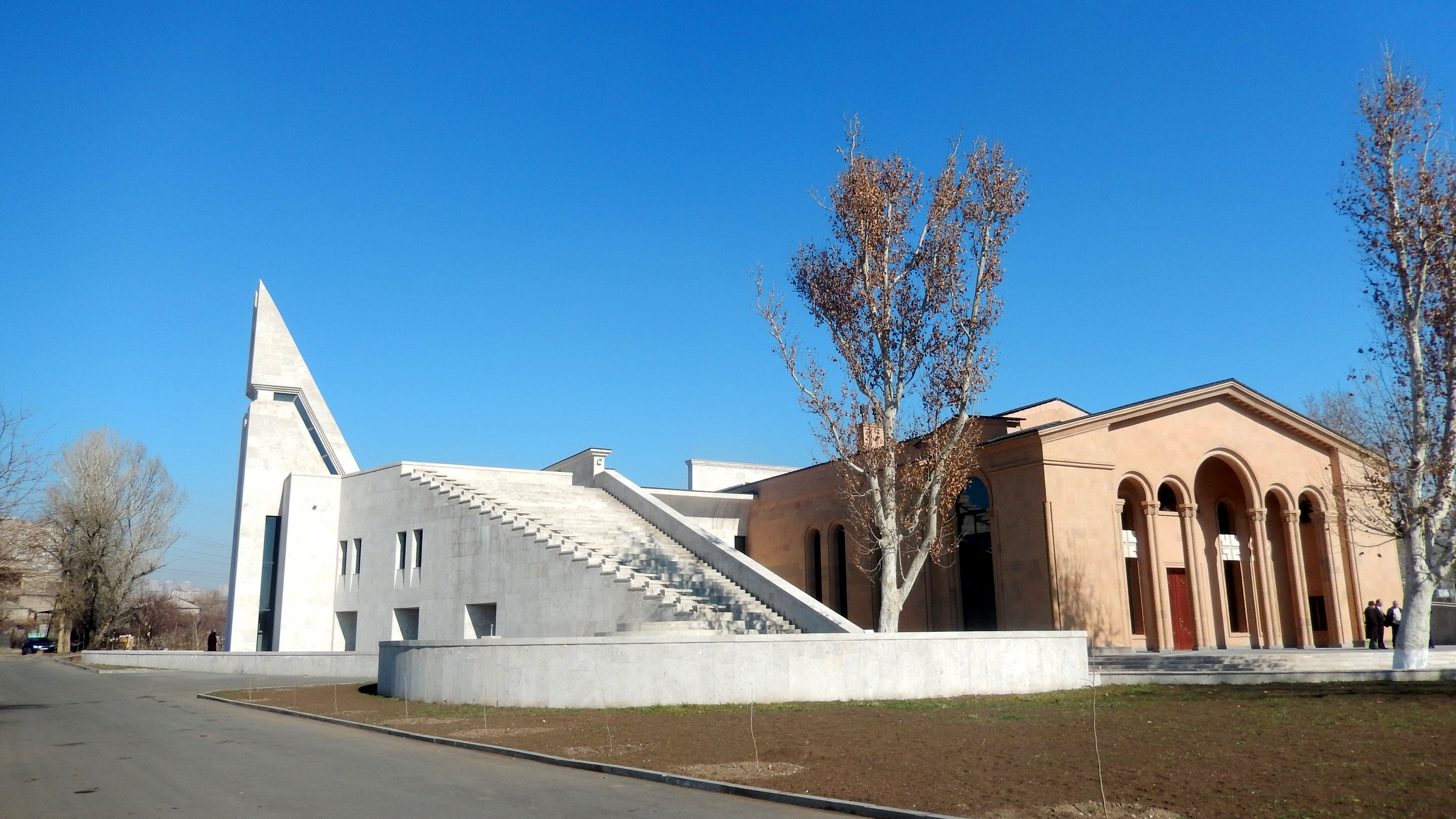
General view

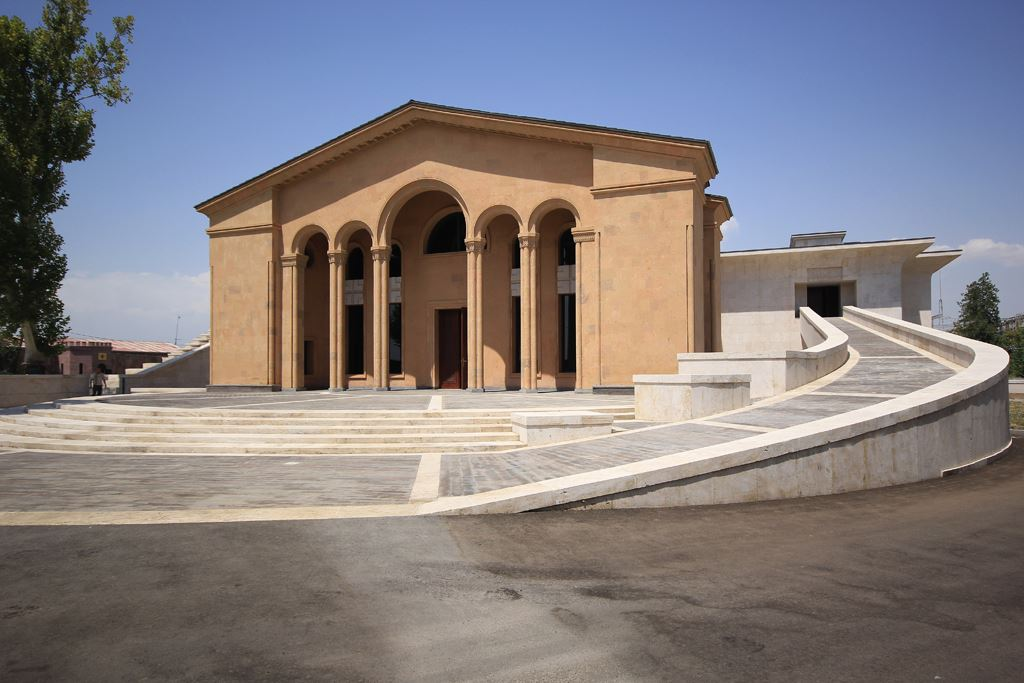
The entrance

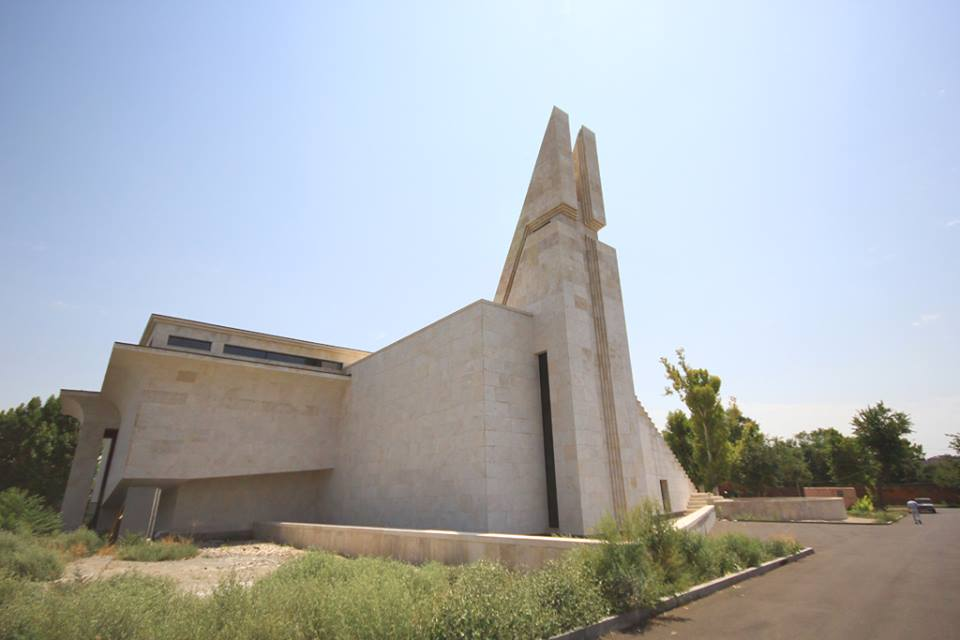
Backside view

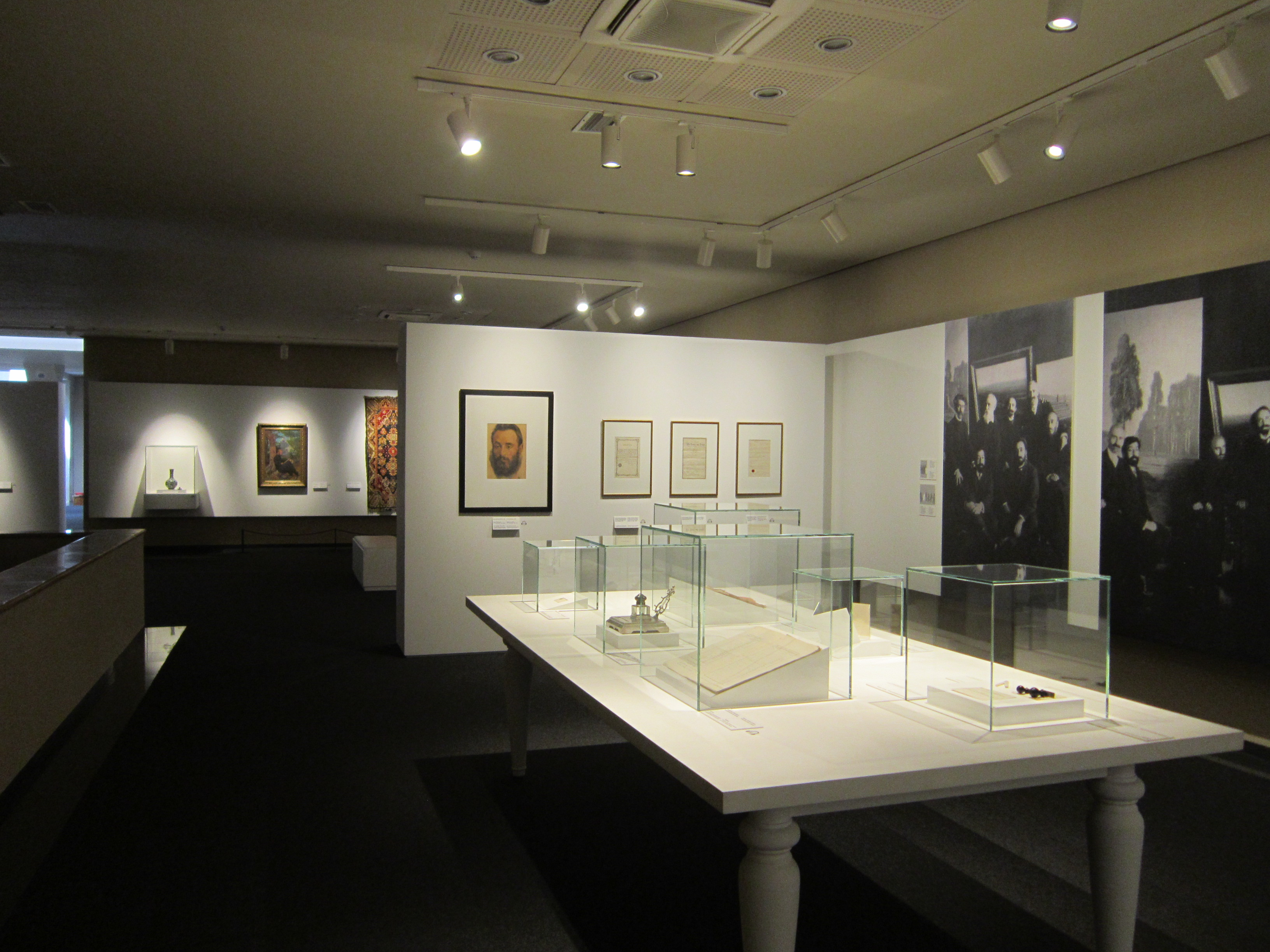
Internal view
