= Shoghakat TV =

Shogkahat TV Շողակաթ
- Country: Armenia
- Headquarters: Yerevan

Programming
- Picture format: 4:3 576i SDTV

Ownership
- Owner: Armenian Apostolic Church

History
- Launched: 2002
- Founder: Karekin II
- Closed: 1 January 2026

Links
- Website: shoghakat.am

Shoghakat TV (Armenian: Շողակաթ) was an Armenian television channel based in Yerevan, owned and operated by the Mother See of Holy Etchmiadzin, the regulating body of the Armenian Apostolic Church. The channel started broadcasting in November 2002 and closed on 1 January 2026.

== History ==
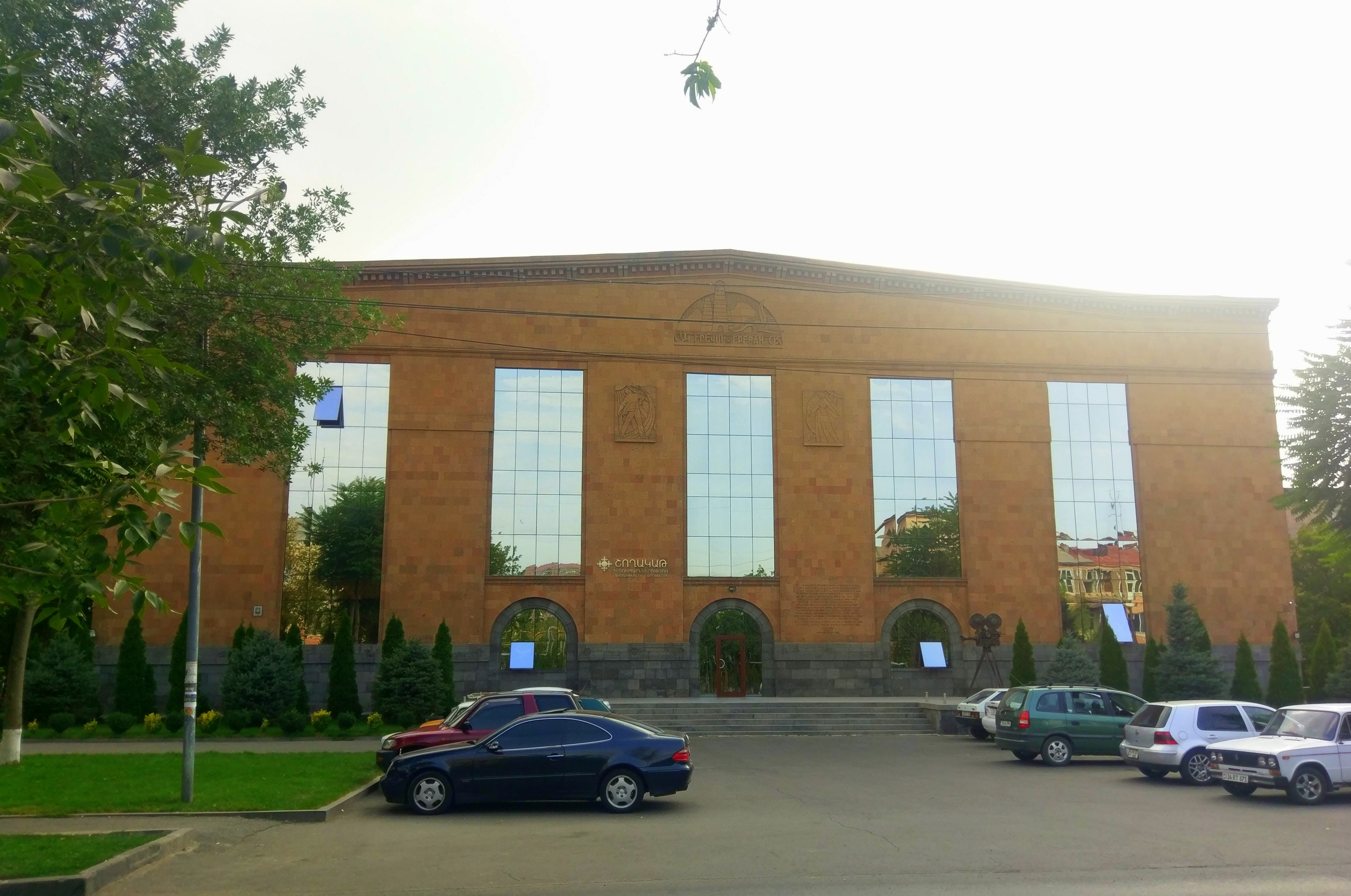
Shoghakat TV building in Shengavit District of Yerevan

The origin of the channel dated back to 1995, when a TV studio was opened in a small room within the prelacy building of the Araratian Pontifical Diocese, initiated by Catholicos Karekin II who was serving as primate vicar of the diocese at that time.

In 2002, Shoghakat TV received an official broadcasting license by the authorities of Armenia. The TV channel was released in order to illustrate the activities of the dioceses and also to promote the preaching of Armenian Apostolic Church. Programs and films produced by Shoghakat TV could be attained by other TV companies within Armenia, as well as through the Public TV of Armenia since 2004, for the diaspora Armenians.

The TV channel had been broadcast on air since November 2002. It had a viewership of over 1 million residents living in Yerevan and in most regions of the country.

Shoghakat TV produced and screened universal films about civilization, history, religion, nature, celebrities, global spiritual-cultural values, as well as covering public, economic, cultural, national-ecclesiastical events shown to the wide public via three dozen authorized programs. The viewers also had an opportunity to watch films and concert both of domestic and foreign production. Programs including sports and entertainment were also being broadcast.

The TV station was located in the Shengavit District of Yerevan, and the executive director was Mania Ghazaryan.

The channel closed on 1 January 2026, after the government announced the withdrawal of funding in October 2025. A decision to liquidate the company was taken on 25 December. Though cutting government waste was cited by officials, others noted that the governing Civil Contract party has been critical of the church.
