= Verin Shengavit =

- Location within Armenia
- Coordinates: 40°08′23″N 44°29′03″E
- Country: Armenia
- Marz (Province): Yerevan
- District: Shengavit
- Time zone: UTC+4 ( )
  - Summer (DST): UTC+5 ( )

Verin Shengavit (Armenian: Վերին Շենգավիթ, also, Verin Shengavit’, Verkhniy Shinkovit, Verkhniy Shengavit, Shinkovit, Shingaīt, and Shengavit) is a part of Shengavit District in Yerevan, Armenia.
