= Nerkin Shengavit =

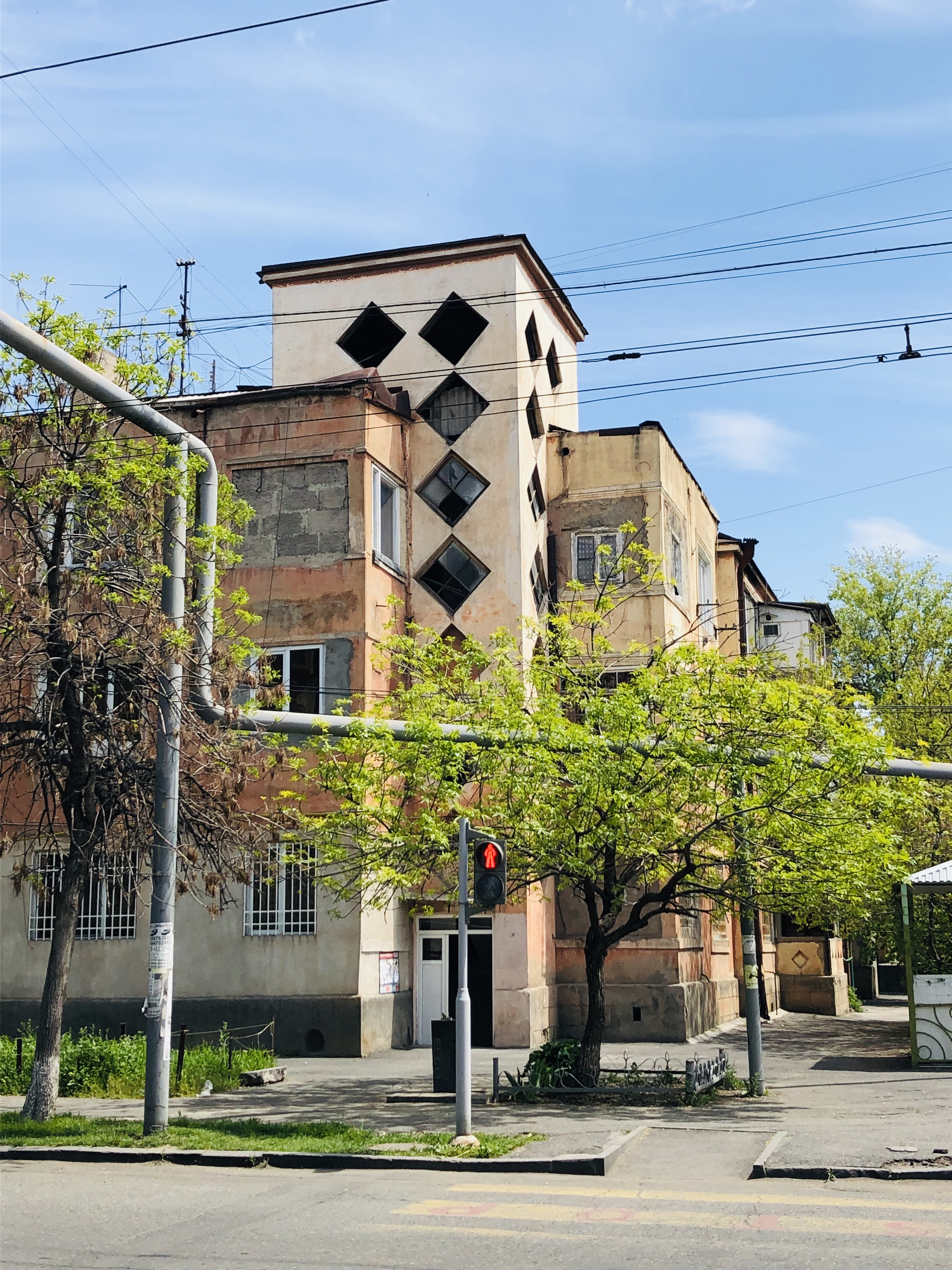

- Location within Armenia
- Coordinates: 40°08′02″N 44°29′03″E
- Country: Armenia
- Marz (Province): Yerevan
- District: Shengavit
- Time zone: UTC+4 ( )

Nerkin Shengavit (Armenian: Ներքին Շենգավիթ, also, Nerkin Shengavit’) is a part of Shengavit District in Yerevan, Armenia.
