= Verin Charbakh =

- Location within Armenia
- Coordinates: 40°08′20″N 44°27′01″E
- Country: Armenia
- Marz(Province): Yerevan
- District: Shengavit
- Time zone: UTC+4 ( )
  - Summer (DST): UTC+5 ( )

Verin Charbakh (Armenian: Վերին Չարբախ, also, Verin Ch’arbakh and Charbakh) is a part of Shengavit District in Yerevan, Armenia.
