= Shengavit District =

District in Yerevan, Armenia

Shengavit Շենգավիթ
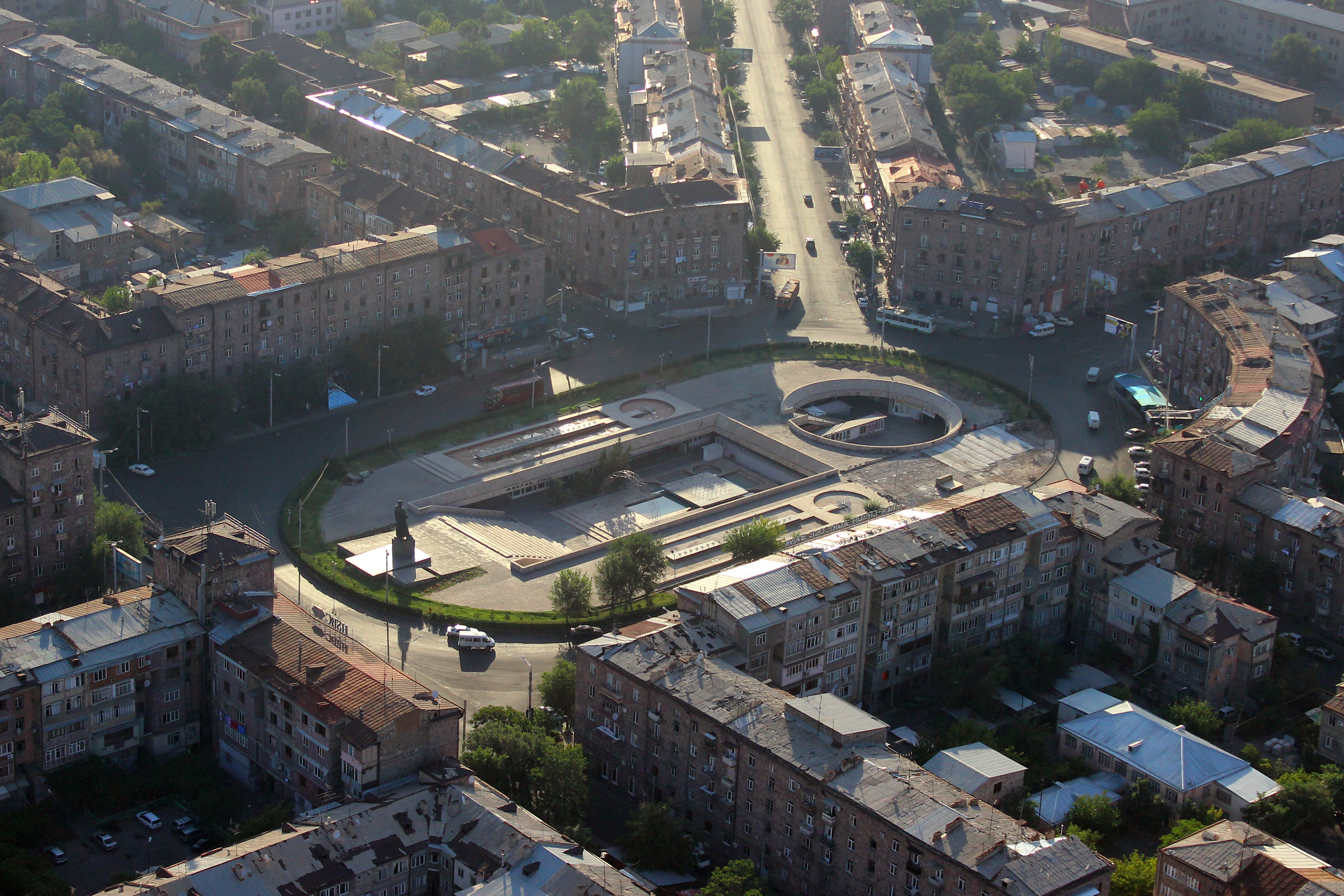
- Garegin Nzhdeh Square of Shengavit

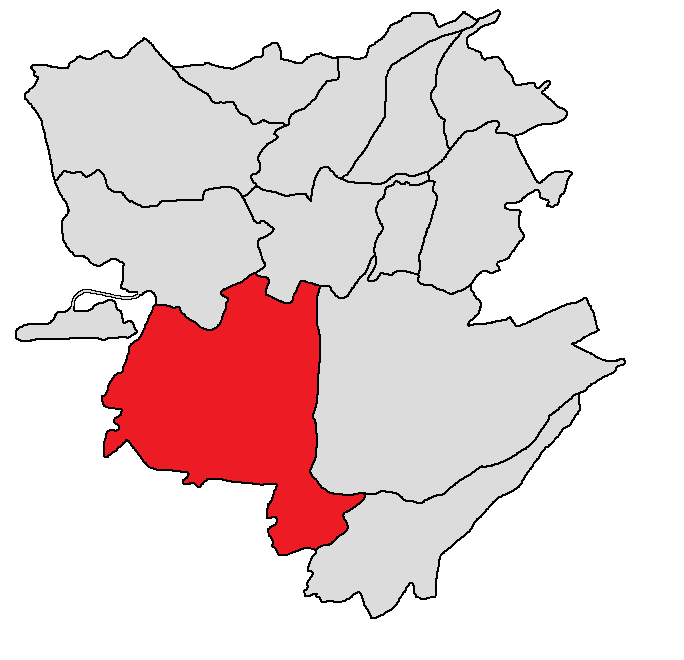
- Shengavit district shown in red

- Location within Armenia
- Coordinates: 40°08′23″N 44°29′03″E
- Country: Armenia
- Marz (Province): Yerevan

Area
  - Total: 40.6 km^{2} (15.7 sq mi)

Population (2022 census)
  - Total: 140,525
  - Density: 3,460/km^{2} (8,960/sq mi)
- Time zone: UTC+4 (AMT)

Shengavit (Armenian: Շենգավիթ վարչական շրջան, romanized: Shengavit’ varch’akan shrjan), is one of the 12 districts of Yerevan, the capital of Armenia, located at the low southwestern part of the city. It has common borders with the Yerevan districts of Malatia-Sebastia, Kentron (Center), Erebuni and Nubarashen. Ararat Province forms the southern borders of the district.

"Shengavit" is the historical name of the ancient settlement area and is composed of shen (Armenian "շեն" meaning "prosperous") and gavit ("գավիթ" meaning "parish"; "courtyard-like space"; also "narthex" in Armenian church architecture).

== Overview ==
Home to one of Armenia's most significant prehistoric sites - the ancient Shengavit settlement (an ancient town with fortress walls, metallurgy workshops, and complex religious systems - approximately 6000 years old), Shengavit can be called the "cradle of Yerevan" due to its deep historical roots.

Today with an area of 48.5 km^{2} (18.16% of Yerevan city area), Shengavit is the 2nd-largest district of Yerevan in terms of area. As of 2022, the population of the district is around 140,525.

It is unofficially divided into smaller neighborhoods such as Lower Shengavit, Upper Shengavit, Lower Charbakh, Upper Charbakh, Noragavit, Nor Koghb, and Aeratsia.

While in Soviet times, due its industrial focus, the district primarily served as a residential area for the working-class, there has been significant new residential construction in Shengavit, and the district is increasingly being seen as a more affordable alternative to neighbouring Kentron (Center). It has good transport connections. The large-scale "New Downtown" project in Noragyugh bordering Shengavit plans a direct road between Admiral Isakov Avenue and Arshakunyats Avenue.

== History ==
=== Antiquity ===
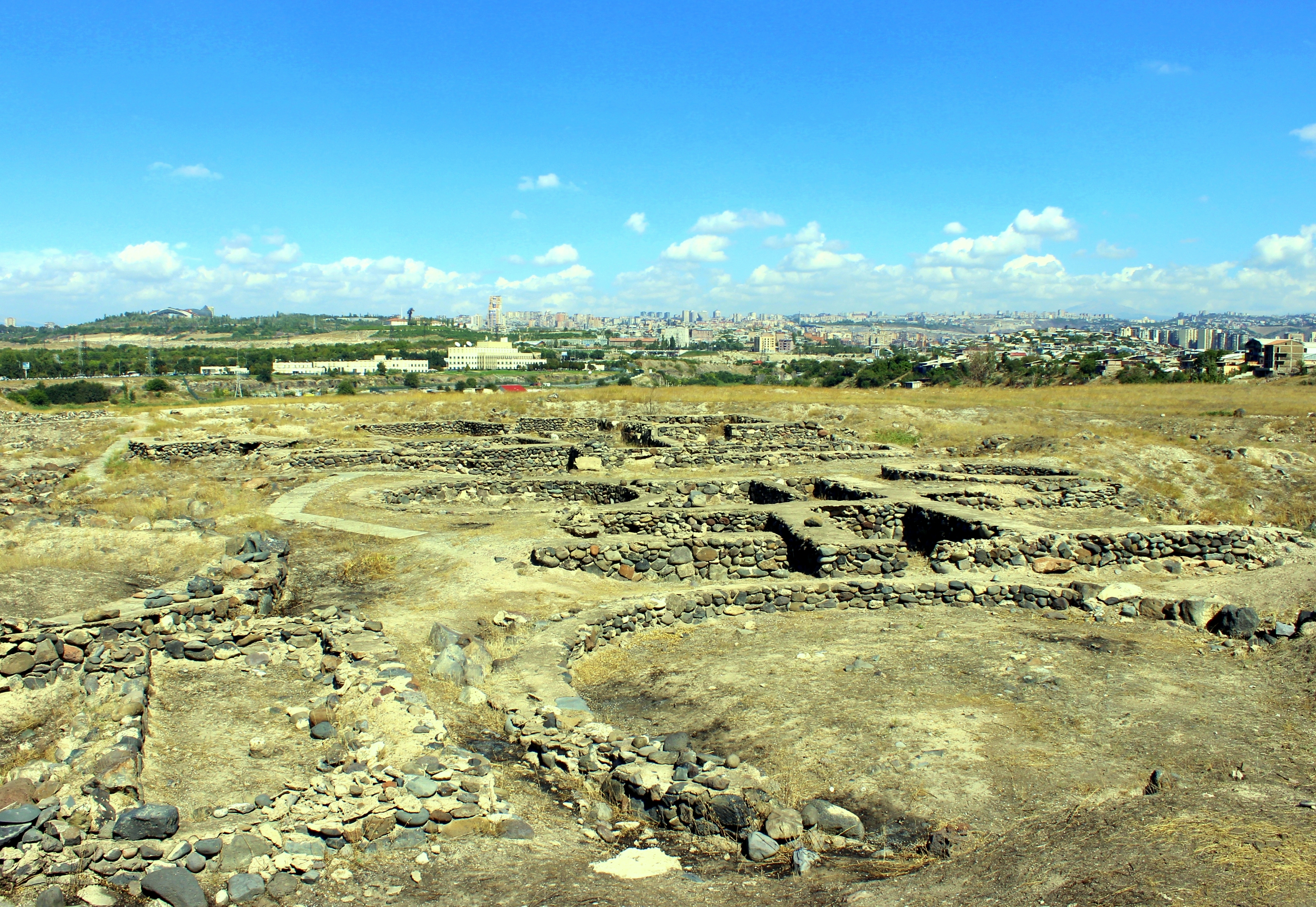
Stone foundations of Shengavit Settlement

The area of modern-day Shengavit district has been populated since the Stone Age.

The axis of Shengavit history is the Shengavit archaeological site - one of the most prominent centers of the Kura–Araxes culture. Backed by modern scientific dating, the ancient town of Shengavit in Yerevan is roughly 6,000 years old. For over a thousand years, this settlement was bustling with life as it transitioned through three major prehistoric eras (from the 4th millennium BC - 35th century BC to the 2nd millennium BC - 20th century BC). Excavations show it grew from a late Stone Age village into a flourishing Copper-Stone Age (Chalcolithic) community utilizing both stone tools and early metalwork. It was a walled urban settlement with round and square dwellings, narrow streets, and an underground passage leading to the Hrazdan River. At its peak between 3,000 BC and 2,500 BC, Shengavit fully entered the Early Bronze Age, transforming into a heavily fortified city and a massive regional center for advanced bronze metallurgy, weapon casting, and trade. This capital of the Kura-Araxes culture was eventually abandoned by the end of the Middle Bronze Age around 2,000 BC.

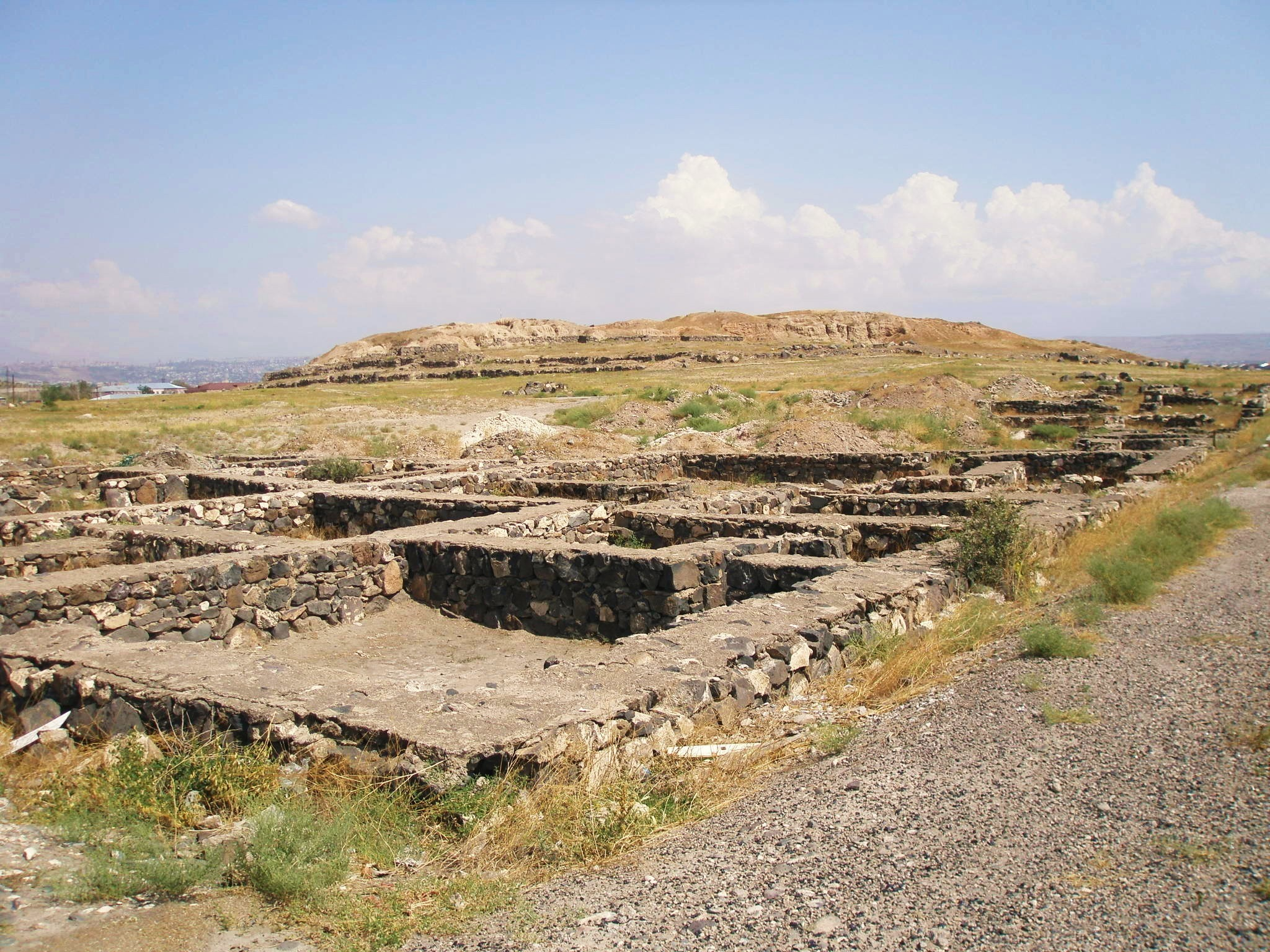
Foundations of Teishebaini within the Shengvait district

Another ancient settlement in the area - the archaeological site of Karmir Blur dates back to the first half of the 7th century BC and is home to the historical forthress-city of Teishebaini built by King Rusa II of Urartu.

==== Archeological excavations ====
Archaeologist Yevgeny Bayburdyan conducted excavations at the Shengavit historical site in 1936. Archaeologist Sandro Sardarian resumed the excavations between 1958 and 1983, but he left insufficient records to pinpoint exact locations where artifacts were found. In 2000, extensive excavation process was launched under the guidance of archaeologist Hakob Simonyan, who dug stratigraphic trenches at the edges of the old trenches excavated by Bayburdian and Sardarian. In 2009, professor Simonyan was joined by professor Mitchell S. Rothman from Widener University of Pennsylvania. Together they conducted three series of excavations in 2009, 2010, and 2012 respectively. During the process, a full stratigraphic column to bedrock was reached, showing there to be 8 or 9 distinct stratigraphic levels. These levels cover a time between 3200 BC and 2500 BC. Evidences of later use of the site (until 2200 BC) were also found. The excavation process revealed a series of large buildings, round buildings with square adjoining rooms and simple round buildings. Particularly notable are a series of ritual installations discovered in 2010 and 2012.

The present-day territory of Shengavit region was part of the Urartu/Van kingdom in the 9th–6th centuries BC (c. 860–590 BC). Later, it belonged to Greater Armenia, the Kotayk region of its Ayrarat province, first as part of the Orontid kingdom (6th–2nd centuries BC), then as part of the Artaxiad kingdom (189 BC – 1 AD) and the Arsacid kingdom (52–428 AD).

=== The Middle Ages ===
In the Middle Ages, the area was part of the Bagratid Kingdom (885–1045). After its fall, the region briefly came under Byzantine influence (1045–1064), while local Armenian princely houses (particularly the Zakarid dynasty) continued to rule until the 13th–14th centuries (Zakarid principality), before the area came under the rule of the Seljuks (c. 11th–13th centuries), Mongols (13th–14th centuries), and Turkmens (14th–15th centuries). The Mongols and Turkmen, especially the armies of Timur the Great, completely destroyed the Ararat Valley, Yerevan, and its surrounding settlements, burning down thousands of years-old structures and villages. Timur's raids dealt a severe blow to the economy and demography of Yerevan and all of central Armenia.

This area remained populated, and after the adoption of Christianity (starting in the 4th century), churches were founded here. The combination of historical and archaeological data allows us to confidently assert that in the Middle Ages there was a well-established settlement in the Shengavit area with its religious structures. It is especially famous for the St. Sargis Church in Shengavit. In the 1213 inscription in the vestibule of the Kecharis monastery, Shengavit is mentioned as a property acquired by the Vachutian princes. One of the most important historical centers of the region is Noragavit, an ancient village with more than 10 churches and its own writing school, connected to the Mother See. Here are preserved examples of medieval architecture, the most notable of which is the Church of Tsiranavor Saint Gevorg [Purple Saint George Church]: its foundations are attributed to the 4th-7th centuries (early Middle Ages), and it was later rebuilt in the 17th century following the devastating 1679 earthquake, which destroyed the infrastructure and religious sites in Noragavit and wider Aratat valley.

=== Early Modern Age ===
In the 16th century, the territory, as part of Eastern Armenia, came under the rule of Persia, in particular the Safavid Empire (1501–1736) and the Ghajar Empire (1789–1827). Some parts of the territory belonged to the Armenian church, for example, in the 17th century a vineyard and a mill belonged to the Aghjots monastery complex, and another vineyard belonged to the Bjni monastery. In the 17th–18th centuries, Shengavit was included in the diocese of the Holy Savior Monastery of Havuts Tar. In the 18th–19th centuries, the territory formed part of the Yerevan Khanate (1747–1828) and was a suburb of Yerevan, with rich gardens and fertile lands and its St. Sarkis Church. Historical records (like local parish records and manuscripts from Etchmiadzin Cathedral or Yerevan's older churches) distinguish between Verin (Upper) Shengavit and Nerkin (Lower) Shengavit, which in 17th to 18th centuries were villages engaged in agriculture in the vicinity of Yerevan Fortress. The settlements were also listed as separate entities for tax collection and irrigation rights from the Hrazdan River. The village of Noragavit, according to the French botanist Joseph Pitton de Tournefort (who spent the night here on August 8, 1701, during his travels), had 100 houses and was famous for its gardens and fine wine. In the 19th century, after Eastern Armenia was annexed to the Russian Empire, Shengavit continued to be an agricultural area. The Chamber Census of 1829-1832 documented the two villages as small agricultural settlements engaged in gardening and horticulture.

=== Modern history ===
In the 1920s in the area of Shengavit settlement the village of Nor Koghb specializing in agriculture emerged on the arable lands of the archaeological mound. The village was established and called Nor Koghb (New Koghb) by Armenians who fled the Ottoman Empire (Turkey) leaving behind the historical Armenian region and city of Koghb (today in Turkey and called Tuzluca).

Shengavit maintained agricultural activities until the 1920s when along with the expansion of Yerevan, it began to be gradually included in the city and was transformed into an urban industrial district. After the Sovietization of Armenia, the administrative area of Yerevan was gradually expanded to include the abandoned settlements of historic Shengavit absorbing Verin Shegavit and Nerkin Shengavit as well as Nor Koghb. In the 1960s the territory of Nor Koghb was submerged to construct Lake Yerevan. The remaining parts of Nor Koghb form the neighbourhood with the same name in today's Shengait district now in the Nerkin Charbakh area [they are often informally referred to as "Ghrer" (Armenian "Ղռեր" - derived from the root (ղռ-) "noise" - means “rough or rumbling place” and "dry lands", referring to the area’s arid terrain and industrial and railway noise. This colloquial toponym is used locally within the southern part of Shengavit].

The territory of today’s Shengavit was historically not a single village system but a mosaic of small settlements – all part of the same southern agricultural belt։ notably Verin Shengavit; Nerkin Shengavit; Noragavit (“Նորագավիթ” means a “new parish”); Nor Koghb (Նոր Կողբ), and Charbakh (Չարբախ) [the latter split later into Verin (Upper) Charbakh and Nerkin (Lower) Charbakh]. All these villages were gradually absorbed into Yerevan ultimately becoming parts of the Leninyan and Shahumyan districts in Soviet times.

Between the 1930s and 1980s, the districts of Yerevan changed several times through renaming and territorial reorganization. Most of the territory of the modern Shengavit district was located within the former Molotov District in the 1940s, which was later renamed Leninyan District (Լենինյան շրջան).

In 1930s major construction works were carried out to build a synthetic rubber factory in Yerevan. Alongside the industrial facilities, residential and auxiliary districts were also developed. The construction areas became known sequentially as:

- “Arajin mas / I mas” (“First district, First section”), where the synthetic rubber factory was built in 1933-1934. Calcium carbide production started in 1936, while chloroprene rubber (“Nairit”) production began in 1940.
- “yerkrord (II) mas” (“second section”), where the Yerevan "Chrompic" Plant was built.
- “yerrord (III) mas” (“third section)”, where the residential buildings were constructed, itself it had 8 neighbourhoods;
- “chorod (IV) mas” (“fourth section”), where auxiliary industrial facilities were located.

Later, in the 1950s, the Chrompik plant in Yerevan was phased out, and the name “second section” gradually fell out of use. Over time, the “fourth section,” which had functionally extended the “first part,” was assimilated into it. The abbreviated names “Arajin mas” and “Yerrord mas” eventually became widely used unofficial toponyms, largely because they were used as public transport stop names rather than official street or factory designations. The Yerrord mas residential district soon enlarged and in parallel to factory workers was inhabited also by the Armenian diaspora repatriates in 1940s-1950s becoming a large urban district.

In times of Soviet Armenia, the Leninyan District was the largest industrial hub of Yerevan. Enterprises of all-Union significance were located here, such as the Nairit Scientific and Production Association (rubber production), the Yerevan Thermal Power Plant, the Hayelectromekhena (ArmElectroMachine) Plant, the Kirov Chemical Plant, etc.

The modern Shengavit District was formed in 1996 during the post-Soviet administrative reforms. Its core territory derived from the former Leninyan District, including the historical Verin Shangavit and Nerkin Shengavit, along with the ancient Shengavit settlement and Karmir Blur area as well as the neighbourhoods informally called "arajin mas" and "yerrord mas" (Garegin Nzhdeh Square, Artashisyan Street, the Bagratunyats area, and the lower industrial belt). The district also incorporated Noragavit and Charbakh (Upper Charbakh and Lower Charbakh) neighborhood formerly part of the Shahumyan District (Շահումյանի շրջան), as well as parts of the former Spandaryan district (Սպանդարյանի շրջան) and Ordzhonikidze district (Օրջոնիկիձեի շրջան). Yerevan Lake is primarily associated with southern Shengavit, but parts of its surrounding territory border and interface with Malatia-Sebastia district.

Charbakh neighbourhood was originally formed as a small village in 1924 at the south of the historic Teishebaini site of Karmir Blur hill. An earlier microtoponym for part of the Charbakh was "Shasho's orchards" ("Շաշոյի բաղեր"). The village was established on the area at the southeast of Shengavit settlement, on the left bank of Hrazdan River where there used to be a walled garden with a summer palace (now destroyed), rows of trees, walkways and a pond with a fountain, to which a stream connected from four sides. The Charbakh village was mainly home to Armenian refugees from Nakhichevan and Van who called it after the ancient Charbakh village in historical Armenia Minor (Lesser Armenia), and then in Western Armenia, in the Shapin Garahisar province of the Sebastia vilayet, which was a purely Armenian-populated village until the 1915 Genocide. The name Charbakh is associated with Armenian "չարաբախտ" ("ill-fated"): one version attributes the name to poor craftsmen living in the area who lamented their bad fortune, while another connects it to Armenians repeatedly displaced by warfare and persecution. Another explanation is that the name derives from Persian words of chahar (چهار) meaning four, and bagh (باغ) meaning garden. As Eastern Armenia was annexed to Persia, Persian was the administrative language of taxation, land tenure, and governance in Eastern Armenia under Safavid and later Qajar rule and Persian-derived agricultural terminology became embedded in local Armenian rural toponyms because it described irrigation and orchard systems introduced or systematized under Persian administration. With the expansion of Charbakh, the village was divided into Verin Charbakh (Higher Charbakh) and Nerkin Charbakh (Lower Charbakh). In 1958, Charbakh became part of the newly-formed Shahumyan district, thus becoming absorbed by the city Yerevan.

Nor Kharberd (Նոր Խարբերդ) [means a "new" "rocky fortress" in Armenian] is the newest addition to Shengavit: it is a unique border settlement divided between Yerevan’s Shengavit district and the Ararat Province. Founded in 1929 by Armenian Genocide survivors from the Tlkatin village of the historical Kharberd province, it was named "New Kharberd" to commemorate their lost ancestral homeland. Today, it functions as a bustling suburban community with transportation links connecting the capital to southern Armenia.

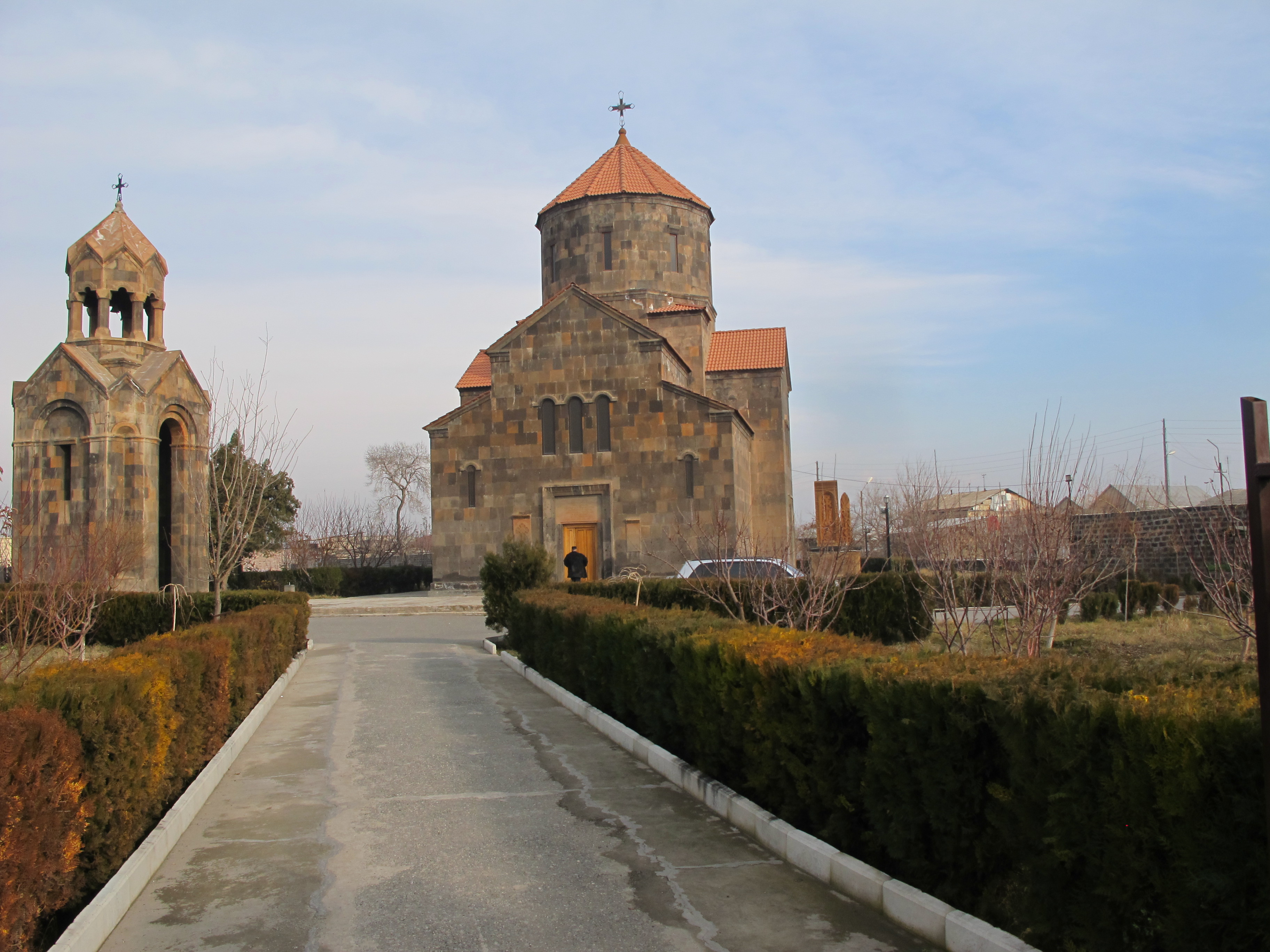
Holy Cross Church of Nerkin Charbakh, opened in 2006

== Demographics ==
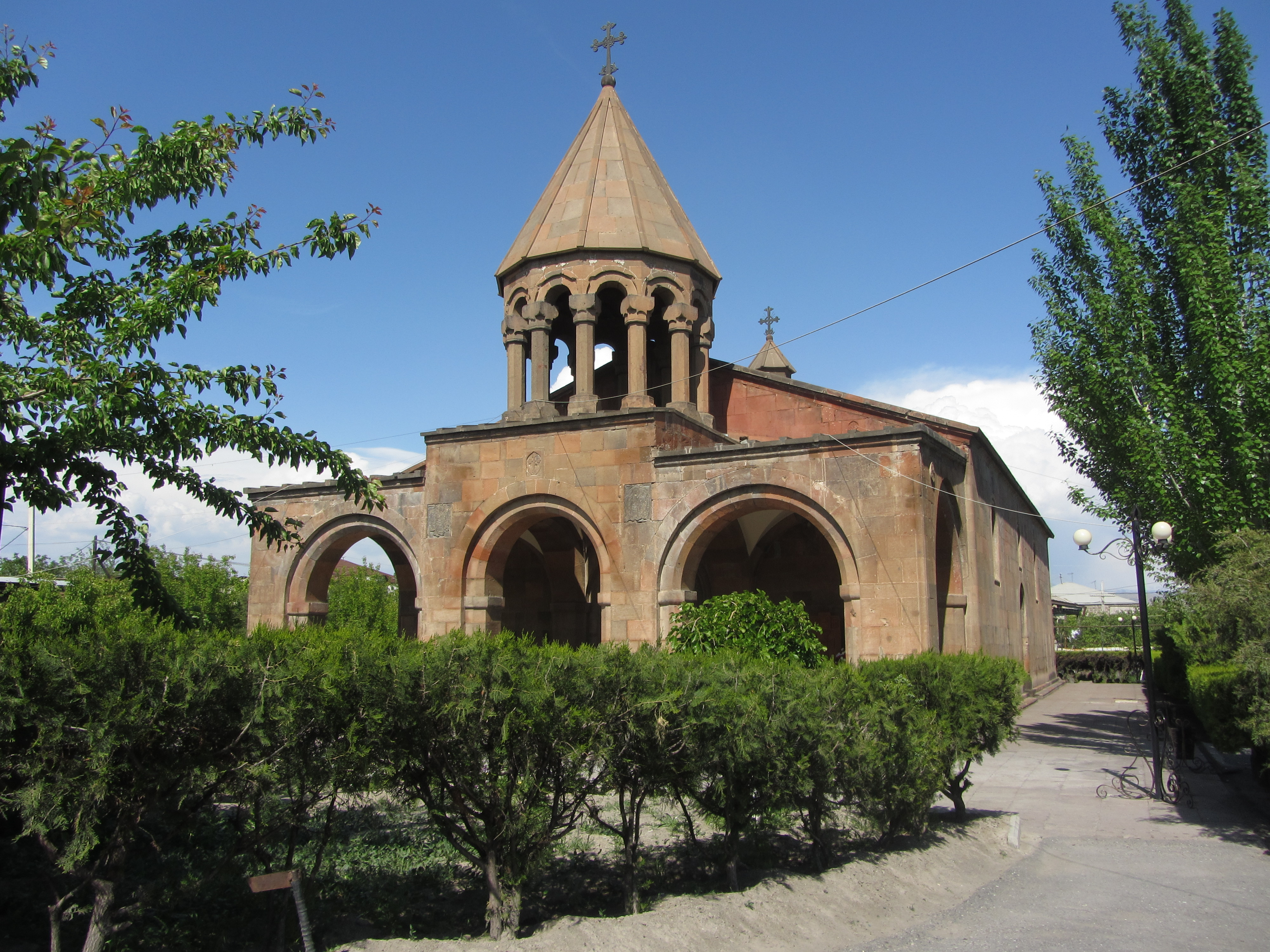
Surp Gevork Church of Noragavit

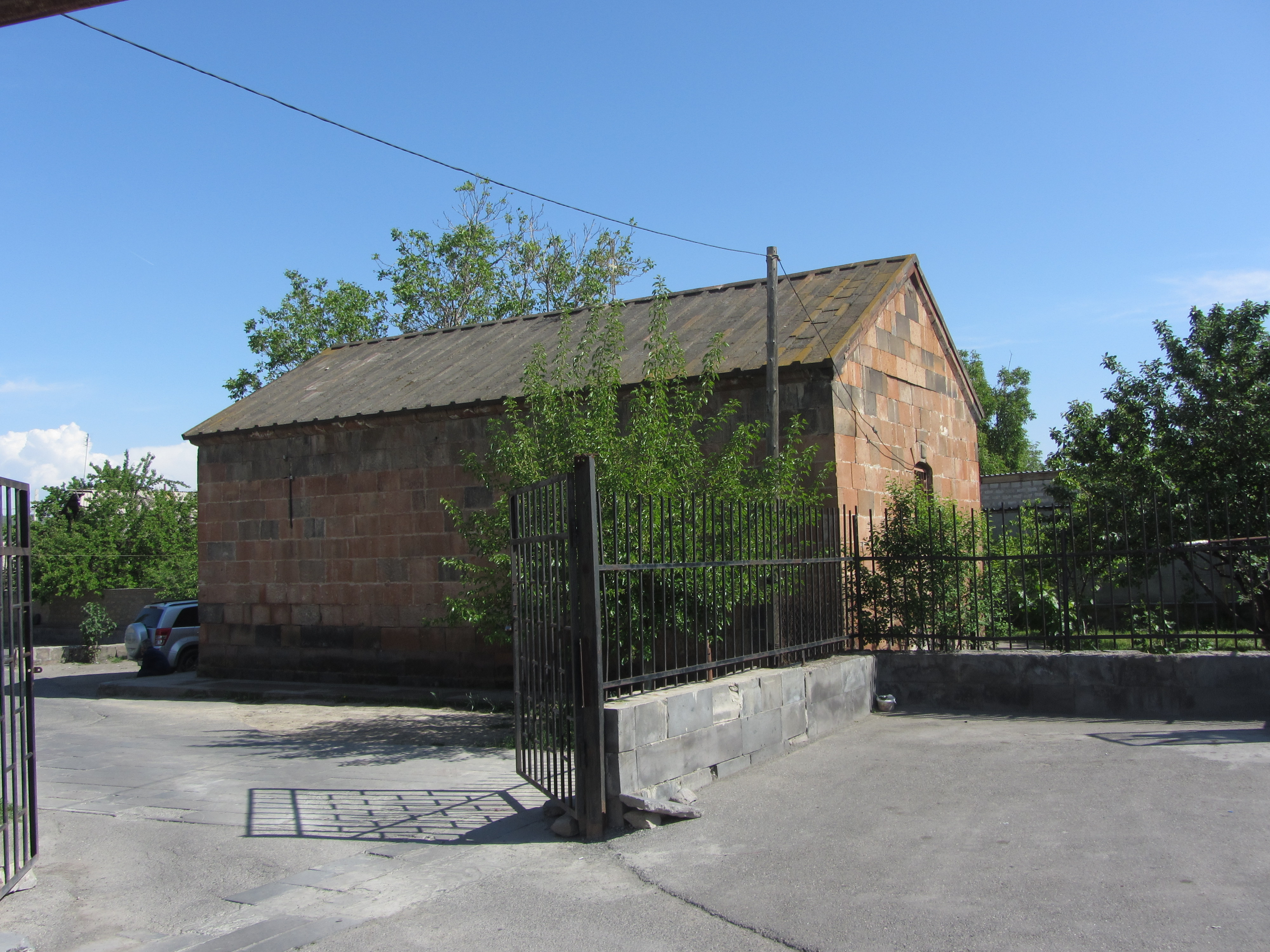
Surp Kiraki Church of Noragavit

As of the 2022 census, the district had a population of 140,525 (55% of which are female) [in 2016 it was 139,100], which is 12.93% of Yerevan city population and ranked 1st among the Yerevan districts. While its main population remains Armenian (98%), the region is also permanently inhabited by Yezidis (0.4%) and Russians (0.5%), in addition, there are residents temporarily in Armenia for work or study (Russians, Georgians, Persians, Indians, Ukrainians, Belarusians, Filipinos, Kazakhs, etc.).

=== Civil society ===
Shengavit is home to several major NGOs: Mission Armenia (humanitarian and social-support); Armenian Progressive Youth NGO (youth and civic engagement organization); Armenian Open Society Youth NGO (civil society/youth initiatives); Zinvori Mair (Soldier’s Mother) (veterans’ and military-family support).

==== Religion ====
Shengavit is mainly populated by Armenians who belong to the Armenian Apostolic Church.The district is home to the following churches:

- Tsiranavor Surb Gevork Church (Purple Saint George Church) of Noragavit, dating back to the 4th century, rebuilt in the 17th century.
- Surb Kiraki Church (Saint Sunday) of Noragavt, dating back to the 19th century.
- Surb Khach Zoravor (Holy Mighty Cross) Chapel, opened in 1991.
- Surb Khach Church (Holy Cross) of Nerkin Charbakh, opened in 2006.
- Surb Arakelots (Holy Apostles) Chapel in Verin Shengavit.

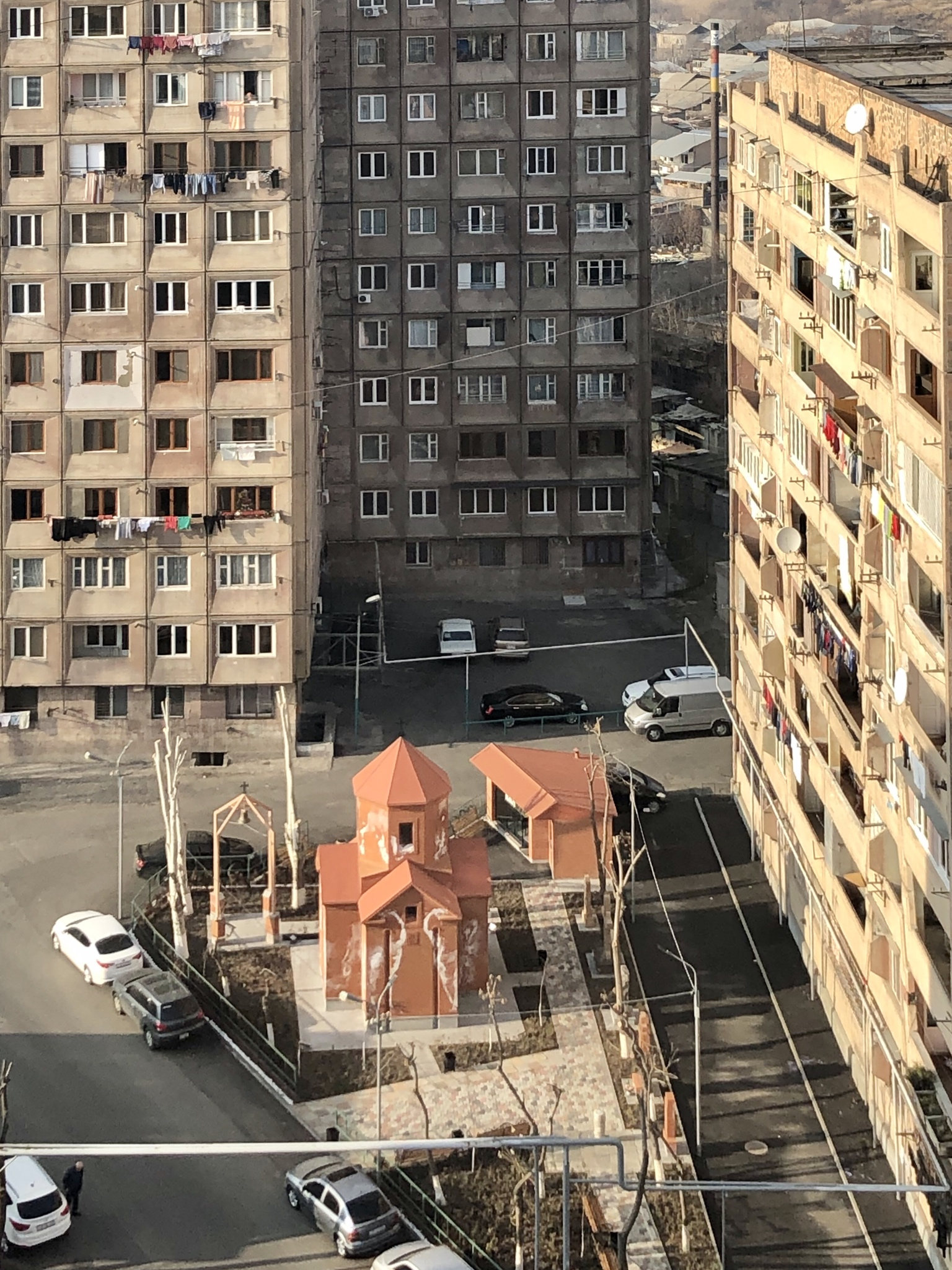
Holy Apostles Chapel in Verin Shengavit

The archeological remains of the Surb Grigor Lusavorich (Saint Gregory the Illuminator) Church (4th-7th centuries) destroyed in 1679 earthquake are in Noragavit․

=== Environment and Climate ===
The administrative region has a dry continental climate with low humidity, hot summers, and mild but sometimes cold winters. As Shengavit is located in Ararat Plain basin and close to the Hrazdan River floodplain, its terrain is lower-laying, flat and historically more suitable for gardens, orchards, vineyards, and irrigated agriculture. Unlike Yerevan's northern districts (Avan, Nork or Kanaker) that are located on elevated slopes and plateaus overlooking the Hrazdan gorge, Shengavit has a slightly warmer climate and is typically ~1 to 3°C warmer than the northern districts. Shengavit has a dense urban environment with significant traffic influence, and its low-lying basin location contributes to periodic air stagnation, especially during temperature inversions in the colder months. Shengavit and Yerevan's center suffer from high air pollution and dust. To counter this, resilient trees, like ash, elm, poplar, oak, and decorative shrubs are planted. However, green spaces remain insufficient for complete air purification. Consequently, long-term industrial waste has left permissible concentrations of heavy metals in certain Shengavit areas. The district is not ecologically homogeneous or widely polluted. It also has advantages, such as the proximity to the Hrazdan River gorge green corridor and older garden and orchard landscapes in pockets (especially Charbakh side). Lake Yerevan is a large ecosystem, but over the years it has accumulated domestic and industrial waste brought by the Hrazdan River, and despite periodic cleaning efforts, siltation and pollution remain a serious ecological challenge. The Hrazdan River Valley, which was one of the important axes of the ancient Urartian water systems, is today subject to ecological pressure, but continues to have an impact on local groundwater flows and microenvironments. Drinking water, including that of the street springs (known as pulpulak - ցայտաղբյուր, պուլպուլակ), is supplied from deep underground natural springs, mainly from the Garni spring.

== Culture ==
Libraries: Shengavit has many public libraries including the Library No.16 (1945), Library No.32 (1946), Library No.17 named after Shushanik Kurghinyan (1948), and Library No.18 for children (1980). The Shengavit No.5 House of culture is operating in Noragavit since 1948.

Theaters

- The Metro Theater of the National Center of Aesthetics (founded in 1992) stages musical and emotional performances for both adults and children. The theater also has a studio for theatrical education.
- The Mihr Contemporary Dance Theater (operating since 2003) works in the genres of modern dance, emotional dance, inclusive dance, site-specific performances, physical theater, and dramatic dance. The Mihr Creators' Union has founded and organized various events, including the Yerevan Book Fest and the Asank-Anank Festival, and also coordinates the dance platform and outdoor events of the HayFest International Theater Festival.
- Hayrenik Cinema (opened in 1951) is one of the oldest cinemas in Shengavit and is currently under restoration.
- The KinoPark cinema operates in Yerevan Mall.
- The formerly famous Sevan cinema is currently not operating as a cinema.
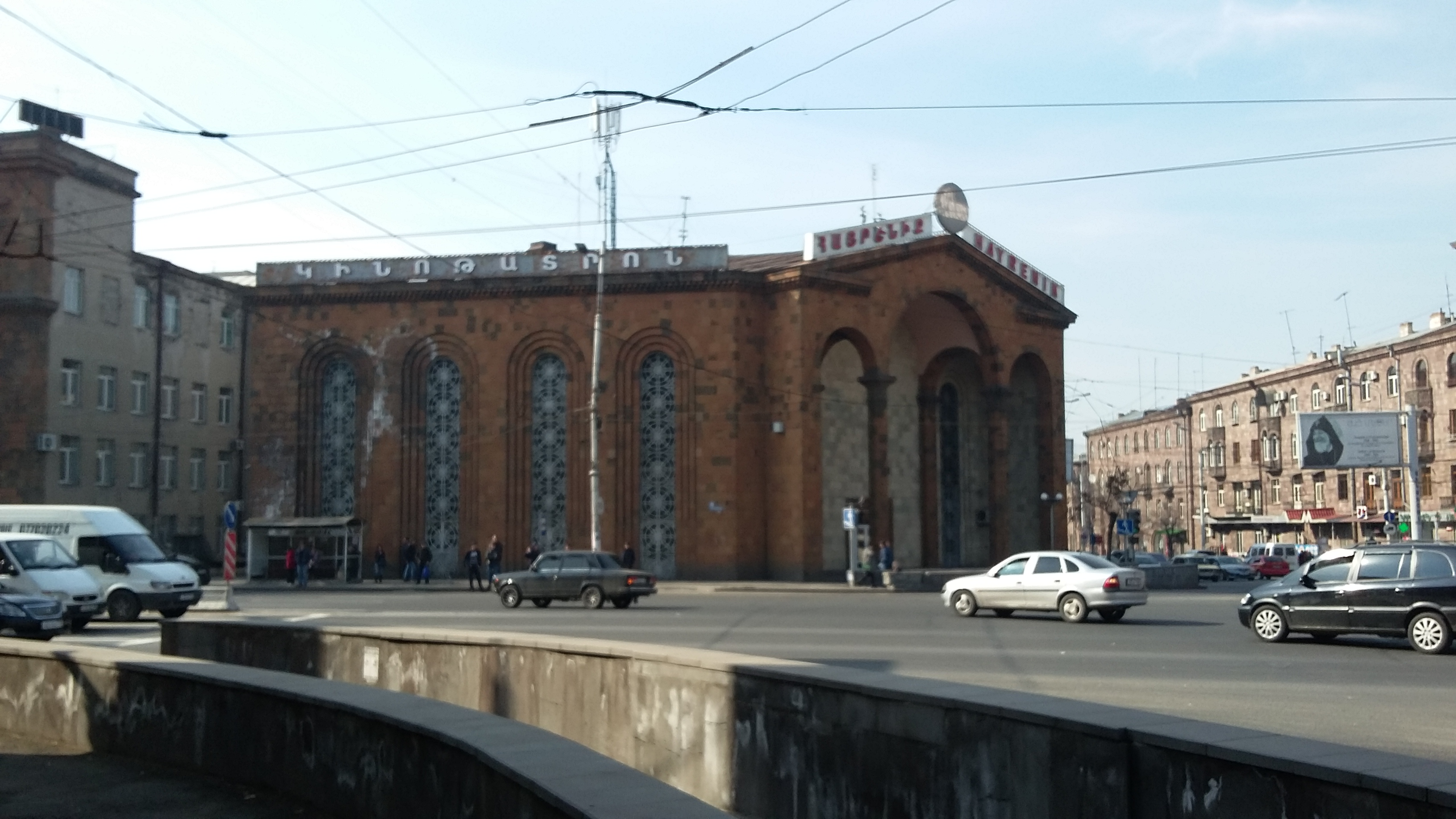
- Hayrenik cinema

=== Cultural heritage sites and Monuments ===
Many cultural heritage monuments are located in the district, including:

- Shengavit archaeological site dating back to 3200 BC,
- Teishebaini (Red Hill) ancient Urrartian settlement of the 8th century BC,
- Komitas Pantheon opened in 1936.

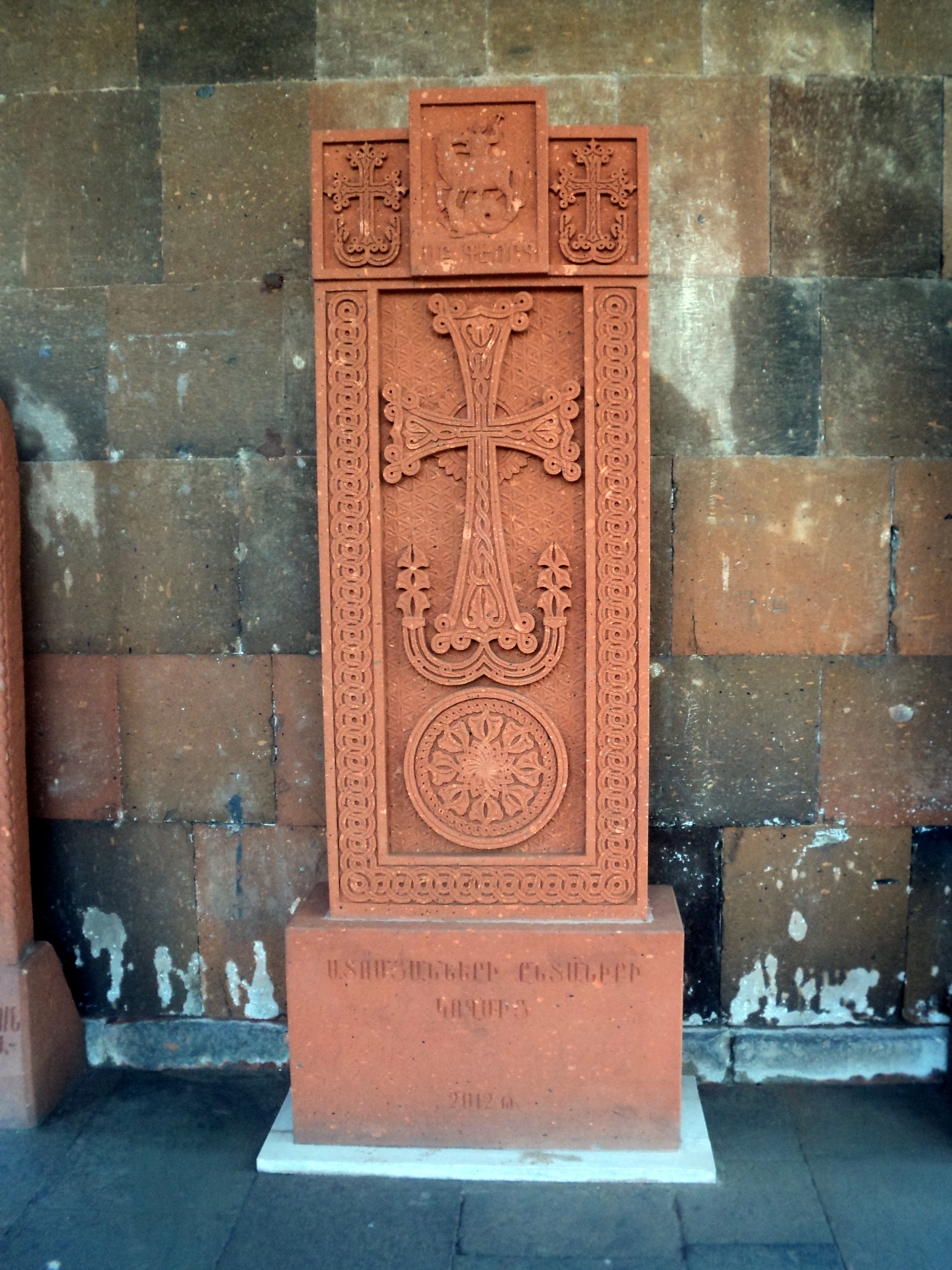
Khachkar in Noragavit

In Shengavit there are numerous ancient monuments: citadel; menhir (prehistoric communal era cult monument dedicated to the memory of ancestors); secret path; stone-dwelling place. The old Urartan city Teishebaini / Karmir Blur (Red Hill) is located on the left bank of the Hrazdan River in Shengavit district: built by King Rusa II in the 7th century BC, it was a major Urartian fortress and administrative center. There are also numerous khachkars (stone crosses) in Shengavit district.

Other monuments include:

- The Sculpture of Leatherworker by Sargis Baghdasaryan
- Derenik Demirchyan Monument (Armenian writer)
- Suren Spandaryan Monument (Armenian public and political figure)
- Bust of Hunan Avetisyan (hero of WWII)
- Monument to Artur Karapetyan (participant of the Artsakh War)
- Bust of Movses Gorgisyan (national hero of Armenia, pioneer of the Artsakh liberation war)
- Bust of Vissarion Belinsky (literary critic, publicist)
- Memorial to Artak Yenokyan (participant of the Artsakh War)
- Monument dedicated to the 100th anniversary of the Armenian Relief Society, ARS (the latter is in the Komitas Park)
- In the Komitas Pantheon, you can see more than 60 memorial statues, khachkars or tombstones, for example, the Komitas grave-monument, the statues of Leo, William Saroyan, Gegham Grigoryan, Avetik Isahakyan, the busts of Muratsan, Sargis Parajanov, Vahagn Davtyan, Hrachia Nersisyan, Mher Mkrtchyan, Sos Sargsyan, the monuments of Martiros Saryan, Aram Khachaturian, and many others.
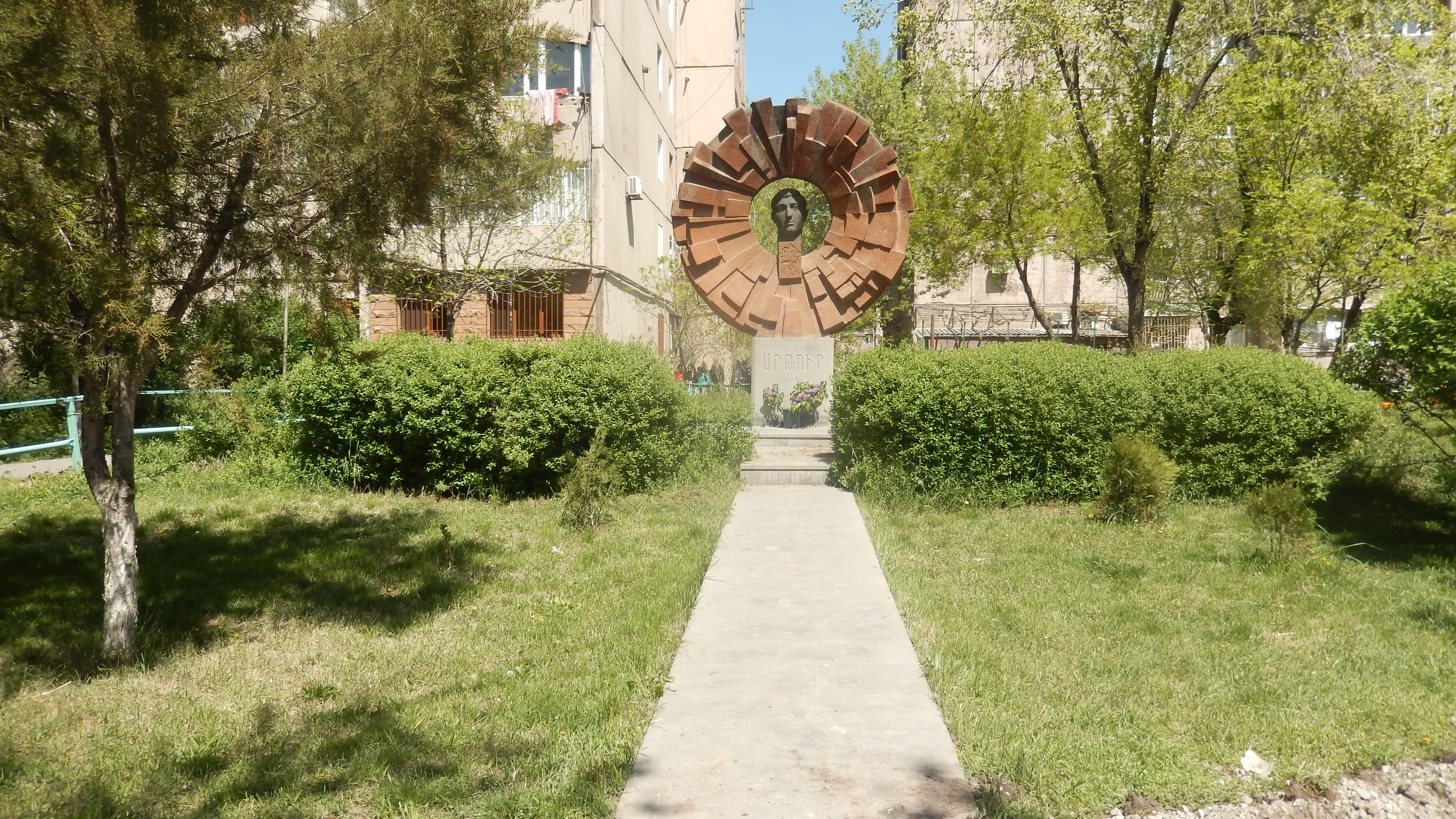
  Monument to Artur Karapetyan

=== Museums ===
- The Shengavit Historical and Archaeological Site-Museum was opened in 1968. It is the Shengavit branch of the Erebuni Historical and Archaeological Reserve-Museum and exhibits the finds discovered at the Shengavit archaeological site.
- Another branch of the Erebuni Historical and Archaeological Reserve-Museum is the Karmir Blur (Teishebaini) Historical and Archaeological Reserve-Museum located on the left bank of the Hrazdan River, where the remains of a powerful city-fortress of the Urartian era and valuable archaeological specimens discovered during excavations are exhibited.
- The Komitas Pantheon was founded in 1936 and the greats of Armenian culture are buried there.
- The Komitas Museum-Institute was opened in 2015 and is dedicated to the life and work of the composer and songwriter Komitas.
- The Armenian Medical Museum is a private museum operating since 1999, created on the basis of the personal collection of psychiatrist Harutyun Minasyan, and exhibits archaeological, geological, ethnographic, household, medical materials, and medical materials themselves, and also has a library, archive, and photo archive.
- The “Megerian Carpet” Museum-Factory (2014) presents unique specimens and exclusive collections of old (up to the 17th century) and new handmade carpets, and also presents the traditional handmade process of carpet production.
- The Sahak Sahakyan Art Museum is a private museum (since 2024), which presents the works of the Armenian sculptor Sahak Sahakyan.
- Ashot Navasardyan House-Museum (2025) is a memorial complex opened in the Yerevan house of the Armenian national political figure, which presents exclusive documents and personal belongings related to his dissident struggle, the Artsakh liberation war, and the history of building Armenia's independence.
- The Garegin Nzhdeh Museum (in the premises of Garegin Nzhdeh Primary School) presents the rich heritage, memories, and archival materials left by the military leader and philosopher Garegin Nzhdeh.
- The ArmExpo (Achievements of the National Economy) Exhibition Complex (founded in 1960) is an exhibition center where various industrial and economic exhibitions are held.

Shengavit Cultural Center No. 5 (operating in the Noragavit district since 1948) often organizes exhibitions of local antiquities, ethnographic samples, and folk art.

==== Parks ====
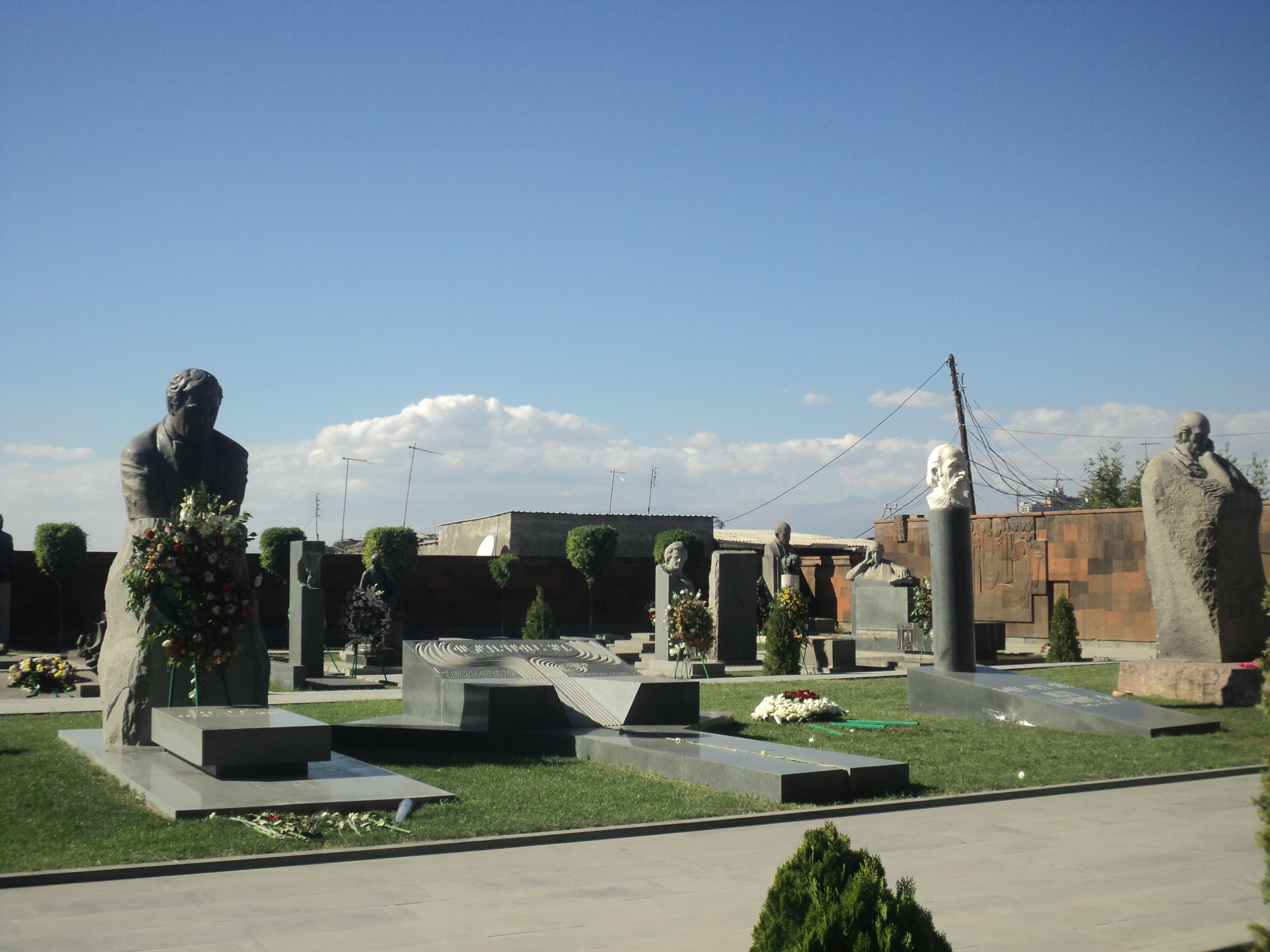
Komitas Pantheon

Although Shengavit is located on land traditionally rich in gardens, during Soviet era it evolved into an industrial district and has few parks. The most significant parks in Shengavit are the Komitas Pantheon-Park, Artur Karapetyan Park, Movses Gorgisyan Park, Aragats Park and Shoghakat Park.

- Komitas Pantheon and Park. The park was founded in 1930, and the pantheon was formed in 1936, when Komitas' remains were transferred from France and buried here. Famous Armenian artists, writers and composers are buried here, including Petros Durian, Vahan Terian, Avetik Isahakyan, Martiros Saryan, Aram Khachaturian, Vahram Papazian, William Saroyan and many others. The park has a peaceful and rich in vegetation.
- Shoghakat Park. It was founded in the 1980s. The park has fountains, pavilions, a playground, and a piano for playing with your feet. The Shoghakat TV company is located on the territory of the park.
- Arthur Karapetyan Park is a small green park for the daily recreation of the residents of the district. It was formed in 1993, when a bronze monument to freedom fighter Arthur Karapetyan was erected here.
- Movses Gorgisyan Park. In the 1990s, the park was named in honor of the national hero of Armenia, Movses Gorgisyan. The area features a marble bust of the hero, a recreation area, a swimming pool, and a children's playground.
- Noragavit Park. The Noragavit district, which is part of Shengavit, also has a local park with a playground for children.
- Aragats Park (founded in 2023) has modern landscape architecture, peaceful and clean atmosphere. When viewed from above, its green areas, paved alleys, and tree arrangement form the image of a huge palm tree. The central paved path of the park symbolizes the trunk of a palm tree, and the curvilinear paths branching off from it to the sides resemble the branches of the tree. Exotic tree species (such as Lankaran albitions and sakura) and green lawns are planted along these curves, which, when viewed from above, complete the appearance of a tropical leaf.
- A park has been built in 2022 near the Holy Cross Church in Nerkin Charbakh by boxer Arthur Abraham (a native of Charbakh).

The green hill of the Shengavit ancient site is not an official park, but is covered with natural greenery and offers beautiful views of Lake Yerevan and the Hrazdan Gorge. Entrance to the hill area is free, but the museum section is paid.

The section of the Hrazdan River Gorge stretching downstream from Lake Yerevan is rich in natural greenery, although it is not yet fully developed as a city park.

== Education ==
Almost 15% of the public schools of Yerevan are located in Shengavit. As of 2016–17, the district has 29 public education schools, 2 private schools, as well as 1 vocational school.

The Shengavit administrative district hosts a diverse array of higher education and specialized vocational colleges focused on arts, culture, medicine, and industrial sciences:

- Yerevan State College of Fine Arts after Panos Terlemezian, an elite institution for painting, design, and sculpting (opened in 1921).
- Yerevan Culture University which specializes in arts management and production
- Yerevan Charles Aznavour State College of Culture and Arts provides secondary vocational education in various fields of art and culture and includes the former Yerevan State College of Pop and Jazz Arts, thus also organizing educational programs in jazz and pop music.
- Grigoris Medical-Humanities College & Institute provides dedicated training in nursing and medical sciences.
- Qunatum College focuses on mathematics, sciences, and advanced English, and offers the prestigious International Baccalaureate (IB) Diploma Programme and serves as an authorized testing hub for Oxford and Cambridge university entrance exams.

There are also institutions providing various non-formal education.

"Ayas" Aeorspace Society provides aerospace education - a special 2-year space science certificate course developed by astronomer Avetik Grigoryan (at the Quantum College), which can be followed by a research internship at the "Bazoomq" Space Research Laboratory.

The Center for Human Rights and Genocide Studies implements special educational programs titled "Know Your Rights" and "Voices of Genocide Memory."

=== Musical Schools ===
Musical schools: Armen Tigranyan Music School (1949) and Stepan Jrbashyan Music School No.8 (1965) are also located in Shengavit. There are various dance schools: "Gisane" Dance School-Studio, Shengavit branch of Sofi Devoyan Dance School, Shengavit branch of Sardaryan Dance Studio, Dvin Dance Studio, "Idance Academy", "Syuzanna Grigoryan's" Dance Art Studio, "Viva" Dance Studio, "Hasmik" Dance Ensemble.

== Sport ==
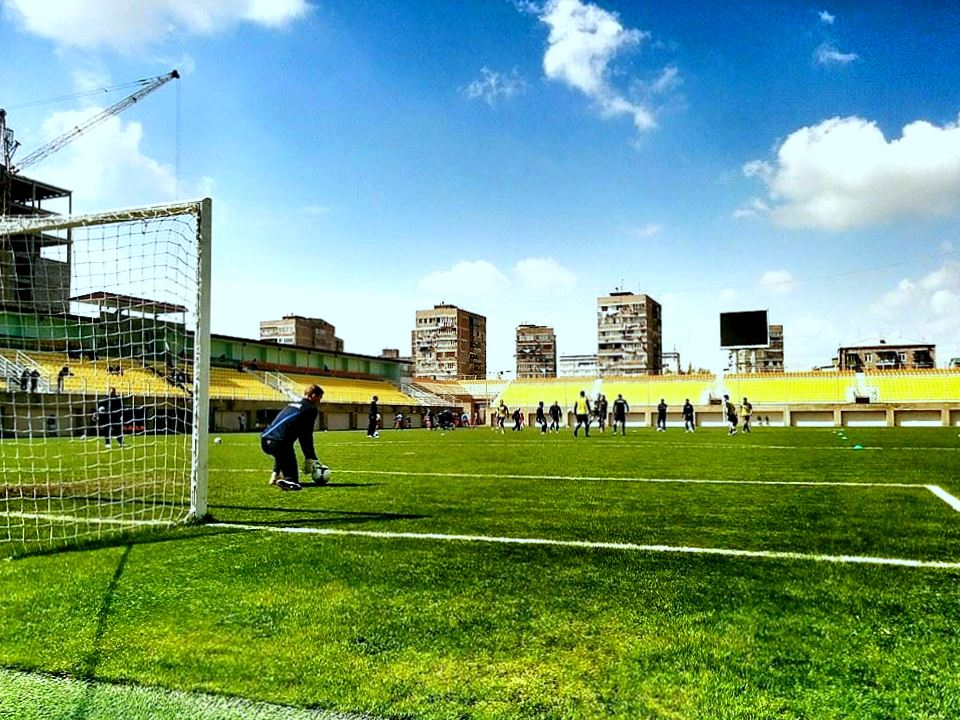
Mika Stadium

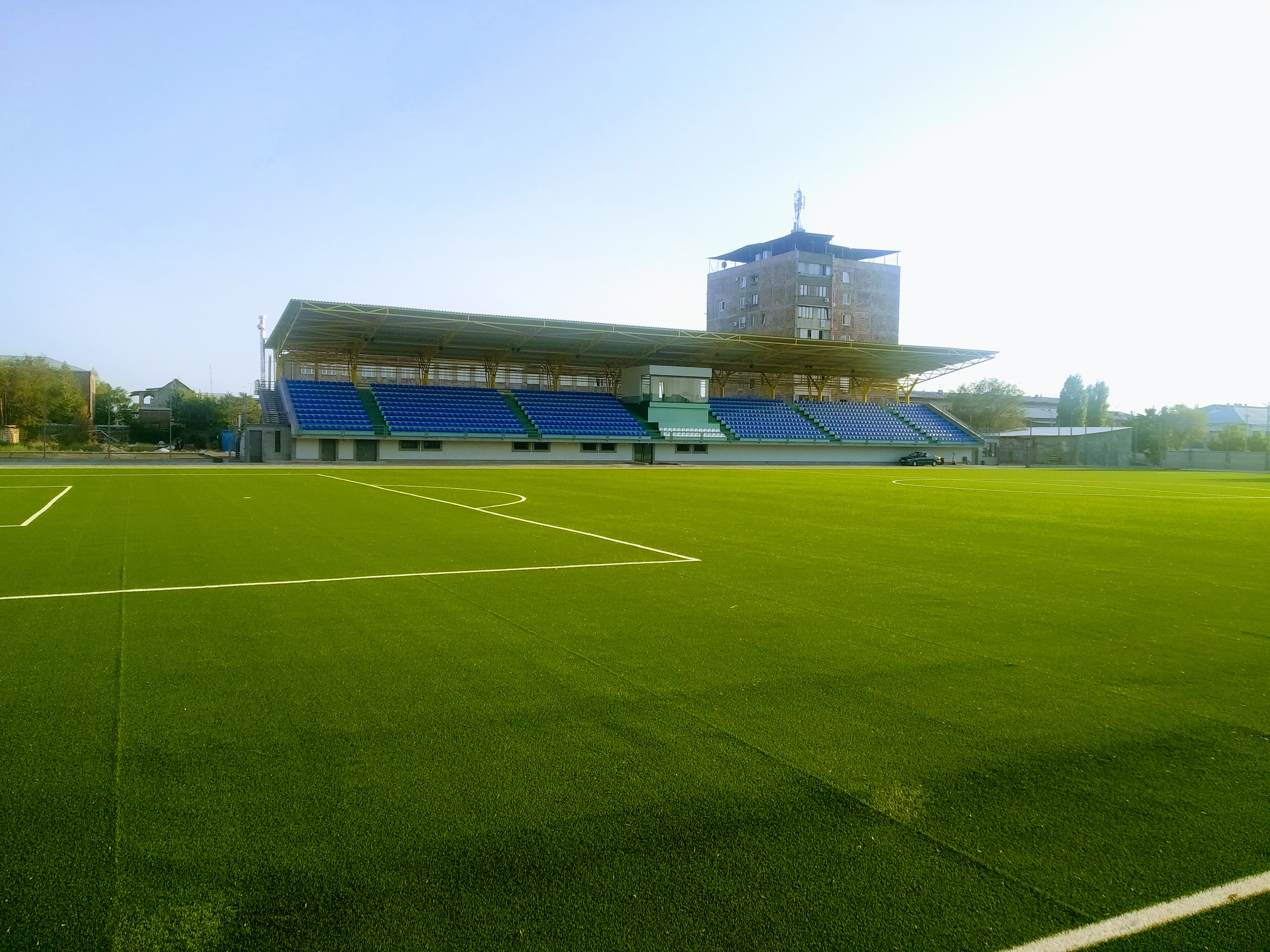
Junior Sport Stadium

Shengavit is home to many prominent sport venues of Yerevan, including:

- Alashkert Stadium, opened as Nairi Stadium in 1960, home to Alashkert FC since 2011.
- Mika Stadium, opened in 2008, was home to currently-inactive FC Mika.
- Mika Sports Arena, opened in 2009, is the home ground of the Armenia national basketball team.
- Hovik Hayrapetyan Equestrian Centre, opened in 2001.
- Junior Sport Stadium, formerly known as Shengavit Football School, was operated by the currently-inactive Ulisses FC until 2014.

The district is also home to several sport schools, including:

- Children and youth complex sport school of Shengavit, opened in 1946, specialized in basketball, handball, chess, field hockey, sanda-wushu, volleyball and boxing.
- Children and youth table tennis and tennis sport school of Shengavit, opened in 1948.
- Children and youth sport school of acrobatics and rhythmic gymnastics of Shengavit, opened in 1970.
- Yerevan Chess Academy, opened in 1996.
- Grand Sports Centre, opened in 2011, home to indoor sports arena, swimming pool and many outdoor sports facilities.
- Rafael Vaganian children and youth chess school of Shengavit, opened in 2015.
- Children and youth Republican sport school of shooting.
- Children and youth cycling specialized school of Olympic reserve.

The district is also represented at the Armenian Futsal Premier League through the Charbakh Yerevan Futsal Club formed in 2015.

== Transportation ==
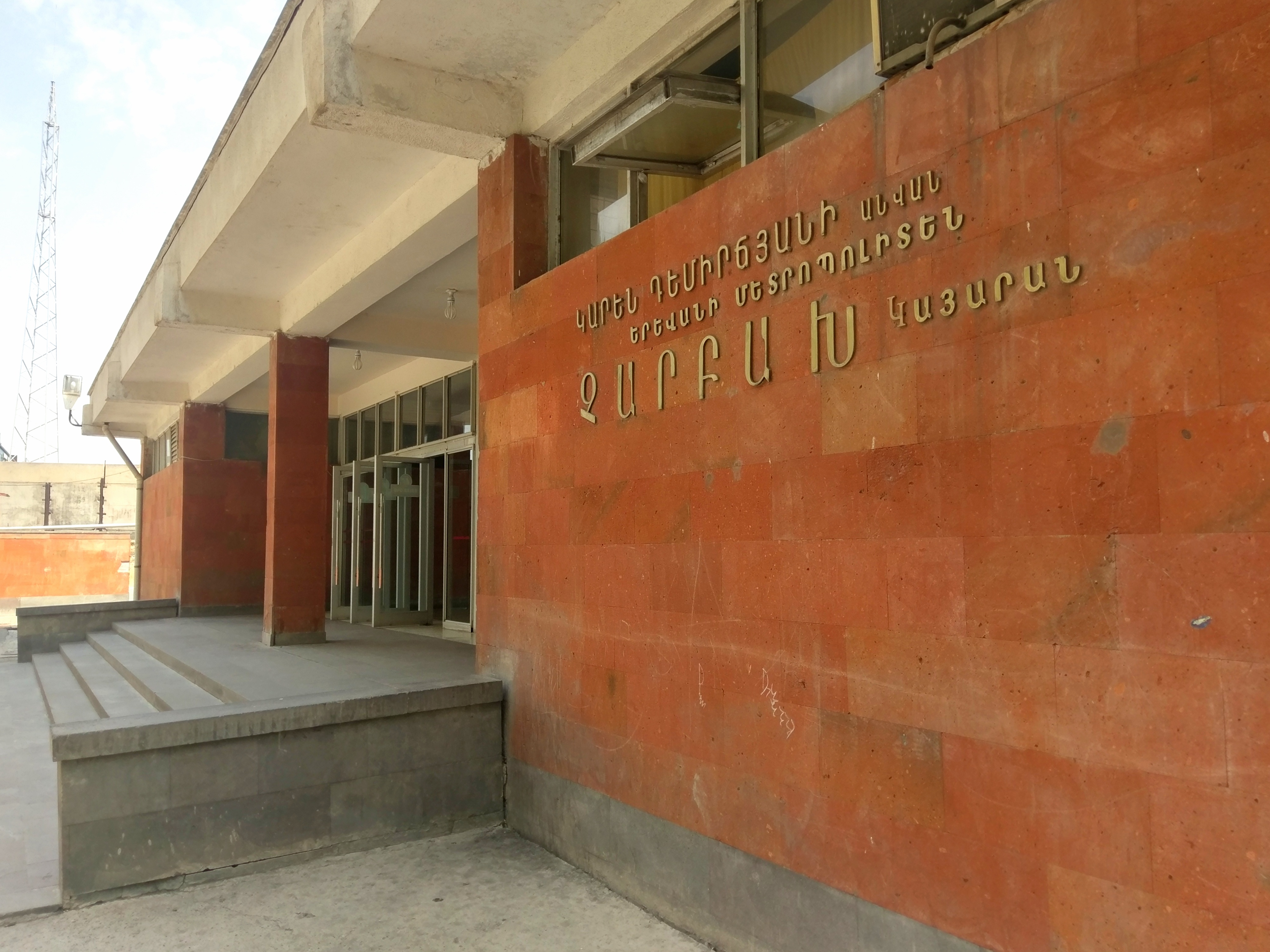
Charbakh metro station

Garegin Nzhdeh Square along with the metro station of the same name form the district's center. The main streets of the district are Garegin Nzhdeh Street, Shirak Street, Artashesyan Street, Bagratunyats Avenue and Arshakunyats Avenue.

Public transport in Shengavit administrative district includesmetro (underground), bus and trolleybus routes, which provide connections to the center of Yerevan and other districts.

The Yerevan underground metro has 4 stations within the district:

- Gortsaranain (Factories) station opened on 11 July 1983,
- Shengavit station opened on 26 December 1985,
- Garegin Nzhdeh Square station opened on 4 January 1987 (as Spandaryan Square station),
- Charbakh station, opened on 26 December 1996.
- In addition the Sasunci Davit (central railway) station is on the border of Shengavit and Erebuni district.

The Shengavit Electrodepot opened between 1981 and 1985 is the main depot of the Yerevan Metro, currently able to house more than 70 railroad cars.

Yerevan (Sasuntsi Davit) railway station is located on the border of Shengavit and Erebuni districts. Noragavit railway station serves suburban electric trains departing from Yerevan to the Ararat Valley and vice versa.

Shengavit is home to Yerevan's "Sasuntsi Davit" (southern) bus station, from where regular bus routes operate to the southern regions of Armenia (Ararat, Vayots Dzor, Syunik) and Gyumri.

The Erebuni military airport is located in the area.

== Economy ==
=== Industry during the Soviet period ===
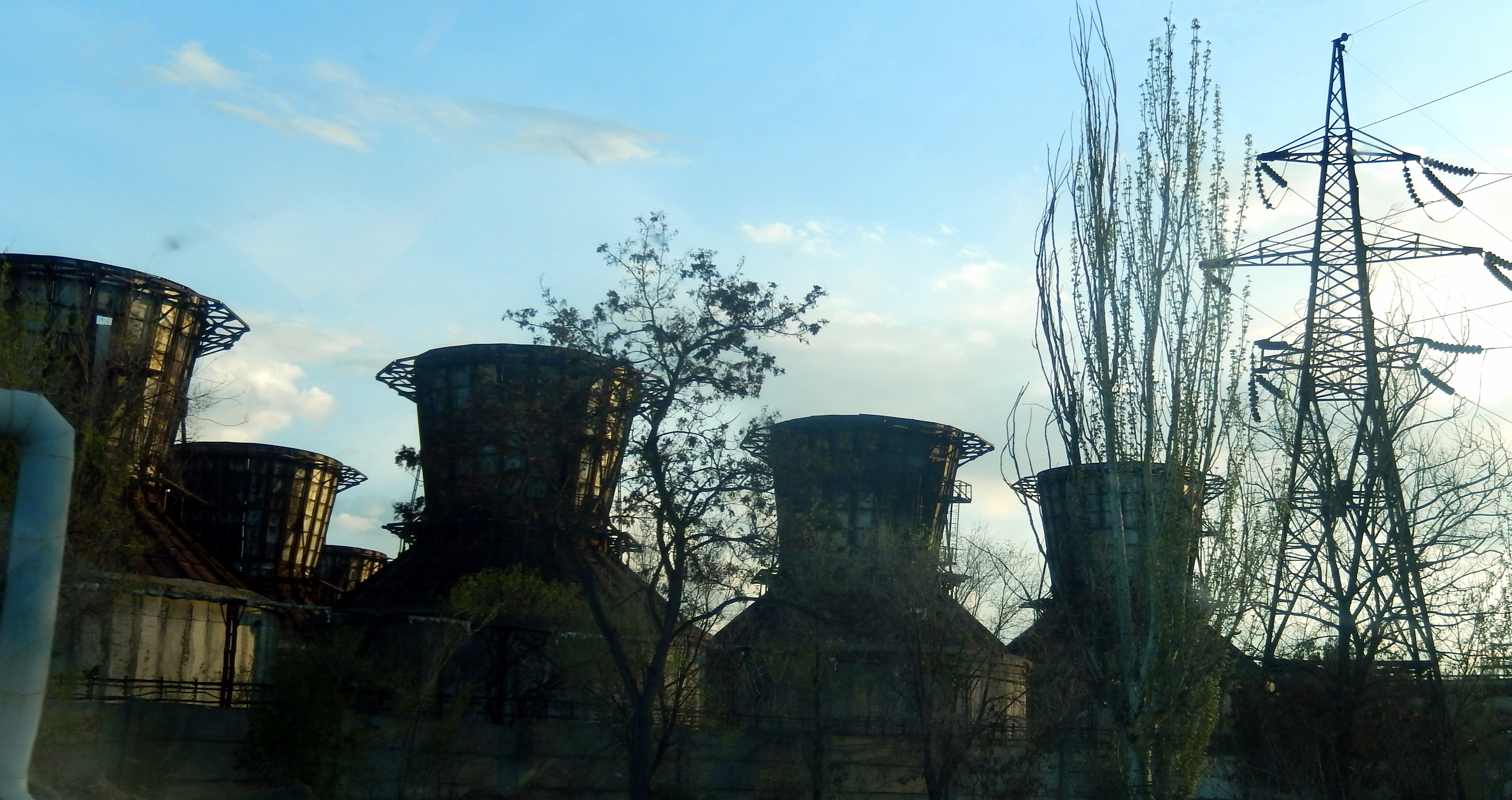
Nairit chemicals plant

Shengavit became a highly industrialized district in the 20th century with large factories and manufacturing plants. Thus the Armen-Carpet plant was opened in the district in 1924, followed by the Yerevan Plant of Rubber Technical Products in 1927. In 1930, the new building of Yerevan Machine-Tools plant (operating since 1905) was opened in Shengavit.

During the 1940s, the production of chemicals and electrical tools was boosted by the Soviet government. In 1940, the Nairit Chemicals Plant and ArmElectroMash plant for electrical equipments were opened. In 1943, the Yerevan Tire plant, Yerevan Polyvinyl acetate factory, Yerevan Compressors plant, and Yerevan Textile factory were opened, followed by the Yerevan Cable Factory in 1945.

The Yerevan Wool plant was opened in 1951, followed by the Chemreagent plant for chemical reactors in 1953, while the Electroapparat Yerevan electrical equipments plant was opened in 1956. In 1960 and 1961, the Yerevan Electron plant for electrical machines and the new building of the Yerevan Leather Factory (operating since 1894) were opened respectively in Shengavit. In 1962, the Masis shoe factory of Yerevan was formed in the district as a result of the consolidation of several factories in the city. In 1963 and 1967, the Yerevan plant for chemical reactors and Yerevan chemical-pharmaceutical firm were opened respectively.

The Yerevan poultry farm of Charbakh was opened in 1957.

However, after the independence of Armenia, most of the heavy industry plants were abandoned or only survived with their minor capacities.

=== Post-independence industry ===
During the revival period after the economic crisis, many new large plants were inaugurated in Shengavit, including: Arantsk plant for roof fittings since 1995, Grand Tobacco for tobacco products since 1997, Shen Production for paints and building materials since 1999, Grand Candy factory for food products since 2000, Megerian handmade carpets mill since 2000, Shogh vegetable oil producing industrial complex since 2001, Mikmetal for metal structures since 2003, Narsan plant for roof fittings since 2003, Yerevan Metal Group Factory for steel products since 2007, Alex Grig alcohol plant in 2007 (replacing the former Polyvinyl acetate factory), Megerian Shin for metal structures since 2009, and Sil-Maaza plant for water and beverages since 2012, and Alex Textile hosiery plant since 2015.

Minor industrial firms of the district include: Eurostan Uyut for building materials since 1987, Hayk-Mek Wood Plant since 1991, Moks Plast for plastic products since 1995, MMM Plant for building materials since 1997, Veks Group for building materials since 1997, Daroink Food Plant since 1998, Karastan plant for building materials since 2000, Latino coffee processing plant since 2005, Anush plant for food products since 2005, Ekoprof plant for building materials since 2006, Orient Stone plant for building materials since 2009, AR Garment Factory, and Crystal plant for household chemicals.

Shengavit has a layered industrial placement: light industry and services are located in the district’s north (near to Yerevan city center, the Bagratunyats Avenue – Garegin Nzhdeh zone); heavy and light manufacturing core is in the middle (Arshakunyats avenue part and Hrazdan valley edge); logistics, agro-industry and warehousing is located in the South (Noragavit (the modern logistics engine of Shengavit); and Charbakh); and export and bulk industrial functions are grouped in the far southern edge (the Artashat highway corridor – the highway-export logistics belt). Most heavy Soviet-era factories are now partially closed, downsized, or repurposed. Post-1990s development shifted Shengavit more toward food production, light manufacturing, logistics, and mixed residential-industrial zones.

The major factories and industrial plants in Shengavit are:

- Grand Candy (confectionery production) located in Nerkin Shengavit
- Artfood Cannery (canned food production) located in Verin Shengavit / Arshakunyats border zone
- Grand Tobacco (tobacco products manufacturing) located in Nerkin Shengavit
- Alex Textile (hosiery and textile production) located in Nerkin Shengavit
- Mikmetal (metal structures production) located in Nerkin Shengavit
- Megerian Handmade Carpets (carpet production) located in Nerkin Shengavit (industrial-commercial edge)
- Shogh Oil Plant (vegetable oil processing) located in Nerkin Charbakh
- Sil-Maaza (bottled water and beverages) located in Nerkin Charbakh
- Charbakh Poultry Farm located in Nerkin Charbakh
- SPAYKA Group facilities (transport, logistics, agro-industrial base) located in Noragavit
- Aeratsia Wastewater Treatment Station (sewage treatment plant) is in the Aeratsia micro-district.

IT / Software / Tech is also developing in the District:

- Viasphere Technopark CJSC software and technology hub (in Nerkin Shengavit)
- U-com (with head office in Nerkin Shengavit)
- Synopsys Armenia has a presence in Nerkin Shengavit
- Solicy software company (in Verin Shangavit)
- Megapolis Lab software and digital development company (in Verin Shangavit)
- X-TECH Armenian software company has offices in Verin Shangavit

=== Services ===
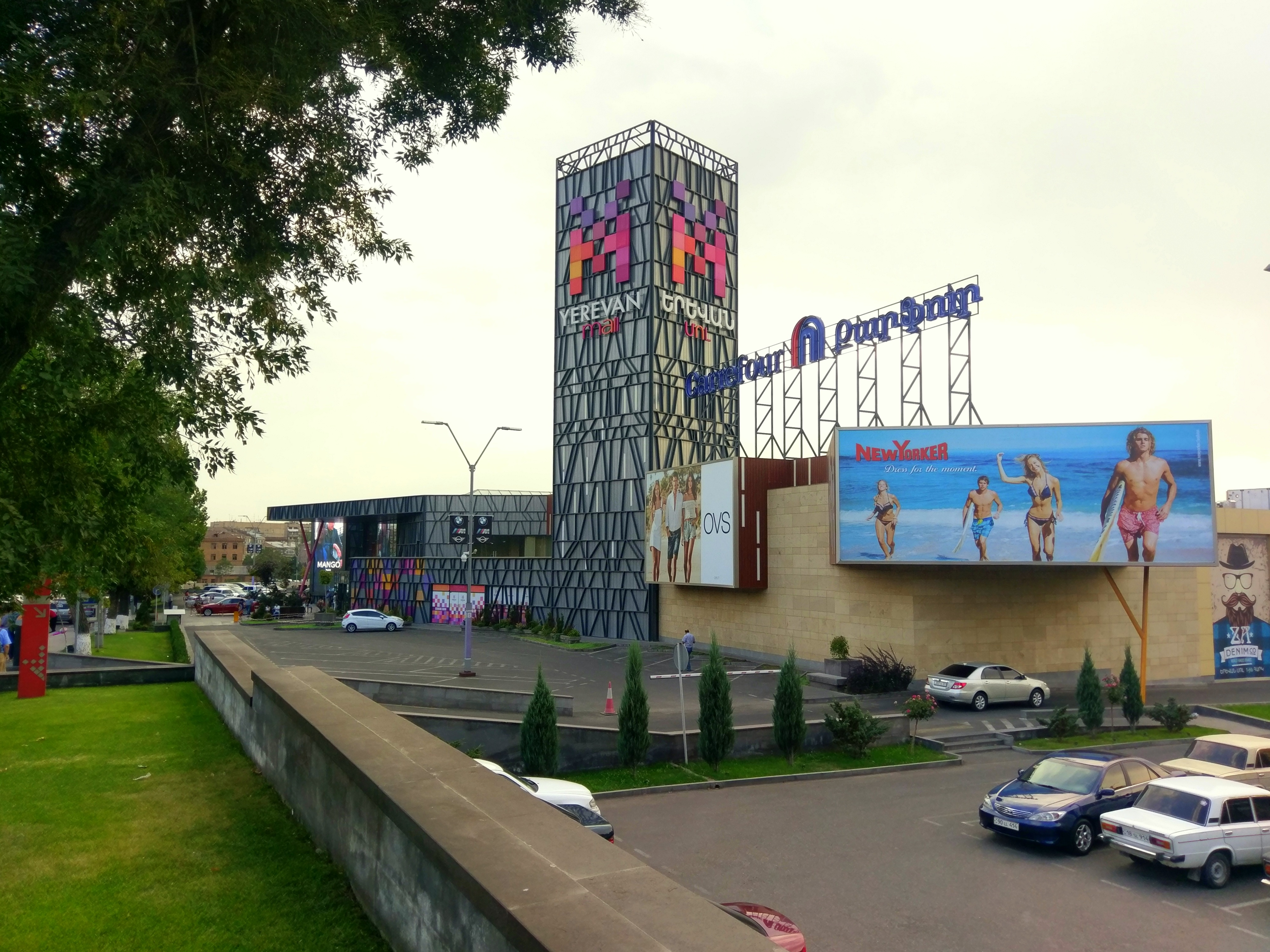
Yerevan Mall

Arshakunyats Avenue of Shengavit is home to many trade shops, galleries and commercial offices, including the "Synopsys Armenia" headquarters and "Hayrenik" cinema-theatre. It is also home to Yerevan Mall, one of the largest shopping centres in Armenia. Many other large shopping centres are also operating in Shengavit, including "Petak" Trade Center, "Yerevan" Market, and "AR-BE" Armenian-Belarusian Trading House.

Health

- The Shengavit Medical Center (founded in 1938) is a multidisciplinary medical diagnostic institution with services in obstetrics, gynecology and reproductive health, as well as general surgery, otolaryngology (ENT), cardiovascular, eye laser correction, aesthetic surgery and other narrow professional areas. It includes "Shengavit" Maternity Hospital.
- "Surb Astvatsamair" (Holy Virgin) Medical Center (since 1982) specializes in pediatric and adult surgery, resuscitation (including 3rd level pediatric resuscitation), thoracic, cardiac and plastic surgery, polytrauma and neurosurgery. Includes the hospital complex and the adjacent "Artashisyan" polyclinic.
- "Karmir Blur" Health Center (since 1965) is a multi-profile primary health care institution that provides comprehensive outpatient services for both adults and children.
- "Arshakunyats" Health Center (since 1970) provides outpatient medical care and services to the population.
- "Bagratunyats" Health Center (since 1970) is a comprehensive health center that has separate adult and pediatric departments.

== Gallery ==
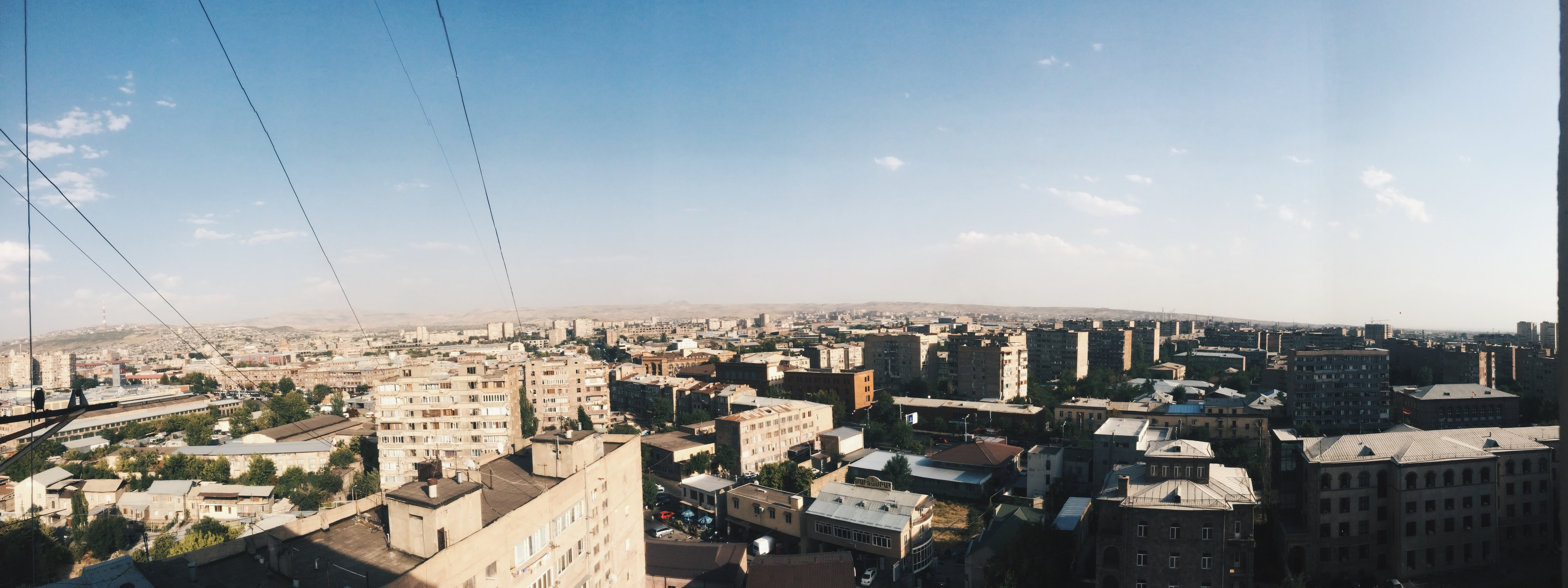
Shengavit District from Verin Shengavit
