= Nerkin Charbakh =

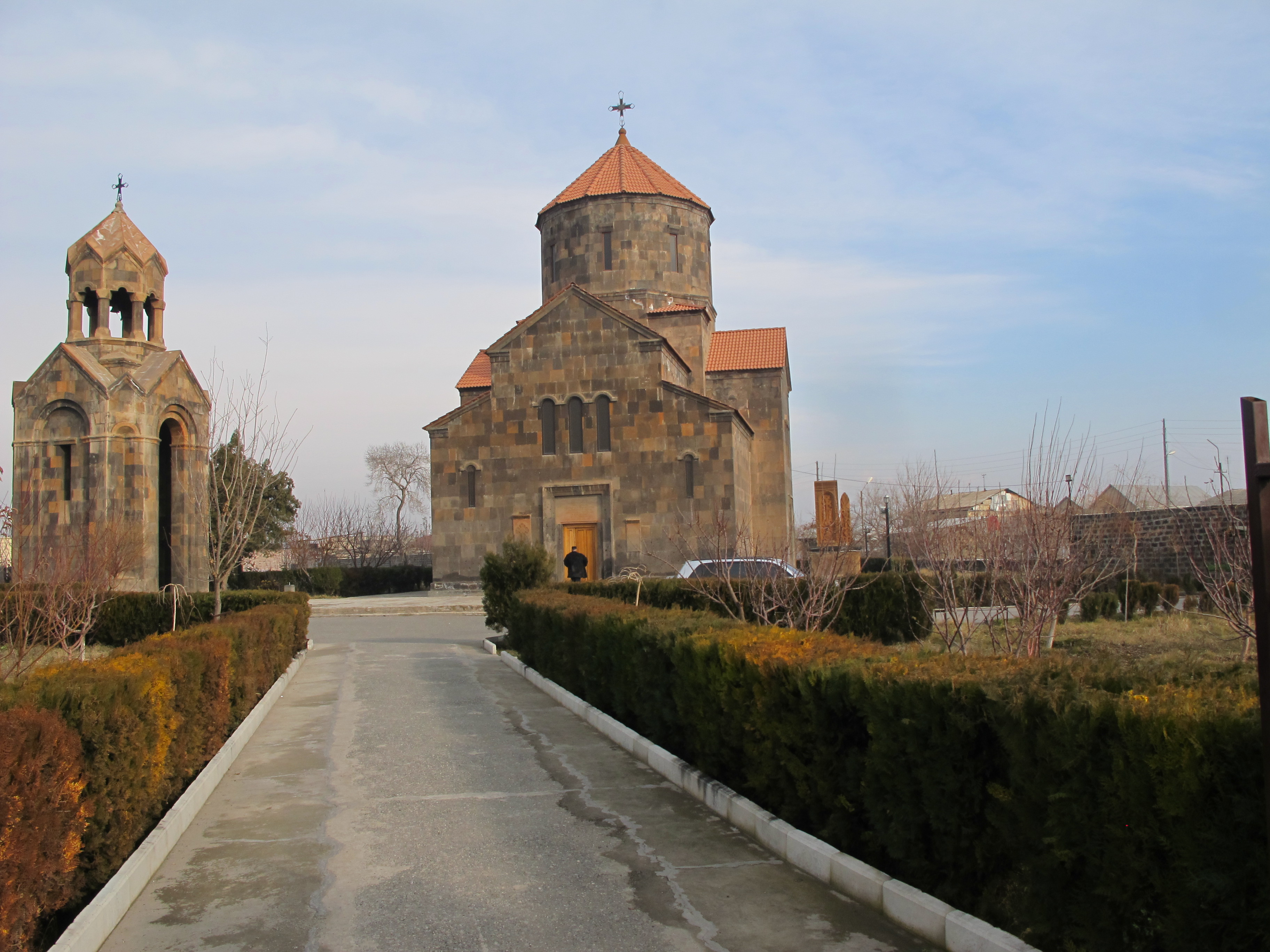
- Surb Khach Church

- Location within Armenia
- Coordinates: 40°07′45″N 44°26′50″E
- Country: Armenia
- Marz (Province): Yerevan
- District: Shengavit
- Founded: 1924
- Time zone: UTC+4 ( )
  - Summer (DST): UTC+5 ( )

Nerkin Charbakh (Armenian: Ներքին Չարբախ), (also, Nerkin Ch’arbakh and Nizhniy Charbakh) is a part of Shengavit District in Yerevan, Armenia.
