= Dzhrashen =

Dzhrashen may refer to:

- Jrashen (disambiguation), multiple places in Armenia
- Verin Dzhrashen, Armenia
