= Jrashen =

Jrashen or Jrashen may refer to:

- Jrashen, Lori, Armenia
- Jrashen, Ararat, Armenia
- Jrashen, Armavir, Armenia
- Verin Jrashen, Armenia
