= Lyon Park =

Lyon Park may refer to:

- Lyon Park, Yerevan, Armenia
- Lyon Park (Wisconsin), a public park in Wisconsin Rapids, Wisconsin
- Lyon Park Historic District, Arlington, Virginia
