= Mushavan =

- Location within Armenia
- Coordinates: 40°08′45″N 44°33′58″E
- Country: Armenia
- Marz (Province): Yerevan
- District: Erebuni
- Time zone: UTC+4 ( )

Mushavan (Armenian: Մուշավան, formerly known as Tsornatap, Shorbulakh and Mushakan), is a neighbourhood in the Erebuni District of the Armenian capital Yerevan.
