= Vardashen =

Vardashen may refer to:

- Vardashen, Ararat, Armenia
- Vardashen, Yerevan, Armenia
- Oğuz, Azerbaijan (formerly known as Vartashen or Vardashen)
