= List of correctional facilities in Armenia =

Map of Armenia with the locations of correctional facilities

As of December 2012, there were 12 correctional facilities in Armenia. Armenian prisons are overcrowded. In total of 12 facilities designed for 4,391 people, there were 4,697 prisoners in February 2012, up by more than 400 compared to June 2009, when 4,294 prisoners were held in these facilities.

Name	Armenian	Location	# of prisoners designed for	Notes
Nubarashen	«Նուբարաշեն»	Nubarashen, Yerevan	840	
Kosh	«Կոշ»	Kosh, Aragatsotn	640	
Sevan	«Սևան»	Hrazdan, Kotayk	548	
Prison Hospital	«Դատապարտյալների հիվանդանոց»	Kentron, Yerevan	464	
Erebuni	«Էրեբունի»	Nubarashen, Yerevan	391	
Artik	«Արթիկ»	Harich, Shirak	373	
Abovyan	«Աբովյան»	Abovyan, Kotayk	250	For women and minors
Vanadzor	«Վանաձոր»	Vanadzor, Lori	245	
Goris	«Գորիս»	Goris, Syunik	215	
Hrazdan	«Հրազդան»	Hrazdan, Kotayk	215	
Vardashen	«Վարդաշեն»	Nubarashen, Yerevan	380	For foreigners and military officers
Yerevan-Center	«Երևան-Կենտրոն»	Kentron, Yerevan	60	
TOTAL			4,391	

== New prison in Armavir ==
A new prison is currently under construction in the city Armavir, not far from capital Yerevan. It was scheduled to be completed in fall 2013. The opening of the prison in Armavir will allow the authorities to lose the Nubarashen prison. $20 million will be spent on its construction.
