= Nor Aresh =

- Location within Armenia
- Coordinates: 40°08′51″N 44°31′32″E
- Country: Armenia
- Marz (Province): Yerevan
- District: Erebuni
- Time zone: UTC+4 ( )

Nor Aresh (Armenian: Նոր Արեշ), is a neighbourhood in the Erebuni District of the Armenian capital Yerevan.
