= Nor Butania =

Nor Butaniya
- Location within Armenia
- Coordinates: 40°09′23″N 44°31′02″E
- Country: Armenia
- Marz (Province): Yerevan
- District: Erebuni
- Time zone: UTC+4 ( )

Nor Butania (Armenian: Նոր Բութանիա), is a neighbourhood in the Erebuni District of Yerevan, Armenia.
