= Argishti =

Argishti may refer to:

- Argishtis I of Urartu - 785 - 763 BCE
- Argishti II of Urartu - 714 - 685 BCE
- Argishti, Yerevan, a village
