= Saritagh =

- Location within Armenia
- Coordinates: 40°09′38″N 44°31′40″E
- Country: Armenia
- Marz (Province): Yerevan
- District: Erebuni
- Time zone: UTC+4 ( )

Saritagh (Armenian: Սարիթաղ), is a neighbourhood in the Erebuni District of Yerevan, Armenia.
