= Nubarashen District =

District in Yerevan, Armenia

Nubarashen Նուբարաշեն
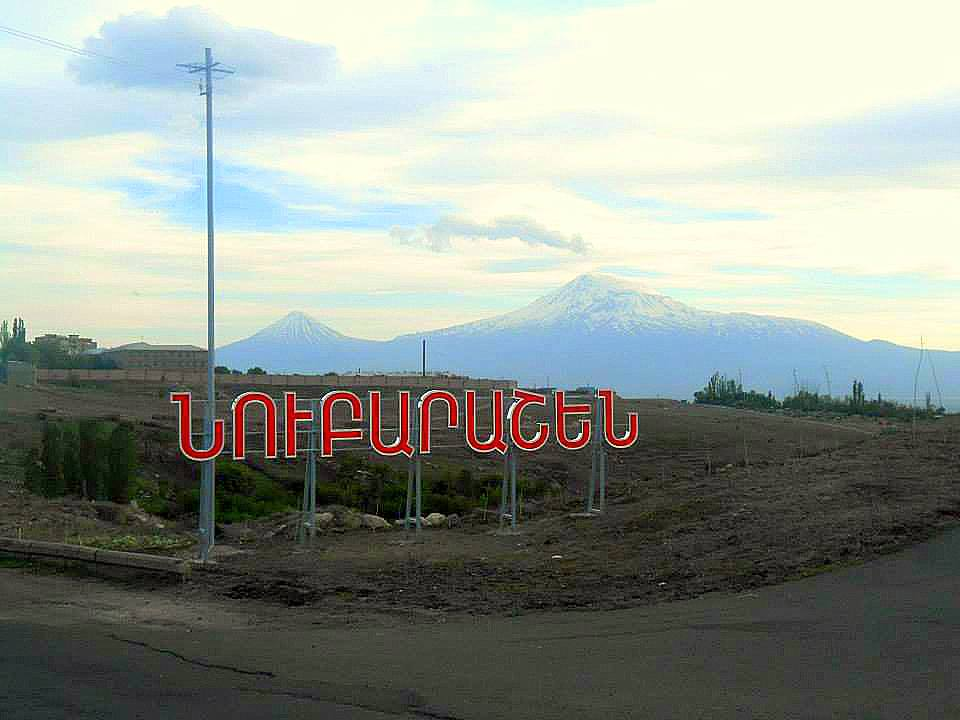
- The entrance to Nubarashen

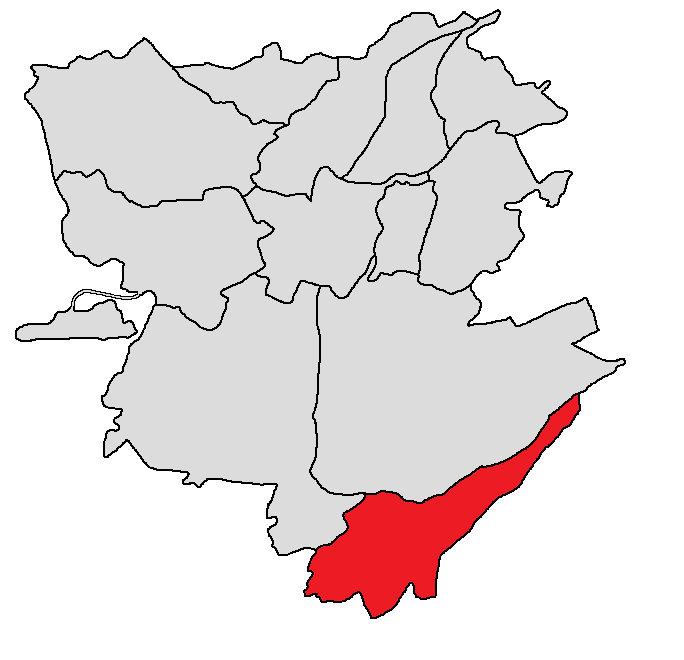
- Coordinates: 40°05′31″N 44°32′57″E
- Country: Armenia
- Marz (Province): Yerevan
- Founded: 1932

Government
  - Mayor of District: Telman Tadevosyan

Area
  - Total: 17.24 km^{2} (6.66 sq mi)

Population (2022 census)
  - Total: 11,794
  - Density: 684.1/km^{2} (1,772/sq mi)
- Time zone: UTC+4 (AMT)

Nubarashen (Armenian: Նուբարաշեն վարչական շրջան, romanized: Nubarashen varch’akan shrjan), is one of the 12 districts of Yerevan, the capital of Armenia. It is situated at the southeastern part of the city. It is bordered by Shengavit and Erebuni districts from the north, and Ararat Province from the east, south and west.

== Overview ==
With an area of 18 km² (8.07% of Yerevan city area), Nubarashen is the 5th-largest district of Yerevan in terms of area. It is located around 7 km southeast of central Yerevan, completely isolated from the city.

The Nubarashen Central Park and the nearby Ghevond Alishan №85 School (opened in 1932) are situated at the centre of the district. The Nubarashen Military Base occupies a large portion of the eastern half of the district.

As of 2016, the population of the district is around 9,800.

== History ==
After the Sovietization of Armenia, the Armenian General Benevolent Union (AGBU) became the only diaspora organization that was permitted to operate within the Armenian Soviet Socialist Republic. The permission was granted to the AGBU in 1923.

In 1926, during the Philadelphia meeting of the United States branches of the Armenian General Benevolent Union (AGBU), a decision was taken to fund the construction of a new residential settlement in the Socialist Soviet Republic of Armenia, in honor of the founder of AGBU; the Armenian benefactor Boghos Nubar. The main goal of the project was directed towards the repatriation of the Armenian families who survived the Armenian genocide and dispersed all over the Middle East and Europe.

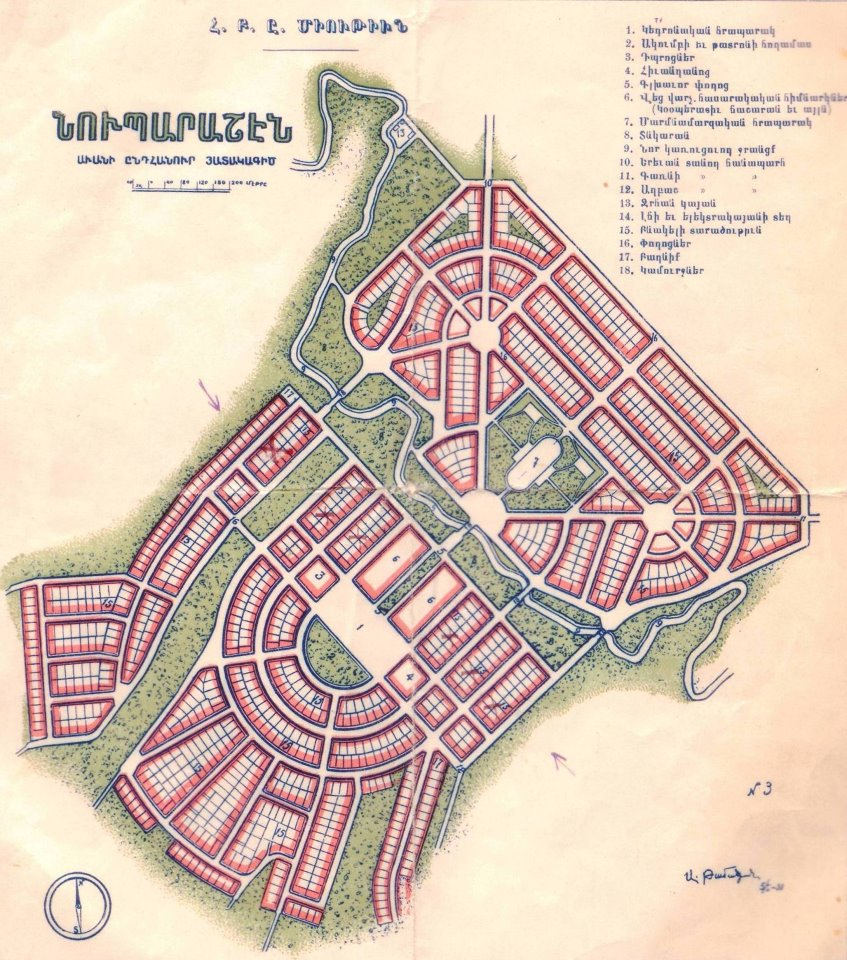
The original plan of Nubarashen, designed by Alexander Tamanian

For the fulfillment of the project, an amount of US$250,000 was envisaged to raise until April 30, 1931, in order to launch the project in the 25th anniversary of the AGBU organization. US$102,000 was donated from Armenians in New York City, and US$25,000 was received from Chicago. However, many of the Armenian wealthy donors became victims of the Great Depression of 1929. Thus, only US$153,000 was secured by the end of 1929.

The Communist government of Armenia has proposed many locations for the initiative, including Yeghvard, Sardarapat and Metsamor. Finally, the location of the settlement was chosen to be at the southeastern outskirts of the capital Yerevan, to the south of Noragavit neighbourhood.

Boghos Nubar donated US$100,000 for the project, and finally an agreement was settled between the Communist government of Armenia and the AGBU in April–May 1930, for the "construction of Nubarashen residential settlement". Soon after in the same year, the construction process was launched at the south of Yerevan, based on the urban plan designed by architect Alexander Tamanian.

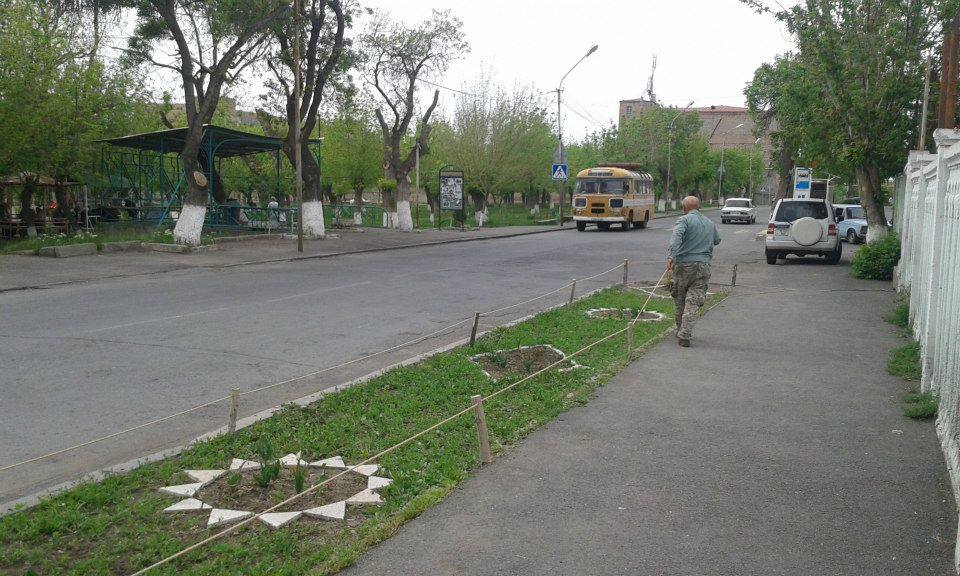
The main street in Nubarashen

In July 1931, around 100-120 residential buildings were ready to put in service. In 1932, the settlement was officially founded and named Nubarashen (meaning town of Nubar). The first residents of the newly founded settlement were repatriated Armenian families from Greece, followed by genocide survivals from Bulgaria, France, Lebanon and Syria. Almost 50% of the project was completed by the end of 1936. In summer 1937, around 1,000 repatriated Armenians were living in Nubarashen.

In 1938, the settlement was renamed as Sovetashen (Armenian: Սովետաշեն), meaning the Soviet town. In 1961, the Ordzhonikidze raion (Орджоникидзевский район) was formed as an administrative district within the city of Yerevan. In 1963, Sovetashen was given the status of an urban-type settlement to become part of the Ordzhonikidze raion.

In 1989, the district was renamed back with its original name. With the 1996 administrative division reforms of Armenia, Nubarashen was given the status of a district within the capital Yerevan.

== Demographics ==
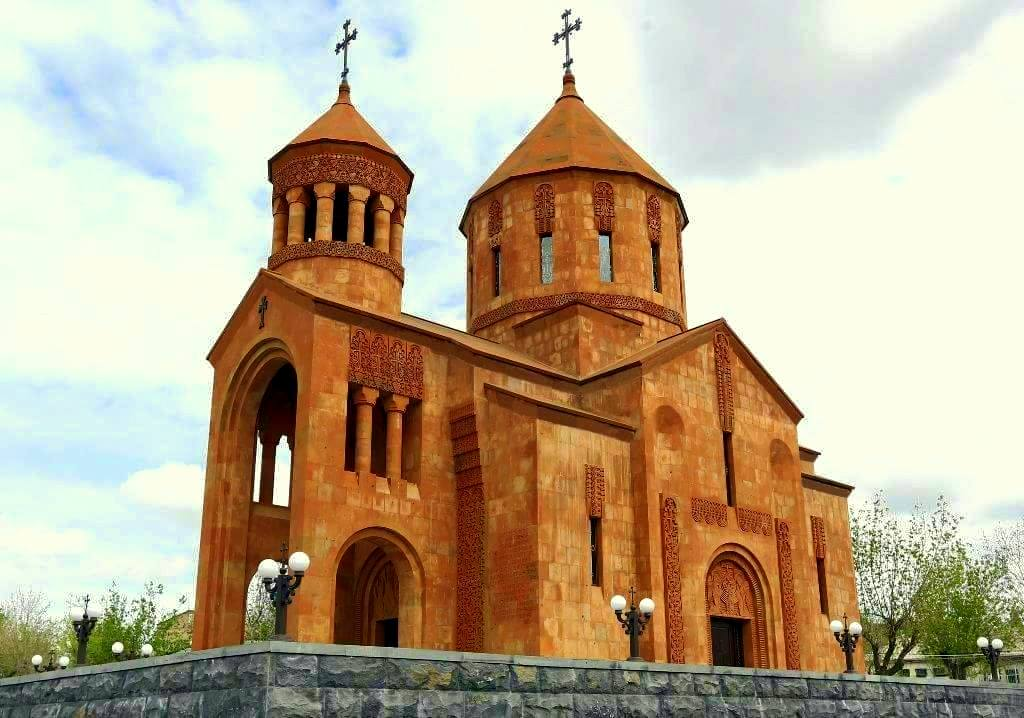
Holy Martyrs Church

As of the 2022 census, the district had a population of 11,794, which is 1.09% of Yerevan city population and ranked 11th among the Yerevan districts. Nubarashen is mainly populated by Armenians who belong to the Armenian Apostolic Church. The district is home to the Holy Martyrs Church opened on April 25, 2015, in commemoration of the 100th anniversary of the Armenian genocide. The construction was launched in 2012 and completed in 2015. The church was designed by architect Artak Ghulyan, while the funds were donated by Gagik Tsarukyan.

== Culture ==
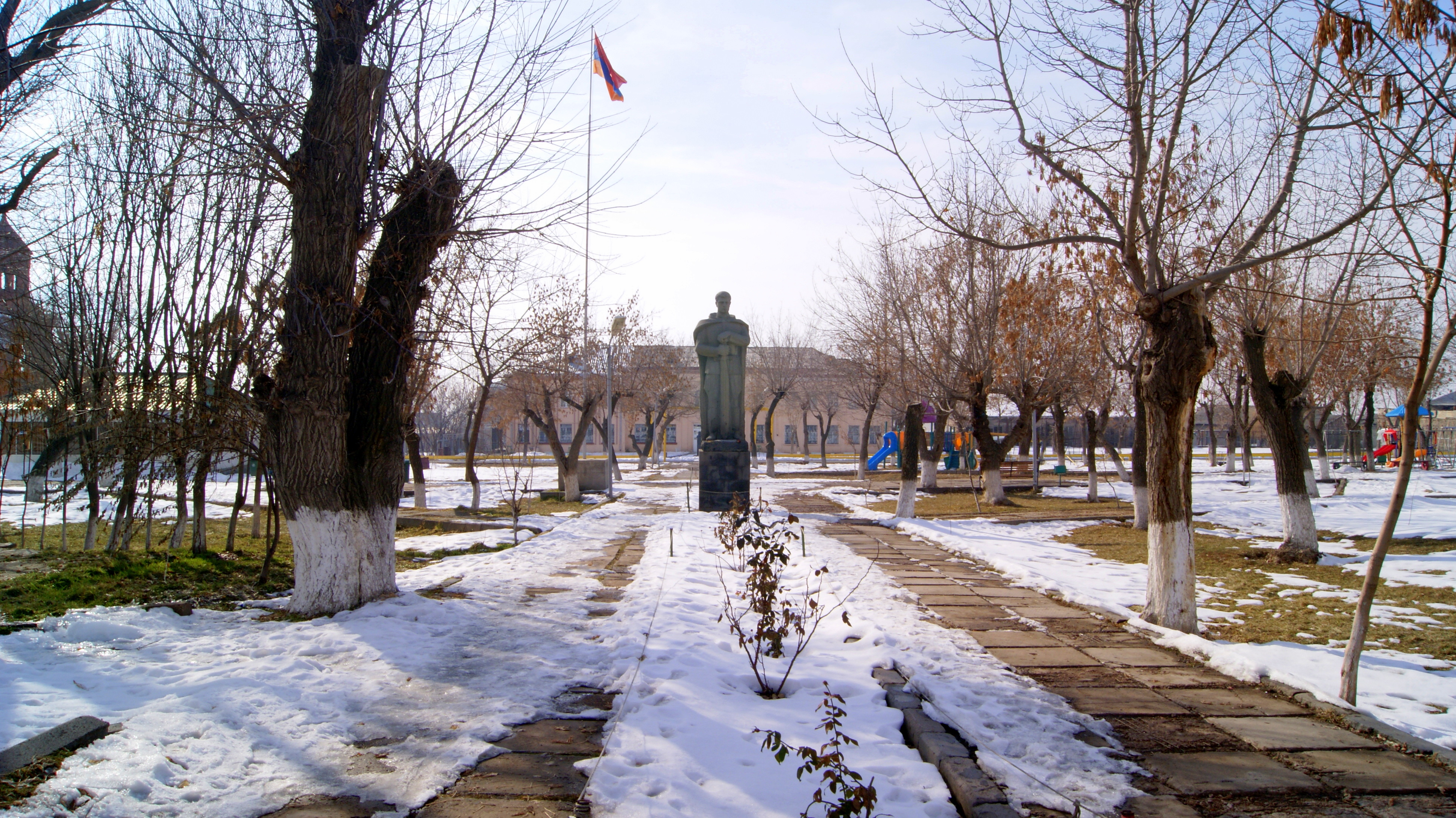
World War II memorial at the central park

The Nubarashen Music School is operating since 1935, while the Nubarashen Library №34 is operating since 1936.

Many monuments are erected in the district, including:

- World War II memorial of Nubarashen, erected in 1973,
- Bust of Ghevont Alishan, erected in 2004,
- Kackhkar memorial for the victims of the First Nagorno-Karabakh War.

== Transportation ==
The Nubarashen Road is the main access that connects the district with the rest of Yerevan, mainly through the Erebuni District. Nubarashen has a direct access with the nearby village of Jrashen which is located to the southwest of the district.

Public transport buses and mini-buses serve the district, securing direct connection with the centre of Yerevan.

== Economy ==
The Nubarashen knitting factory opened in 1958 is among the first industrial plants of the district. In 1982, the Nubarashen furniture factory (currently known as WoodLand) was opened. A branch of the Masis shoe factory was in service during the Soviet days.

Many livestock farms are still operating in the district since the Soviet years, with the largest one being the Nubarashen poultry farm opened in 1971.

After the independence, many food processing factories were opened in the district such as the Eliza and Gohar canned food factory opened in 2000, and Hayrenyats Barikner factory for canned fruits and vegetables opened in 2011.

The Nubarashen Psychiatric Medical Center has a capacity of 500 beds.

== Education ==
As of 2016-17, Nubarashen has 2 public education schools, as well as 2 school for children with special needs.

== Sport ==
Nubarashen is home to a number of sport schools, including:

- Sport and Culture center of Nubarashen, opened in 2009, for judo and folk dances.
- Children's and Youth's chess school of Nubarashen, opened in 2016.

== International relations ==
The administration of Nubarashen District has an official cooperation agreement with:

- Arnouville, Île-de-France, France, since 2015.
