= Vardashen, Yerevan =

Vardashen
- Location within Armenia
- Coordinates: 40°08′41″N 44°32′26″E
- Country: Armenia
- Marz (Province): Yerevan
- District: Erebuni
- Time zone: UTC+4 ( )
  - Summer (DST): UTC+5 ( )

Vardashen (Armenian: Վարդաշեն) is a town in the Yerevan Province of Armenia.
