= Argishti, Yerevan =

Argishti
- Location within Armenia
- Coordinates: 40°08′16″N 44°34′18″E
- Country: Armenia
- Marz (Province): Kotayk
- Time zone: UTC+4 ( )
  - Summer (DST): UTC+5 ( )

Argishti is a neighborhood in the Erebuni District of Yerevan, Armenia. It is very close by Verin Jrashen.

== See also ==
- Kotayk Province
