= Ben Hansen Park =

Park in Wisconsin Rapids, United States

Coordinates: 44°22′30″N 89°50′56″W

Ben Hansen Park is an urban park located in and administered by the city of Wisconsin Rapids, Wisconsin.

The park has an area of 18.4 acres (7.4 ha). It is adjacent to Lyon Park. Ben Hansen Park was named after Benjamin Hansen, who was credited with beautifying the local riverbanks.
