= Erebuni District =

District in Yerevan, Armenia

Erebuni Էրեբունի
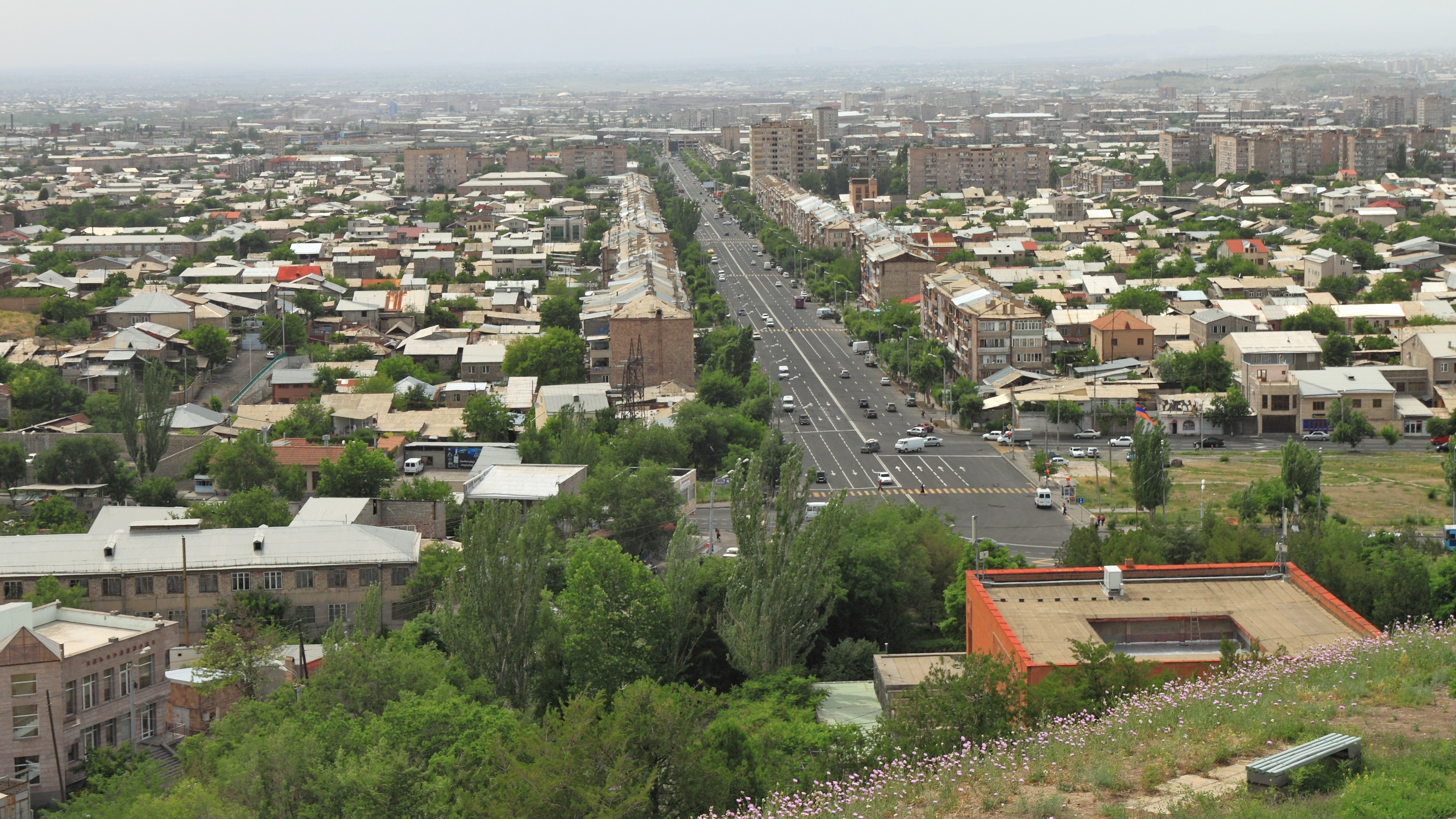
- Erebuni as seen from Erebuni fortress (Arin Berd)

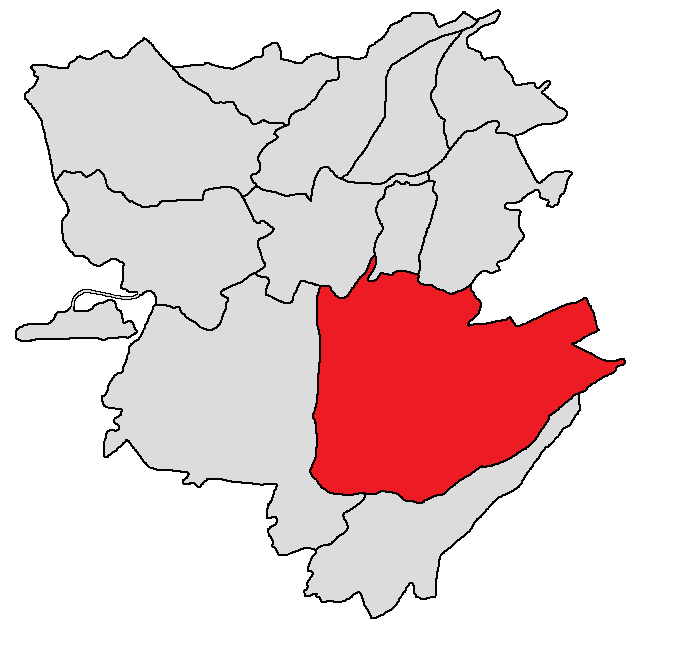
- Coordinates: 40°08′23″N 44°31′40″E
- Country: Armenia
- Marz (Province): Yerevan

Government
  - Mayor of District: Arman Abrahamyan

Area
  - Total: 47.49 km^{2} (18.34 sq mi)
- Elevation: 1,050 m (3,440 ft)

Population (2022 census)
  - Total: 124,957
  - Density: 2,631/km^{2} (6,815/sq mi)
- Time zone: UTC+4 (AMT)

Erebuni (Armenian: Էրեբունի վարչական շրջան, romanized: Erebuni varch’akan shrjan) is one of the 12 districts of Yerevan, the capital of Armenia. It is situated southeast of the city centre where Erebuni Fortress is located. The name of Yerevan itself is derived from ancient Erebuni.

Erebuni is bordered by Shengavit District from the west, Kentron, Nork-Marash and Nor Nork districts from the north, Kotayk Province from the east, Nubarashen district and Kotayk Province from the south.

== Overview ==
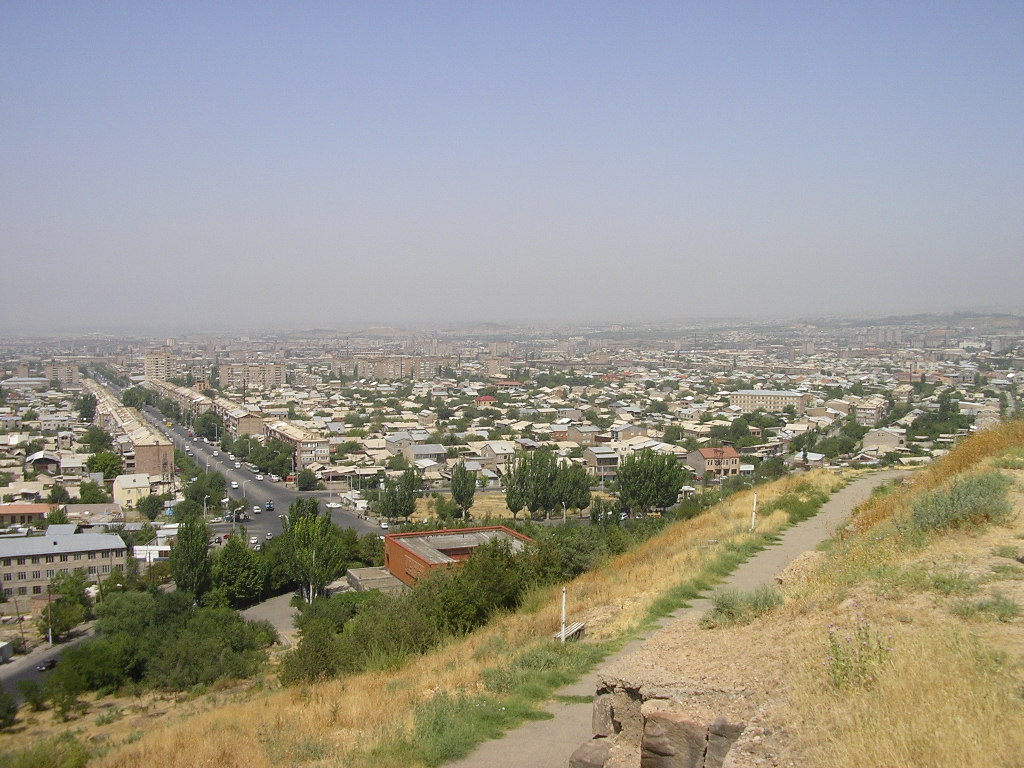
General view of the district with the Erebuni street within the Nor Aresh neighbourhood

Erebuni has an area of 48 km² (21.52% of Yerevan city area), out of which 29 km² are occupied by residential or commercial buildings. Erebuni is the largest district of Yerevan in terms of area. The district is unofficially divided into smaller neighborhoods such as Erebuni, Nor Aresh, Saritagh, Vardashen, Mushavan, Verin Jrashen and Nor Butania. Sasuntsi Davit Square along with the metro station form the core of the district. The main streets of the district are Erebuni Street, Sasuntsi Davit Street, Freedom Fighters' (Azatamartikneri) Street, Ivan Ayvazovsky Street, Rostov-on-Don Street, David Bek Street, Arin Berd Street, Artsakh Avenue (formerly Baku Avenue), and the southern half of Movses Khorenatsi Street.

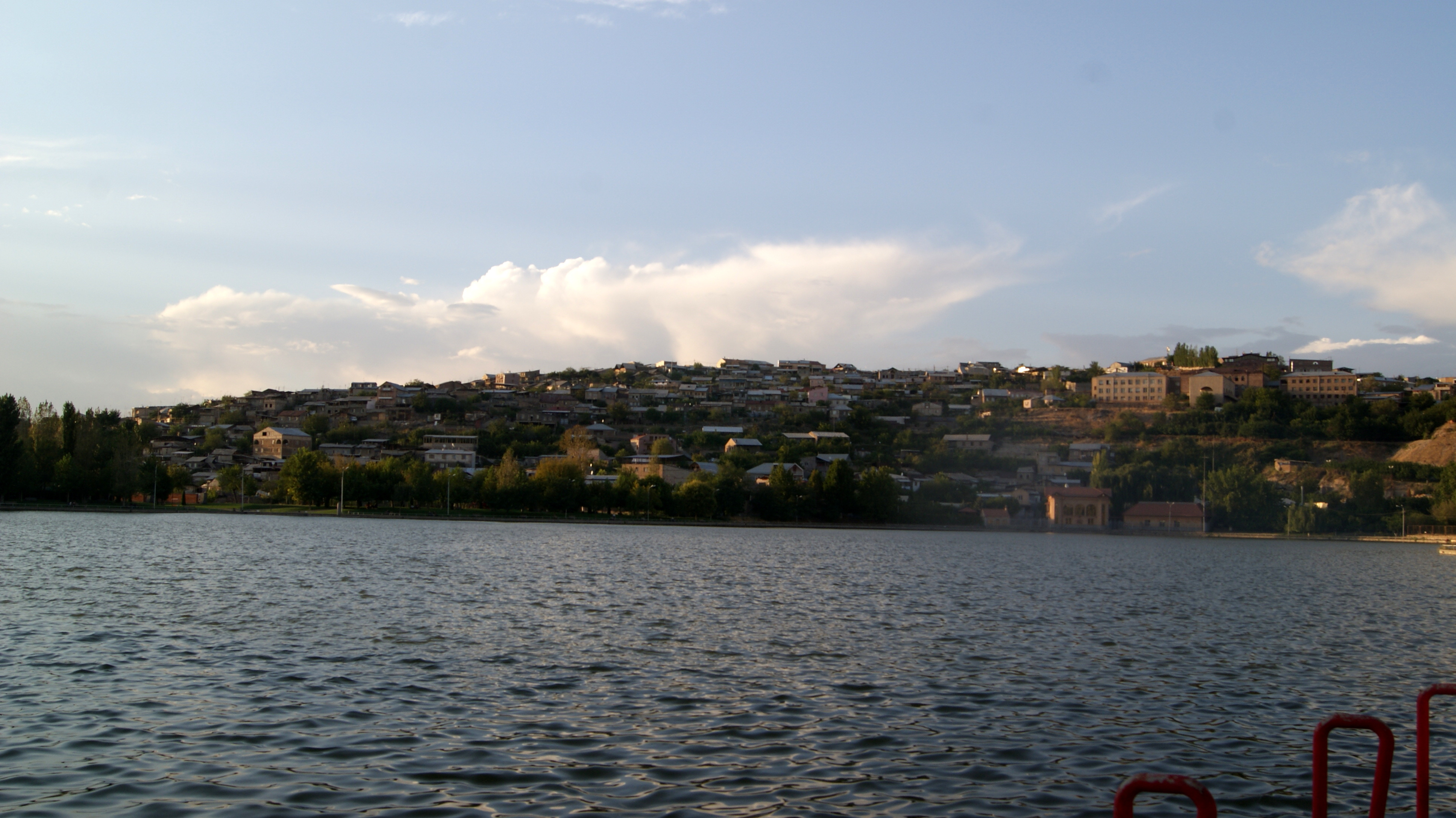
Saritagh neighbourhood of Erebuni

Erebuni is a highly industrialized district within Yerevan with many large factories. However, the district is mainly home to low-income residents of Yerevan.

Recently, many abandoned parks were replenished to become a favourite destination of the residents of the city, such as the Lyon Park and its artificial Vardavar lake, the Liberators' park, etc. The central cemetery of Yerevan as well as the Military cemetery are also located in the Erebuni District.

The district is served by the Sasuntsi Davit metro station, while the Yerevan Railway Station is located on Sasuntsi Davit Square of the district. Erebuni is also home to the central prison of Yerevan, Erebuni Penitentiary Institution.

The Erebuni State Reserve formed in 1981, is located around 8 km southeast of the Yerevan city centre, within the Erebuni District. At a height between 1300 and 1450 meters above sea level, the reserve occupies an area of 120 hectares, mainly consisted of semi-deserted mountains-steppe.

As of 2016, the population of the district is around 126,500.

== History ==
=== Antiquity ===
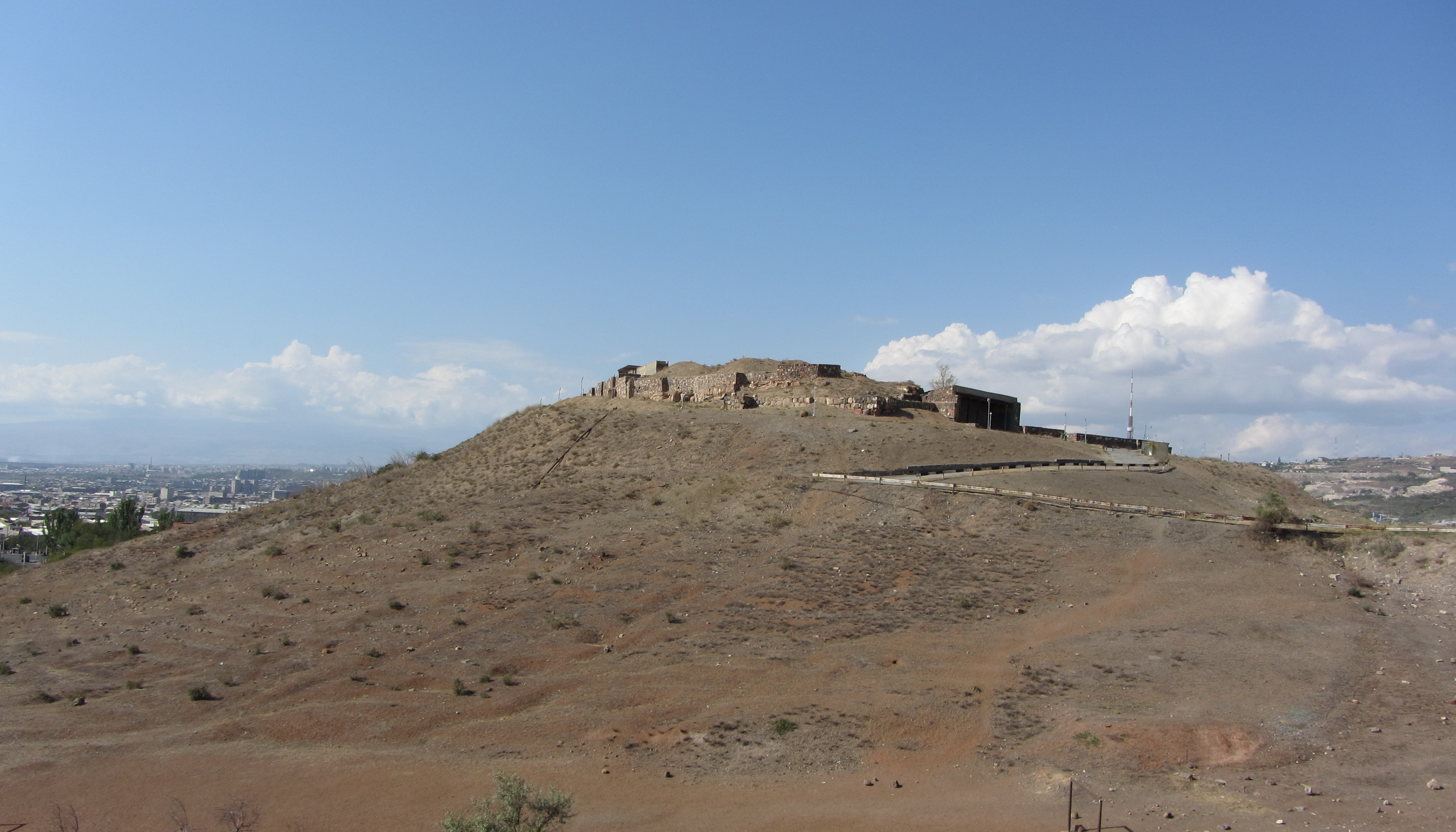
Erebuni Fortress

Archaeological evidence indicates that the Urartian military fortress of Erebuni was founded in 782 BC by the orders of King Argishti I on the Arin-Berd hill within modern-day Erebuni district, to serve as a fort and citadel guarding against attacks from the North Caucasus. During the height of Urartian power, irrigation canals and artificial reservoirs were built in Erebuni and its surrounding territories.

=== Modern history ===
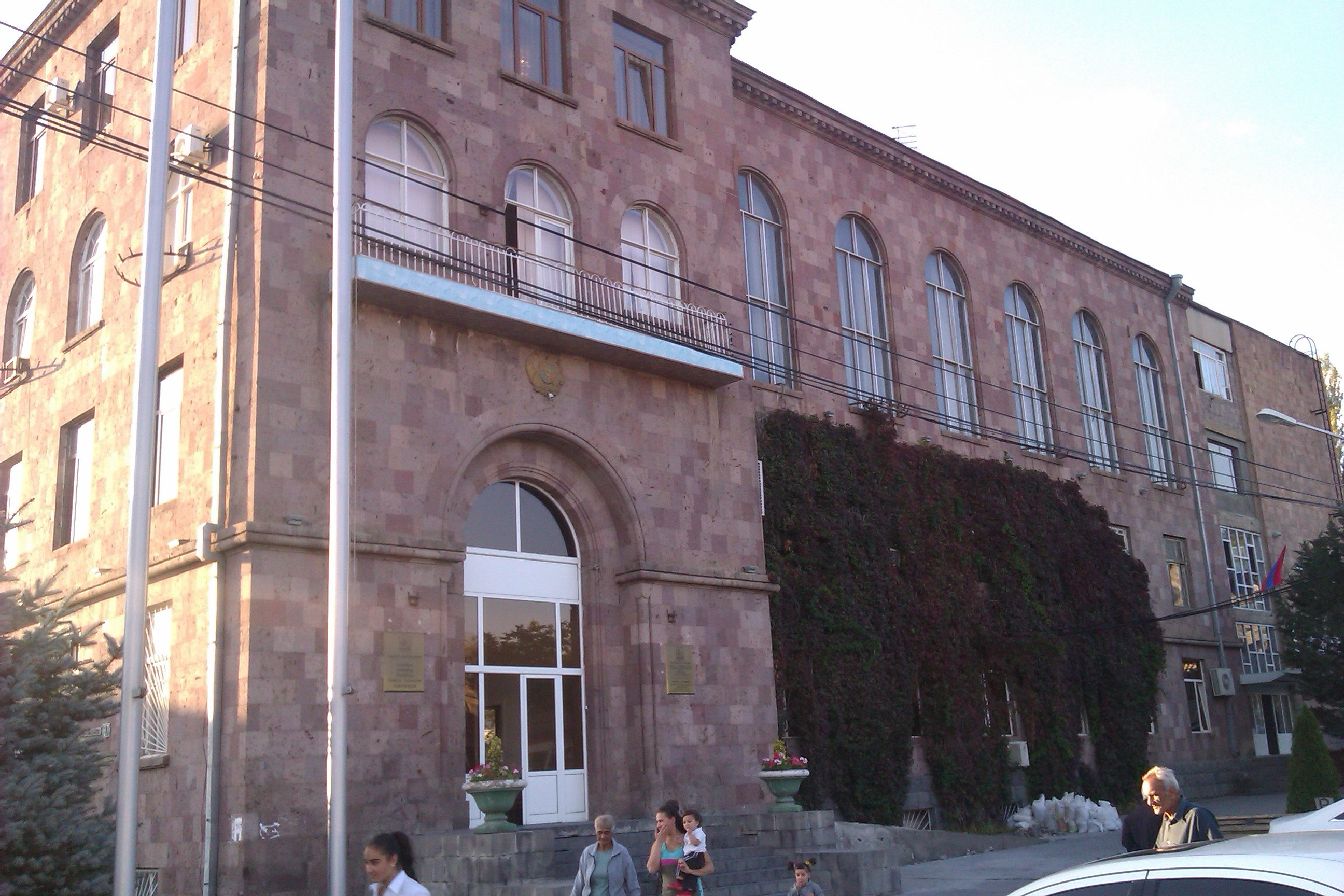
Erebuni District administration

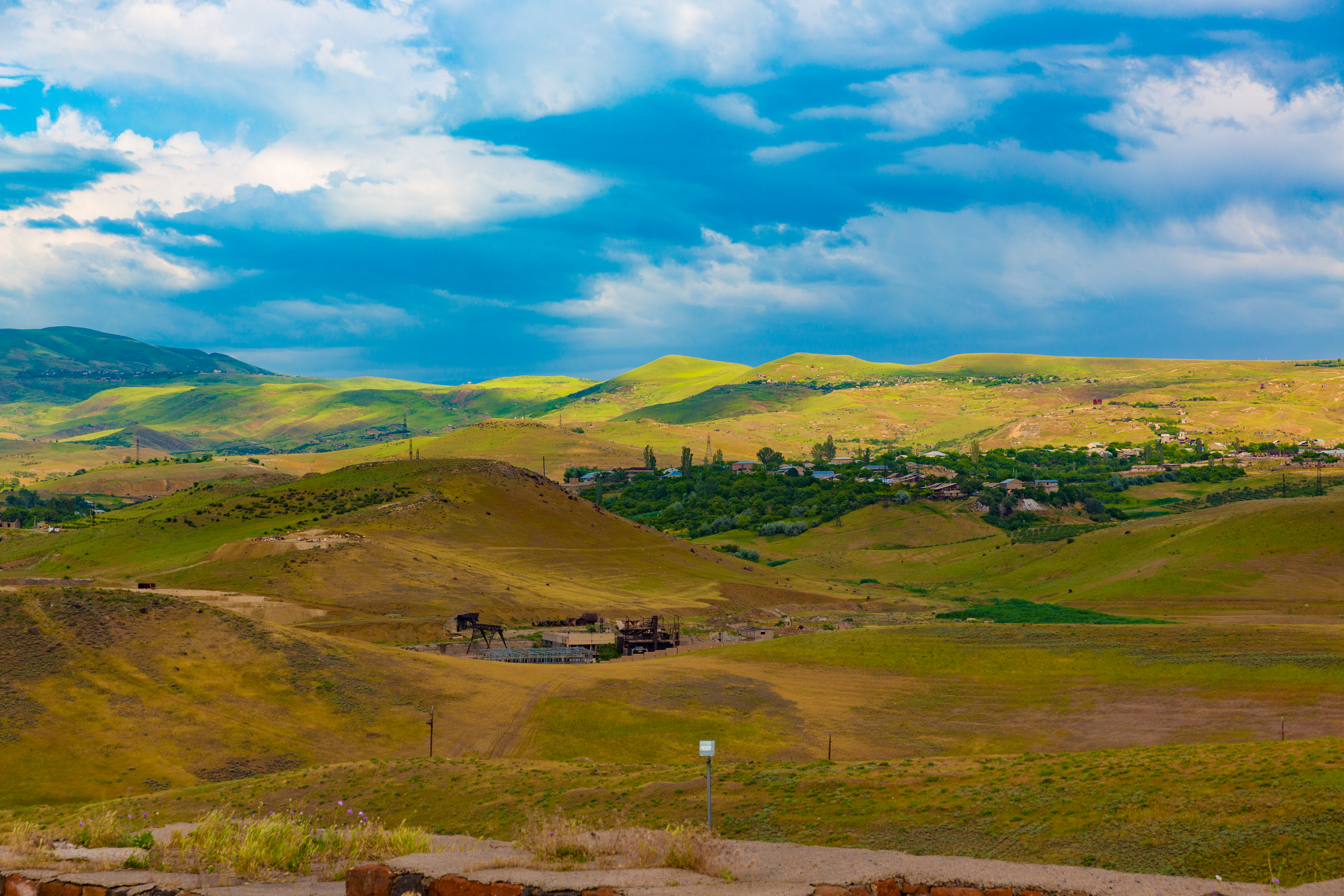
Verin Jrashen and parts of Mushavan

After the Sovietization of Armenia, the administrative area of Erivan (Yerevan) was gradually expanded to include the ancient territories of Erebuni, commonly known as Arin-Berd.

The first settlers of around 60 families of the area were survivors of the Armenian genocide who escaped from the հistorical region of Bithynia (Byut’ania in Armenian). In 1925, they founded the neighborhood of Nor Butania. The neighbourhood of Nor Aresh was named after the ancient Armenian town of Aresh. The first inhabitants of Nor Aresh arrived from Nukha, Azerbaijan.

On 20 July 1939, a new district was formed in Yerevan called as the Molotov raion. On 25 September 1957, the district was renamed after as the Lenin raion. On 13 November 1961, a new district was formed on parts of modern-day Erebuni District, called the Ordzhonikidze raion.

As a result of the Armenian repatriation process, Nor Aresh and Vardashen neighbourhoods were resettled by Armenian migrants from Syria, Lebanon, Greece, France, Bulgaria and Egypt, during the 1950s and 1960s.

Mushavan and Verin Jrashen, originally villages at the eastern outskirts of Yerevan, were eventually absorbed by the city in 1965.

On 8 August 1991, based on a decision passed by the National Assembly of Armenia, the territory of the Lenin raion was renamed Erebuni. In 1996, Yerevan was divided into 12 local communities. In 1997, the territory of Erebuni District was defined to include the former Lenin raion and parts of the former Ordzhonikidze raion.

== Demographics ==
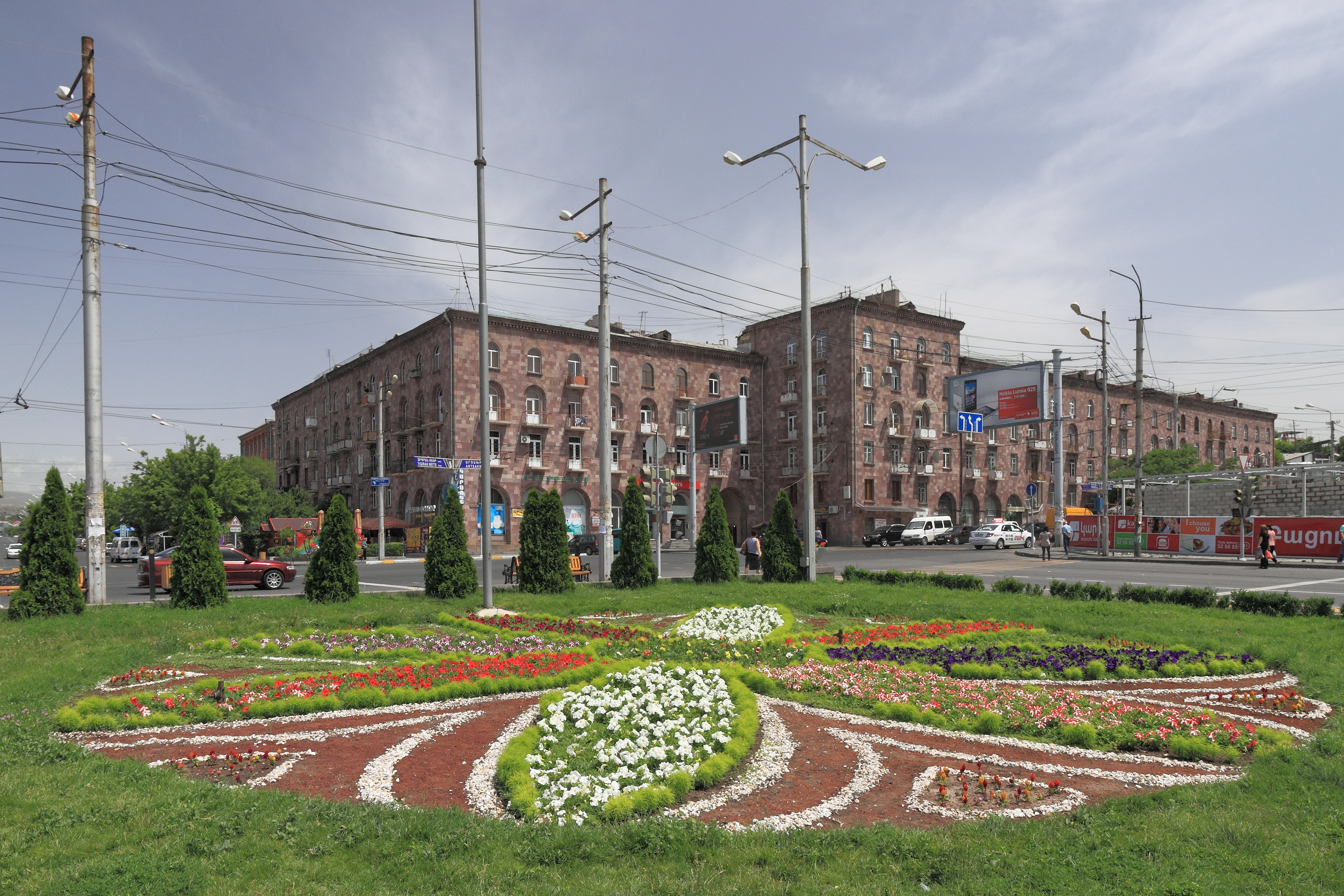
Street view in Erebuni

As of the 2022 census, the district had a population of 124,957, which is 11.5% of Yerevan city population and ranked 4th among the Yerevan districts.

Until 1988, Erebuni had around 3,000 Azeri minority. However, the vast majority of the members of the Azeri community fled to Azerbaijan as a result of the population exchange during the First Nagorno-Karabakh War.

Currently, Erebuni is mainly populated by Armenians who belong to the Armenian Apostolic Church. The Surp Mesrop Mashtots Church of the district has been under construction since 2004.

== Culture ==
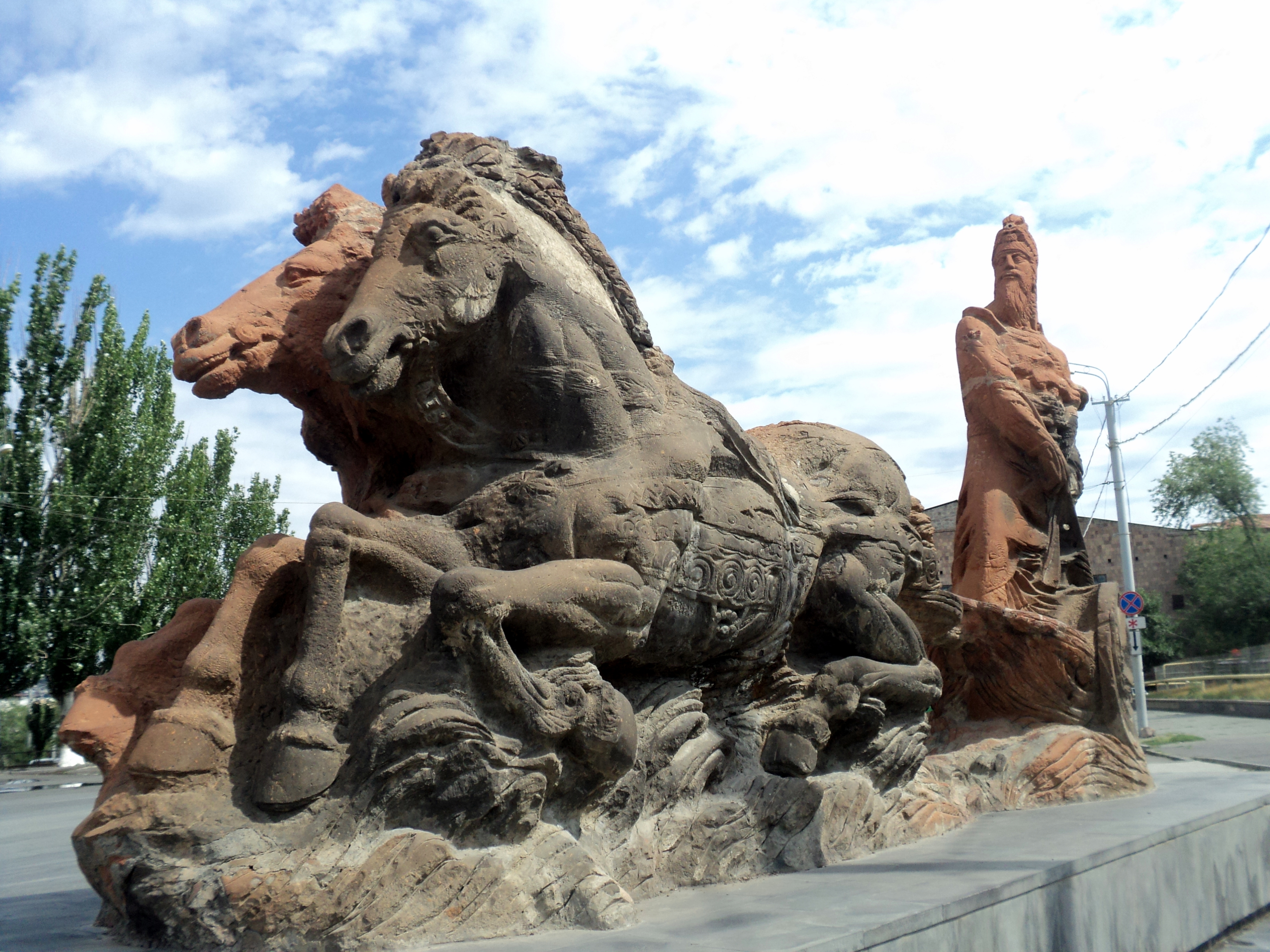
The statue of Argishti I

Erebuni has many public libraries including the Library No. 3 named after Okro Okoryan (1937), Library No. 10 (1951), Library No. 10 (1956), Library No. 11 (1960), and the Music Library (1966). The Children and Youth Creativity Center No. 3 also operates in Erebuni.

Many notable cultural heritage sites are located in the district, including:

- Erebuni Fortress of 782 BC.
- The Urartian water reservoir known as Vardavar Lake in Lyon Park, dating back to the 8th century BC. The park is also home to the first ever Armenian Genocide memorial erected in the city of Yerevan.
- The statue of David of Sasun near the railway station, erected in 1959.
- The statue of Argishti I near the Erebuni Museum, erected in 2002.

=== Museums ===
- Erebuni Museum near the Erebuni Fortress, opened in 1968,
- Railway Museum of Armenia within the Yerevan Railway Station, opened in 2009.

== Transportation ==
Erebuni District is served by a public transport network of buses and trolleybuses. It also has the Sasuntsi Davit station of the Yerevan underground metro, operating since March 7, 1981.

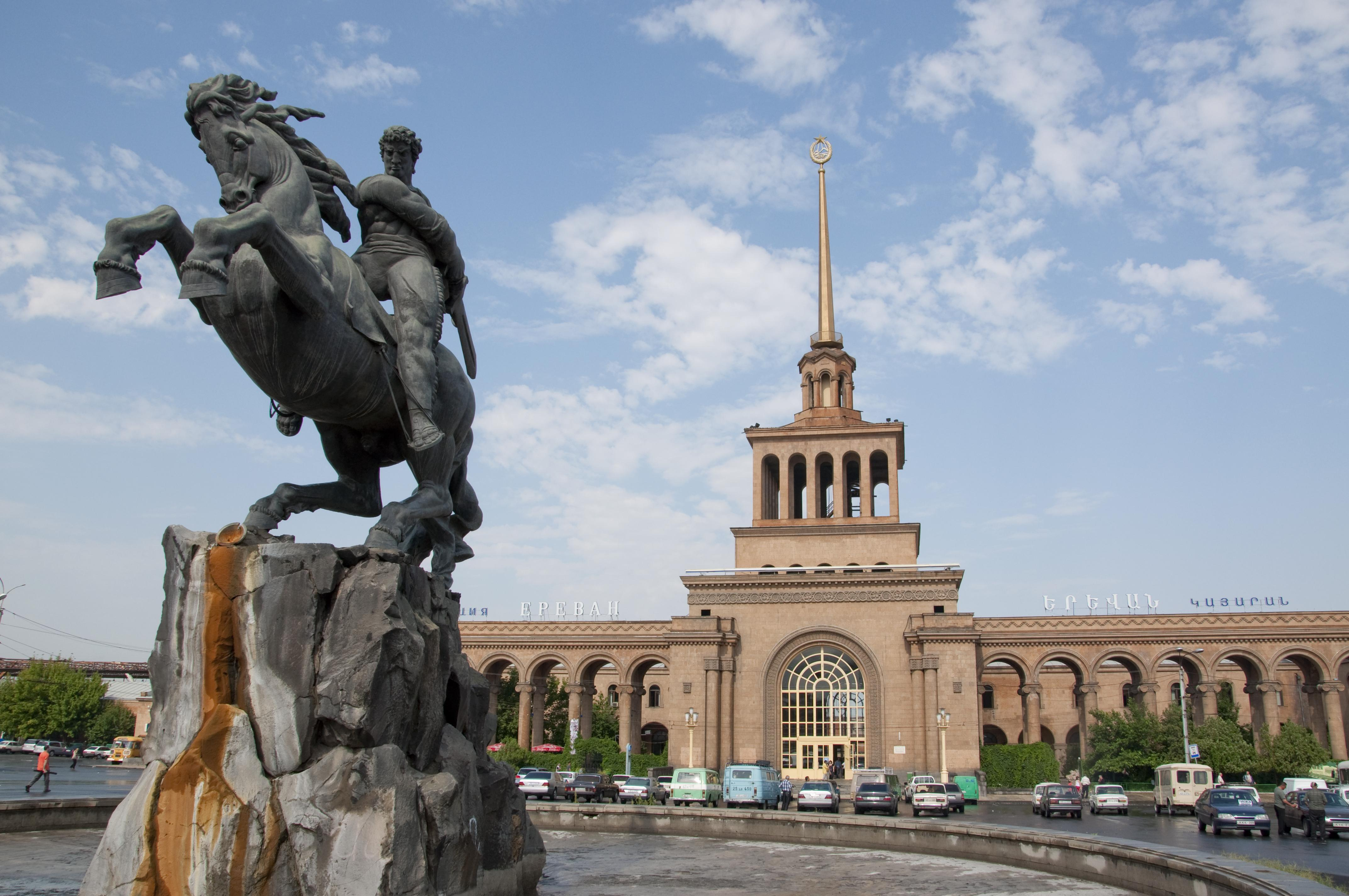
Sasuntsi Davit Square and the Yerevan Railway Station

The Yerevan Railway Station in Erebuni was built in 1956; the railway has existed since 1902. It connects Yerevan with many other stations as listed below:

- Yerevan — Batumi
- Yerevan — Tbilisi
- Yerevan — Gyumri
- Yerevan — Ararat
- Yerevan — Araks railway station in Myasnikyan,
- Yerevan — Yeraskh.

Erebuni District is home to the second airport of Yerevan, the Erebuni Airport. Since Armenia gained its independence, Erebuni Airport has mainly been used for military or private flights. The Armenian Air Force has a base there and there are several MiG-29s stationed on Erebuni's tarmac.

== Economy ==
=== Industry ===
Erebuni has a large industrial area in the southern part of the district. Many large industrial plants have operated there since the Soviet era. Gajegorts plant for building materials is among the oldest firms opened in the district during the Soviet period. It is operating since 1930. The Yerevan meat processing factory (currently known as Urartu) was opened in 1932. It was followed by the Yerevan varnish and paint plant in 1948. In 1955, the Mixed Fodder Factory was opened. In 1965, the Metal Structures Plant was opened, followed by the Pure Iron Plant in 1969. In 1990, the Armenuhi-90 Chemical Products Cooperative was opened.

After Armenia gained its independence, many new plants were founded in Erebuni such as the Global Engineering Company for metal structures in 1992, Bari Samaratsi meat processing factory in 1994, Nikol Duman metal casting factory in 1996, Mancho Group for food products in 1999, Mix-Paints for building materials in 1999, Paxan Yerevan plant for household chemicals in 2000, Narplast polymer container manufacturing enterprise in 2002, the Armenian Molybdenum Production Plant in 2003, Newlita stone processing plant in 2003, the Armenian Titanium Production in 2007, the Armenian Travertine Mining Company in 2007, Astafian Wine-Brandy Factory in 2008, and Chipsella for food products in 2002.

=== Services ===
There many large shopping centres in the district such as the Erbeuni shopping centre and Eurobaza shopping centre. Erebuni Medical Center, opened in 1983, is among the largest hospitals of Yerevan. The Central Military Hospital is also located in Erebuni District. A pig-breeding farm was opened in the district in 2000.

== Education ==
As of 2018, the district has 21 public schools, 3 private schools, 2 vocational schools as well as a school for children with special needs. There is also an Art School Named after Michael Maluntsyan, and a music school named after Tigran Chukhajyan.

== Sport ==
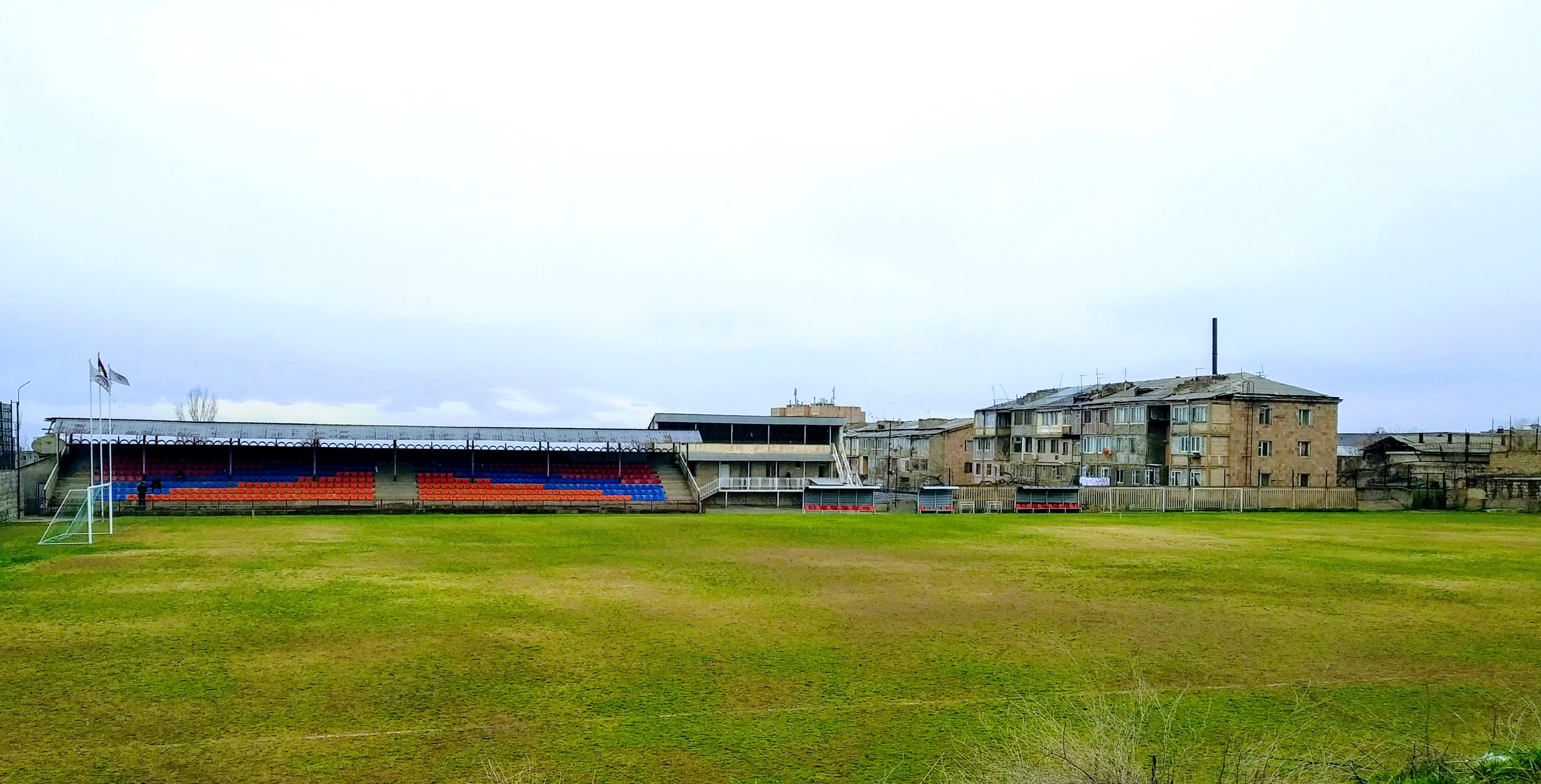
Hmayak Khachatryan Stadium

- Erebuni-Homenmen FC, a defunct football club that played in the Armenian football league competitions between 1992 and 2000.
- Erebuni SC, adefunct football club that played in the Armenian football league competitions between 2007 and 2019.

The Hmayak Khachatryan Stadium of Erebuni with a capacity of 544 seats was the home venue of the teams that represented the district.

The Vardavar artificial lake of the district is frequently used for windsurfing. In 2015, the Children and Youth Chess Sport School of Erebuni was opened.

== International relations ==
The administration of Erebuni District has an official cooperation agreement with Vienne, Isère, France since 2015.

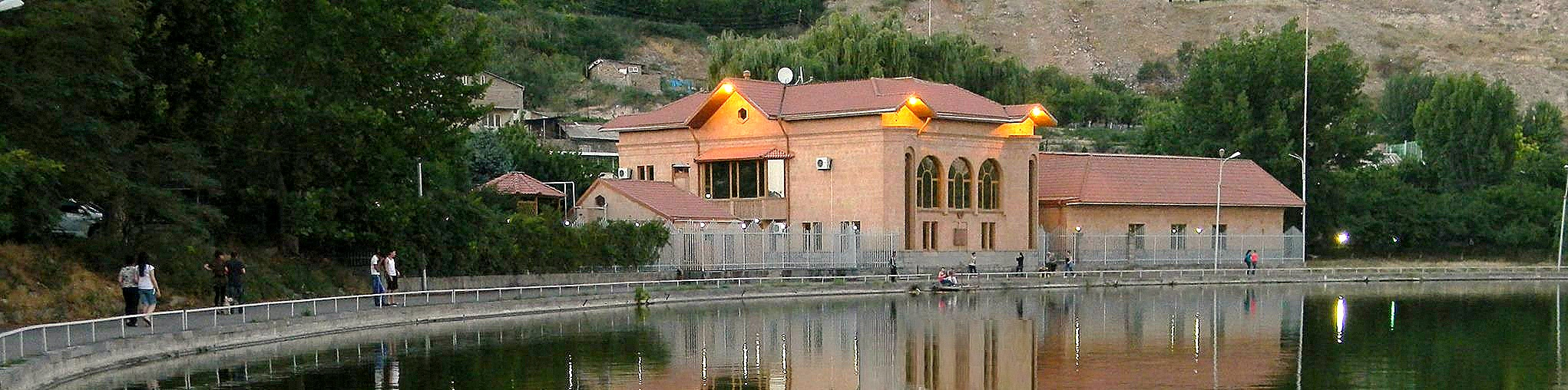
Vardavar lake at the Lyon Park of Erebuni District
