= Lyon Park, Yerevan =

Park in Yerevan, Armenia

Lyon Park
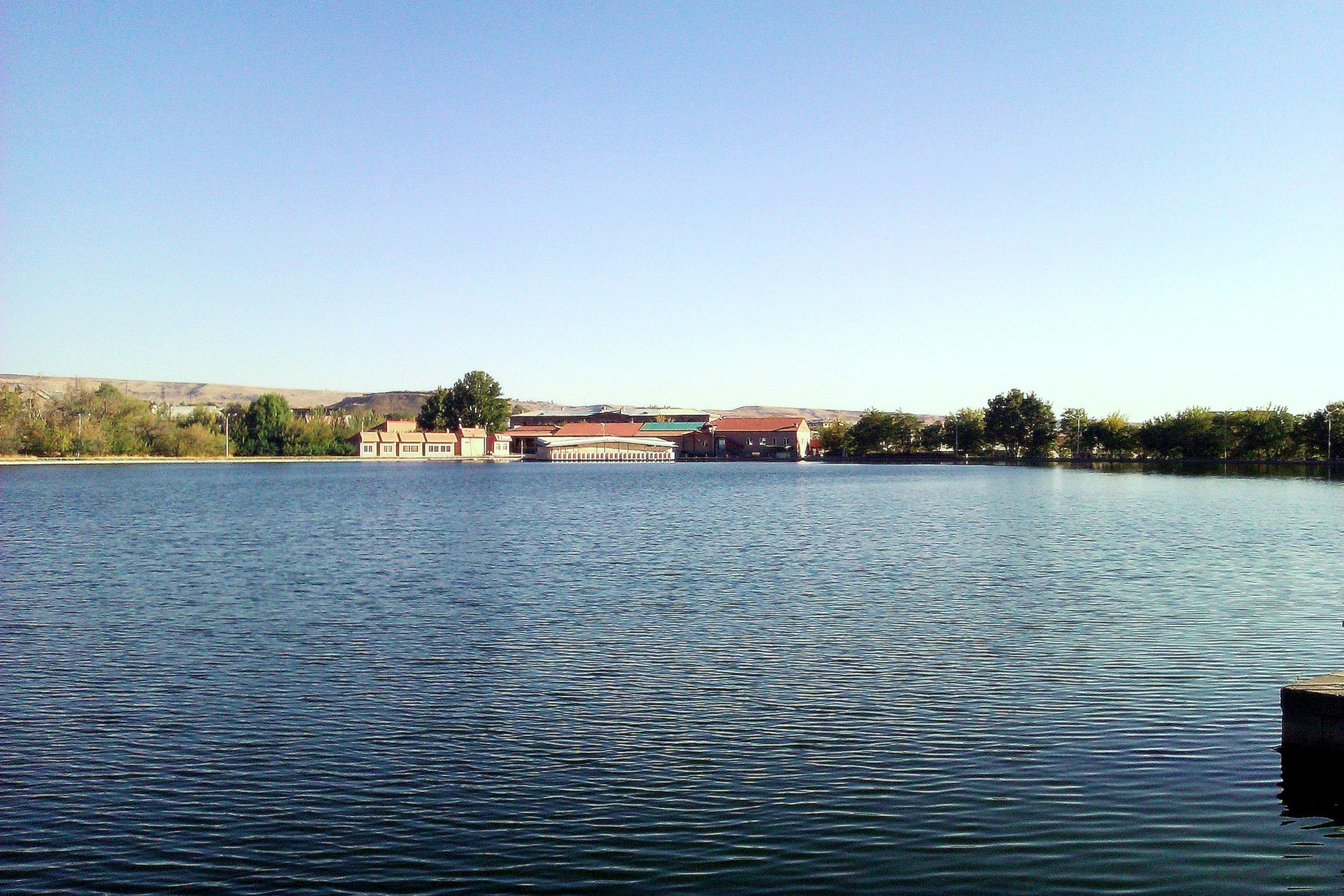
- Lyon Park of Yerevan and Vardavar lake
- Interactive map of Lyon Park
- Type: Public park
- Location: Erebuni District, Yerevan, Armenia
- Coordinates: 40°09′14″N 44°31′39″E
- Area: 17 hectares (42 acres)
- Created: 8th century BC (founded); 21 July 2011 (reopened)
- Operator: Yerevan City Council
- Status: Open all year

Lyon Park (Armenian: Լիոնի այգի, romanized: Lioni agyi), popularly known as Tokhmakh Park (Armenian: Թոխմախի այգի), is a public park in the Armenian capital of Yerevan. It occupies an area of 17 hectares in the eastern Erebuni District of the capital city. It is home to an artificial lake called Vardavar, covering an area of 8 hectares.

== Description ==
In 2010–2011, the park was entirely renovated by the direct assistance of the Lyon City Council. It was reopened in July 2011 with the presence of the mayor of Lyon Gérard Collomb and then-mayor of Yerevan Karen Karapetyan. The park was renamed after the city of Lyon to become a symbol of the partnership between the two cities.

The artificial lake dates back to the period of king Argishti I of Urartu in the 8th century BC. In 1578, the lake was renovated by the Safavid governor of Yerevan Mohammad Khan Tokhmaq, and since then it has been known as Tokhmakh Lake. During the Soviet period, the lake was renamed to Komsomol Lake (Komeritmiut’yan lich), after the youth wing of the Communist Party. The lake was renamed Vardavar in 2000.

The lake, with an 8-hectare water surface, is frequently used for SUP-boarding and windsurfing.

== Gallery ==
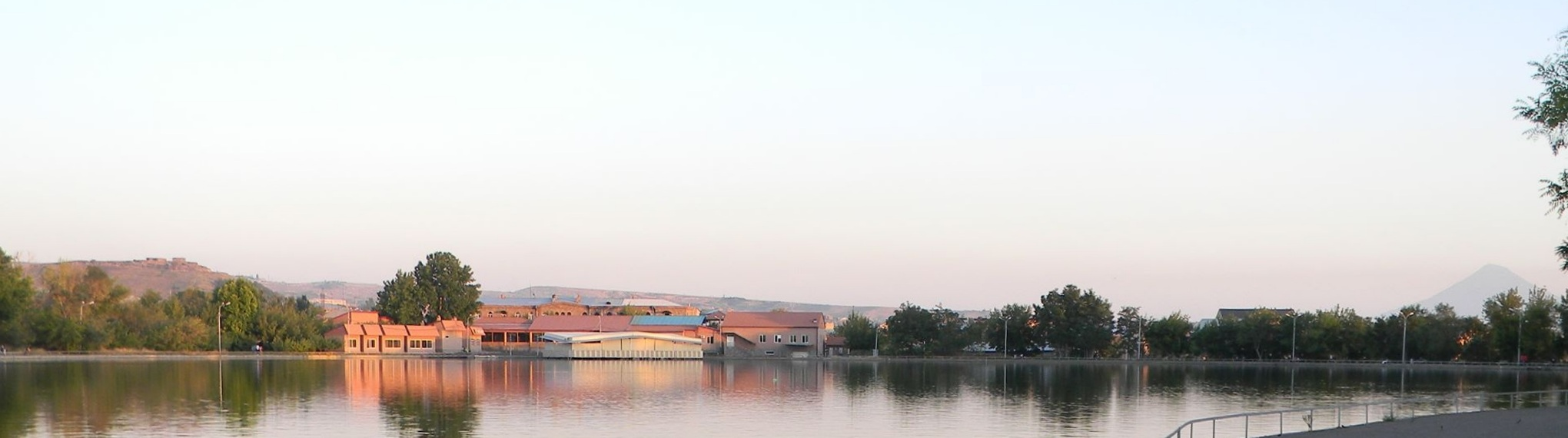
Vardavar lake at the Lyon park of Yerevan

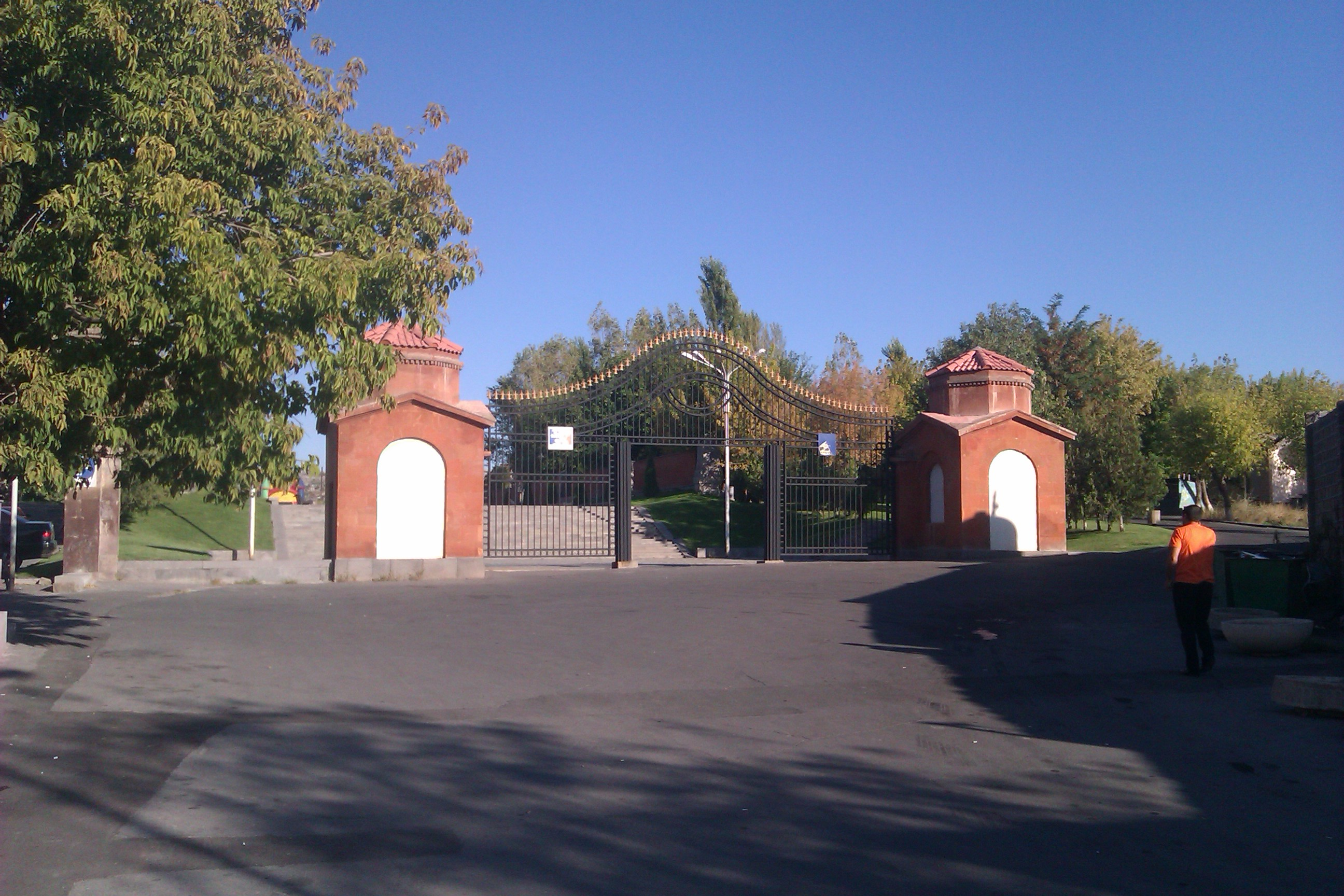
The main entrance to the park

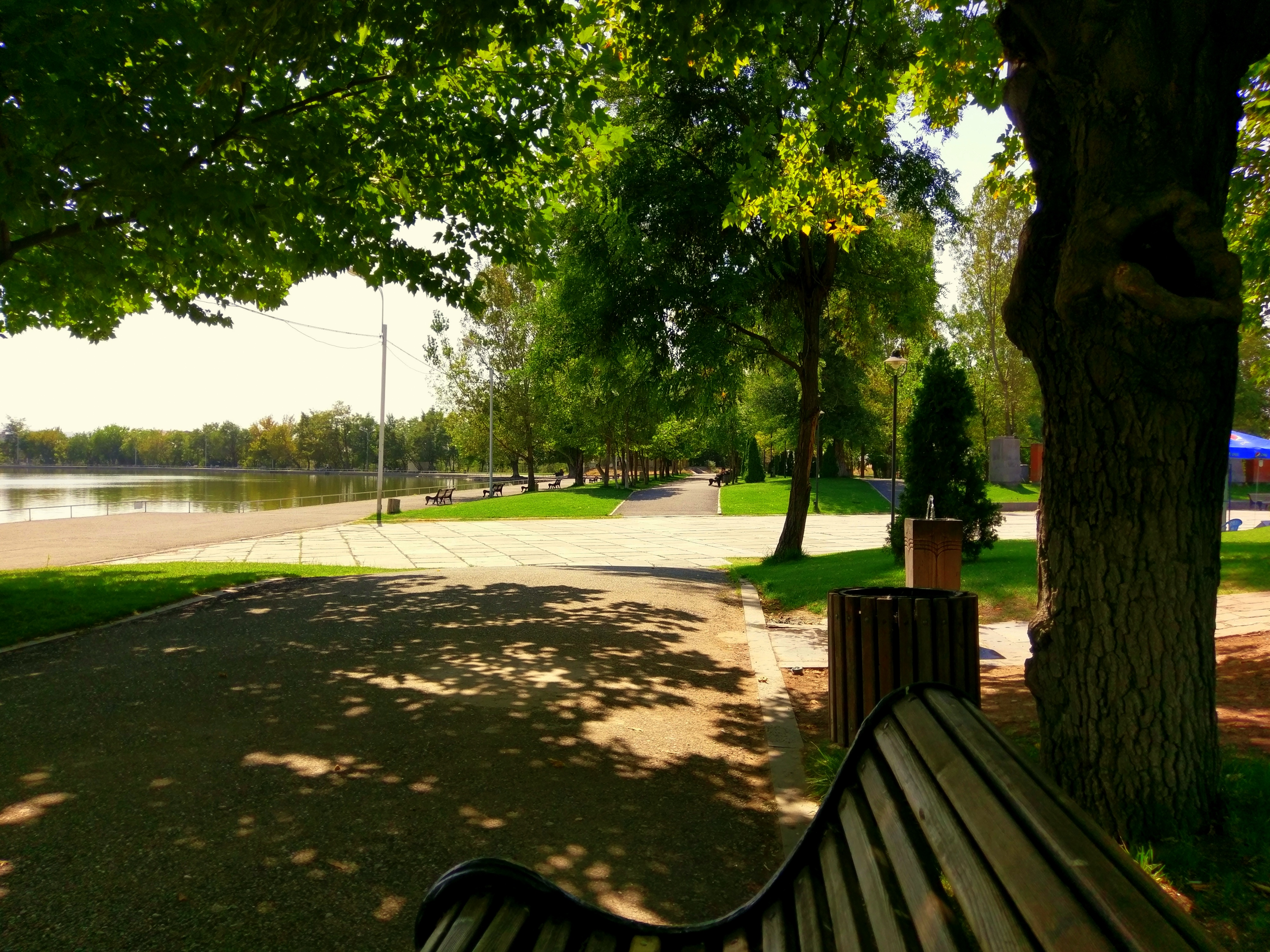
At the park

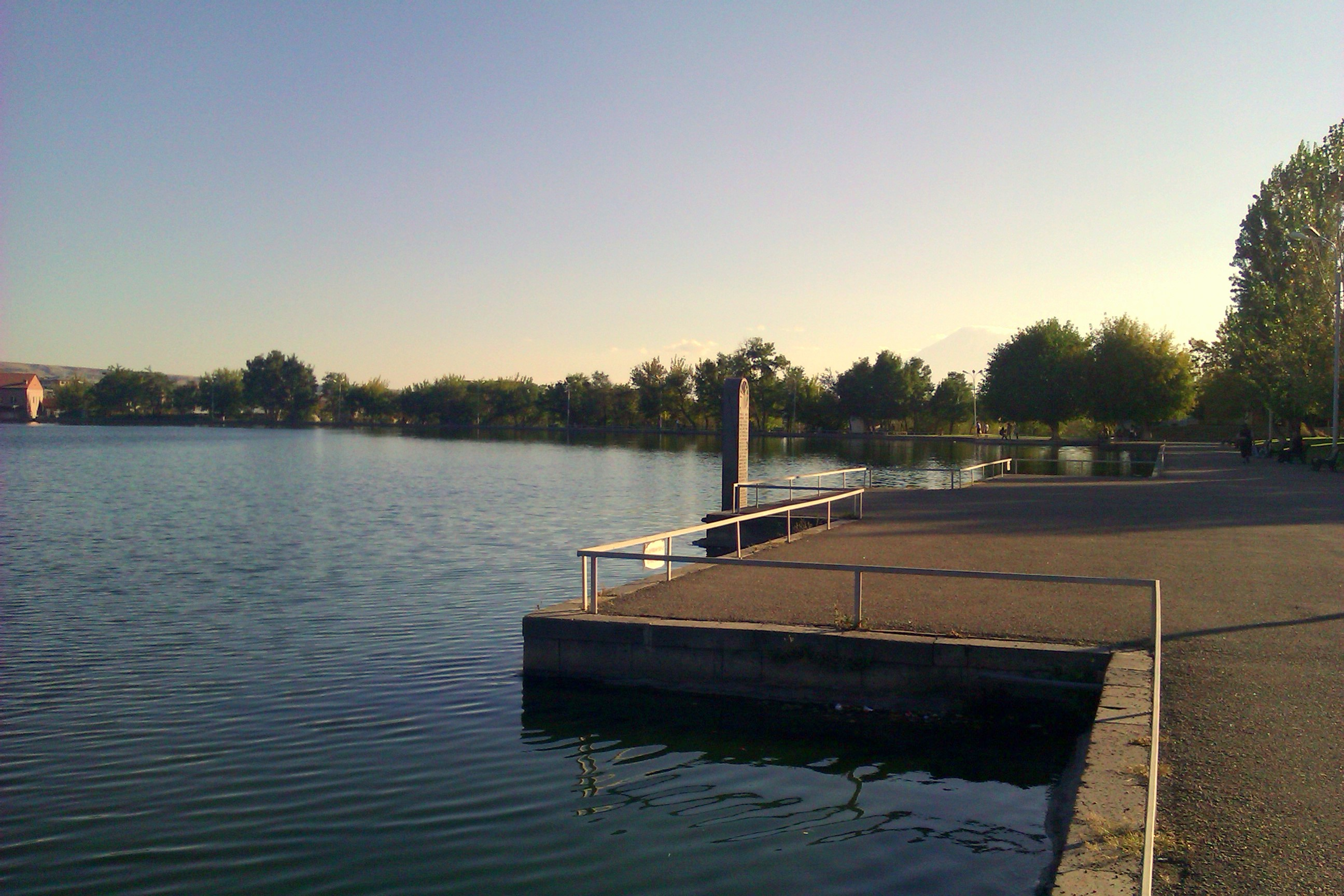
Dusk time

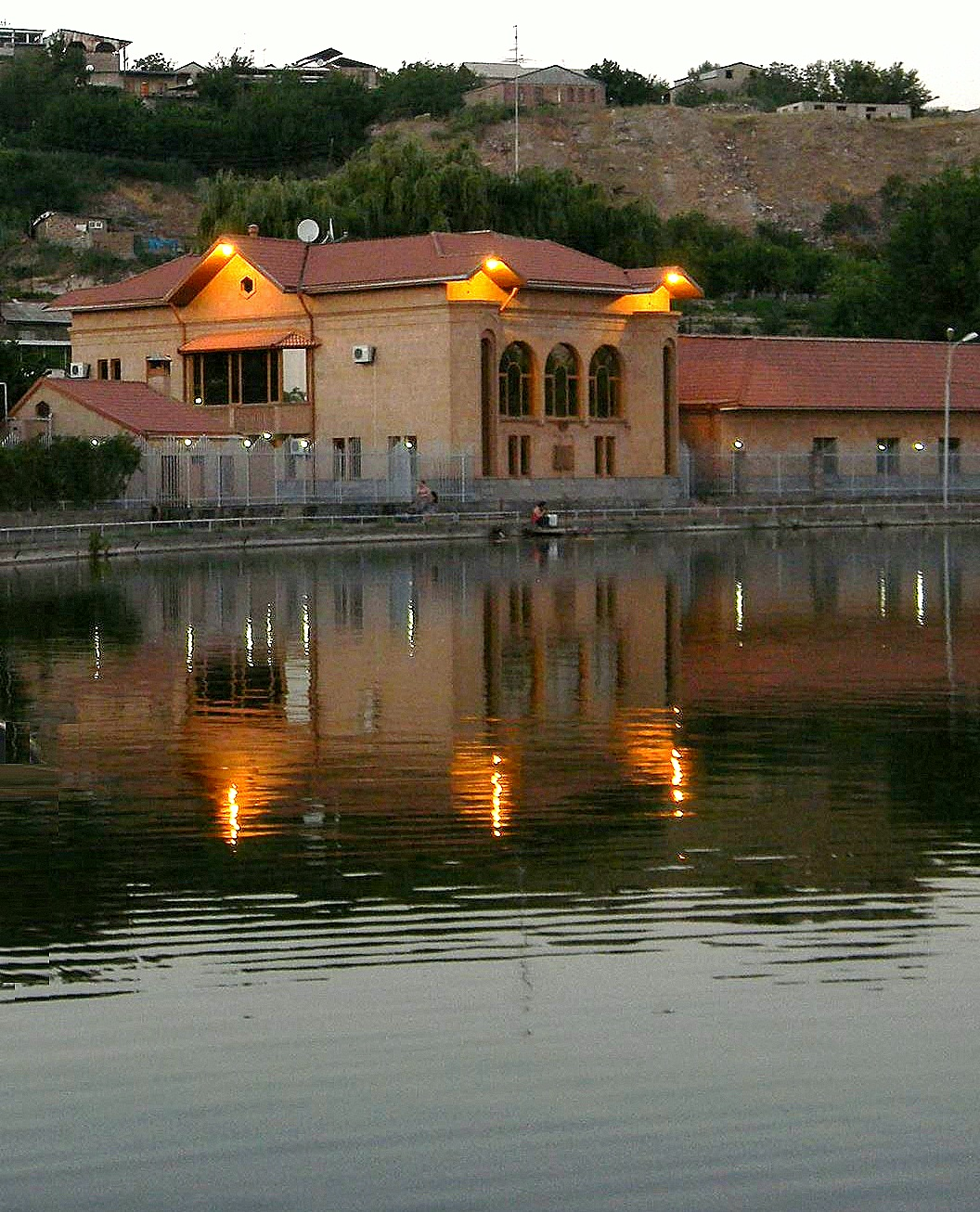
Vardavar lake
