= Saint Sarkis Cathedral, Yerevan =

Cathedral in Yerevan, Armenia

Saint Sarkis Cathedral Սուրբ Սարգիս Մայր Եկեղեցի
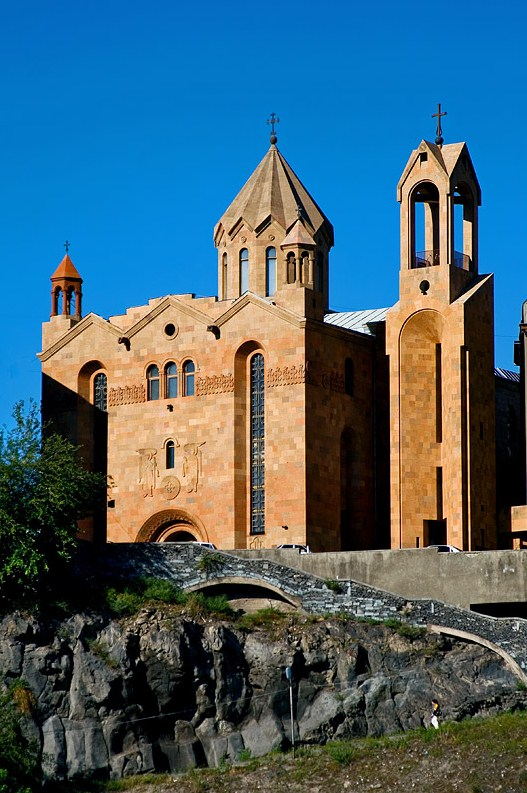
- Saint Sarkis Cathedral

- Location within Armenia

Religion
- Affiliation: Armenian Apostolic Church
- Year consecrated: 1842
- Status: active

Location
- Location: corner of Mesrop Mashtots and Israyelian streets, Kentron District, Yerevan, Armenia
- Coordinates: 40.176980°N 44.502148°E

Architecture
- Style: Armenian

Saint Sarkis Cathedral (Armenian: Սուրբ Սարգիս Մայր Եկեղեցի (Surp Sarkis Mayr Yekeghetsi)) is an Armenian cathedral in Yerevan, Armenia. It is the seat of the Araratian Pontifical Diocese of the Armenian Apostolic Church. It was built in 1842, on the left bank of the Hrazdan River in Yerevan's Kentron District.

== History ==
Standing against the upper part of the village of Dzoragyugh, and facing the old Erivan Fortress on the left bank of the River Hrazdan, a hermitage-monastery was functioning since the earliest Christian era. This spacious complex, surrounded by a high, fortified wall, was made up of the churches of Saints Sarkis, Gevork and Hakob churches, of the buildings of the patriarchal offices and school, of an orchard and of other buildings. Saint Sarkis Church was the official seat of the Patriarch, whereas the monastery was the patriarchal inn for the guests. Saint Sarkis Church, with the hermitage-monastery, was destroyed by the large earthquake of 1679 but was rebuilt on the same site during the rule of Edesatsi Nahabet Catholicos (1691–1705).

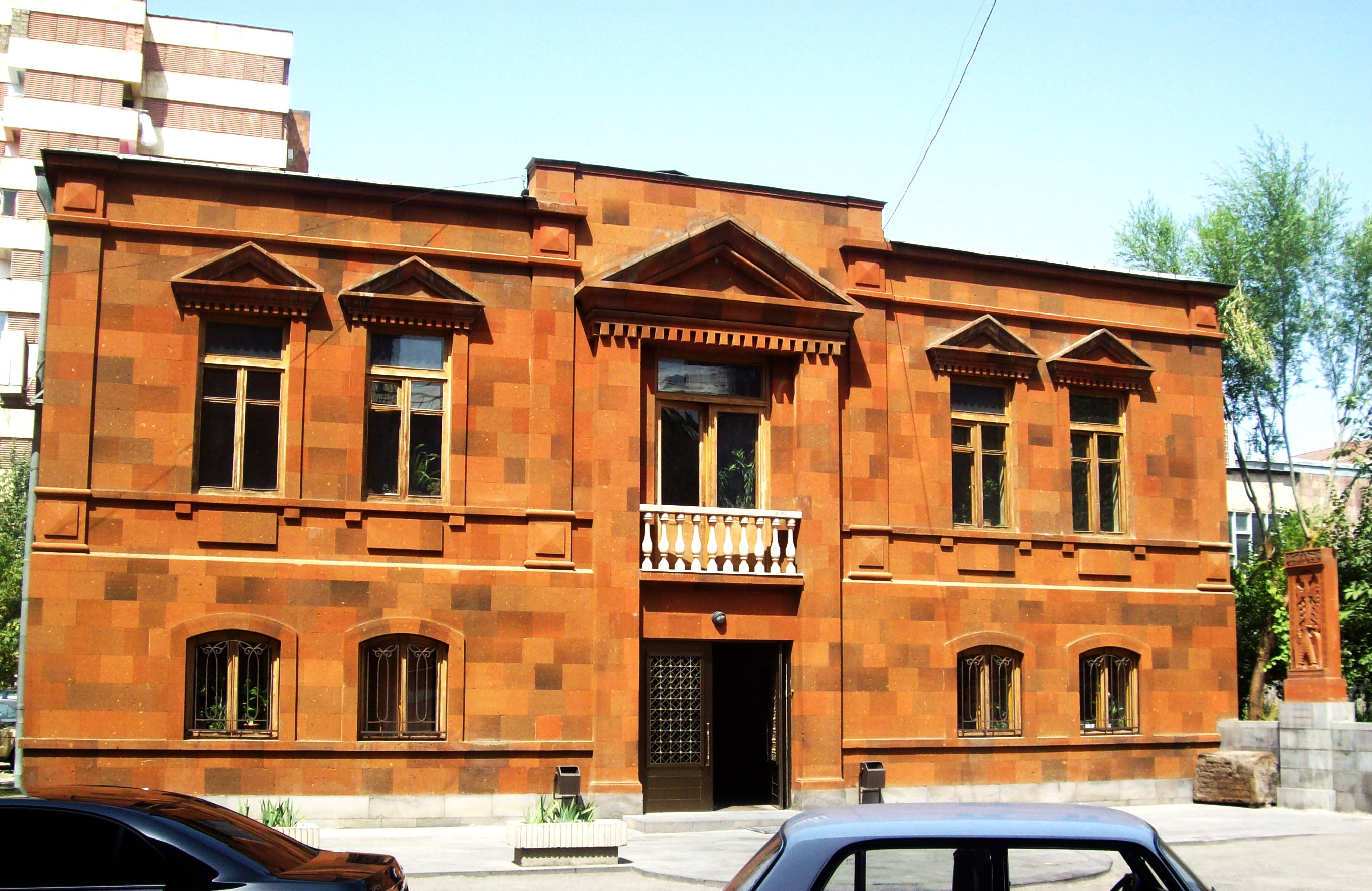
The prelacy building of the Araratian Pontifical Diocese at the church yard, designed by architect Artsruni Galikyan

However, the current building of the church was constructed between 1835-42.

During the rule of Vazgen I Catholicos of Armenians, the church underwent basic renovations and improvements. Based on a plan drawn up by architect Rafayel Israyelian in 1972, the reconstruction works of the St Sarkis Church began and the character of the old building of the church was basically preserved. The face was covered with Ani orange tufa rocks and engraved with triangular niches. After Israyelian's death, the construction works were taken over and continued by the co-author, architect Ardzroun Galikian.

From 1971-76, the interior look of the church was significantly improved. On the eastern part of the church, a gallery was added for the church choir. As a result of such additions, it was found necessary to remove the old dome and the old drum and to replace them by a much higher dome with polyhedral fan-shaped spire. The construction of the bell tower of the St Sarkis Vicarial Church was completed in 2000.

The rebuilding process of Saint Sarkis Cathedral was realized through the donation of Armenian benefactors Sarkis Kurkjian and his sons, residing in London. A 2 kW photovoltaic power system was installed on the roof of the cathedral in 2009.

== Gallery ==
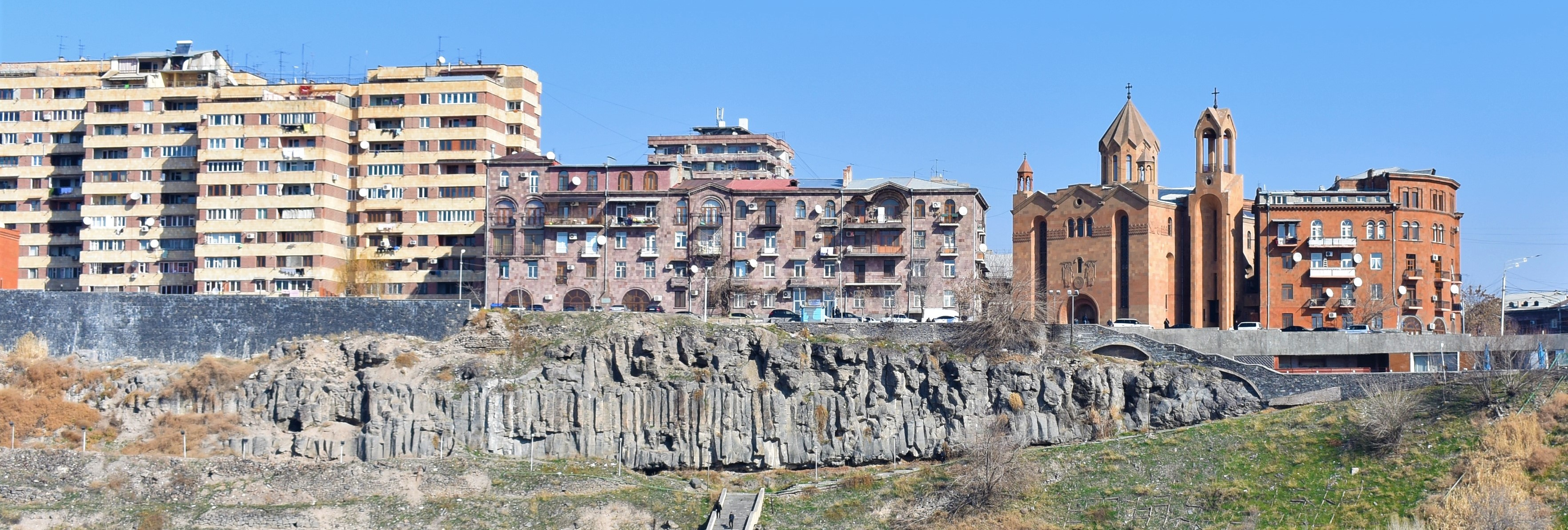

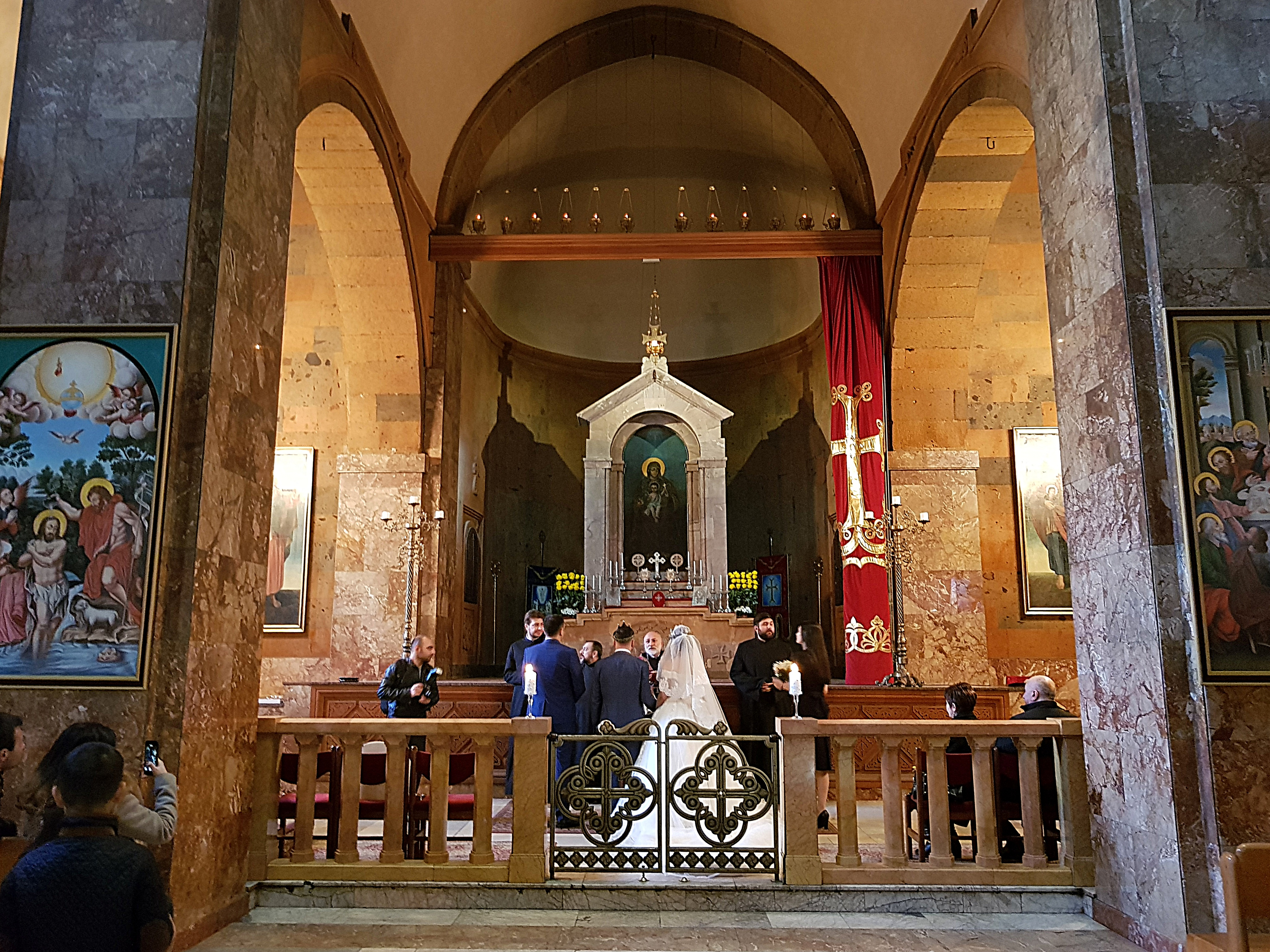

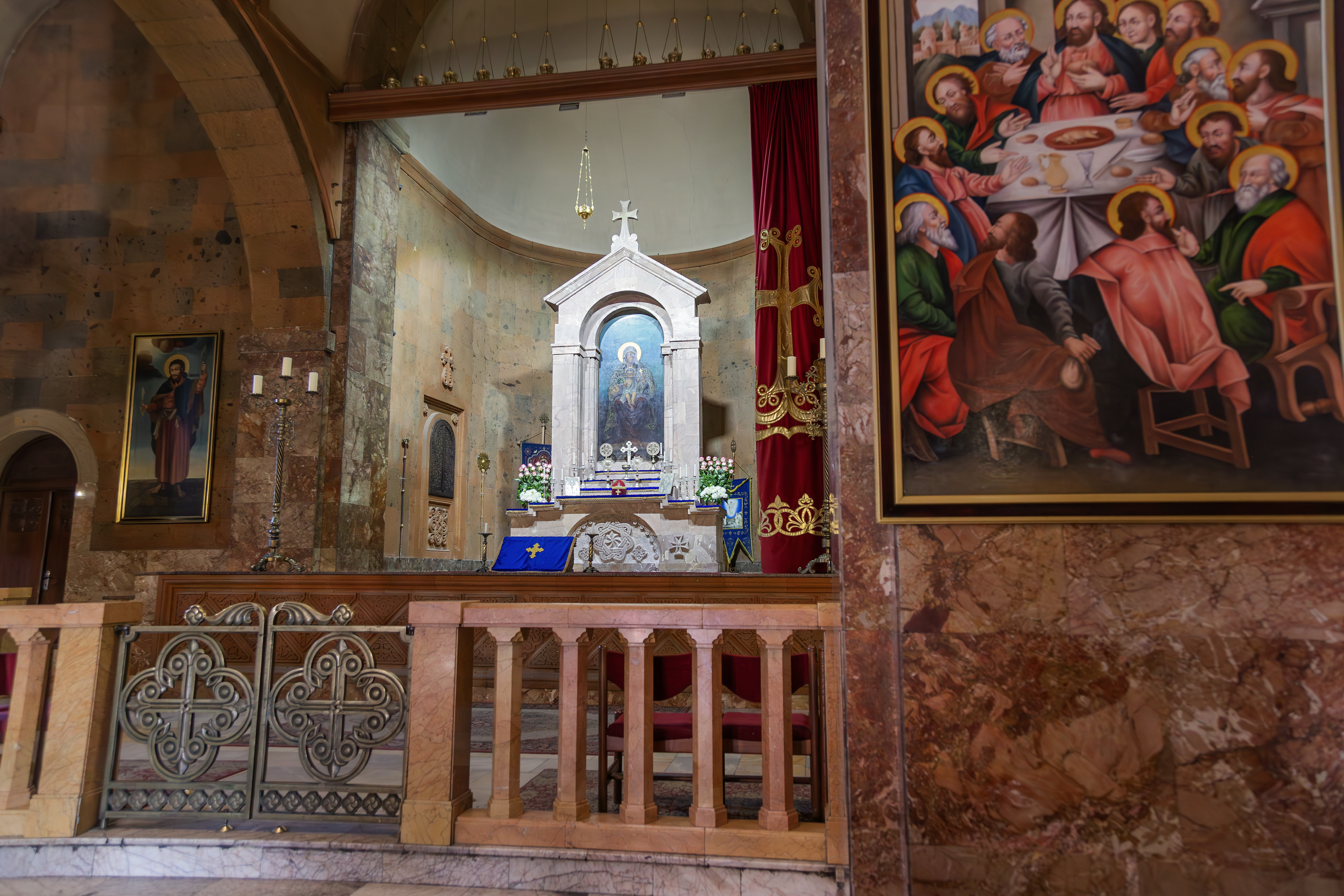

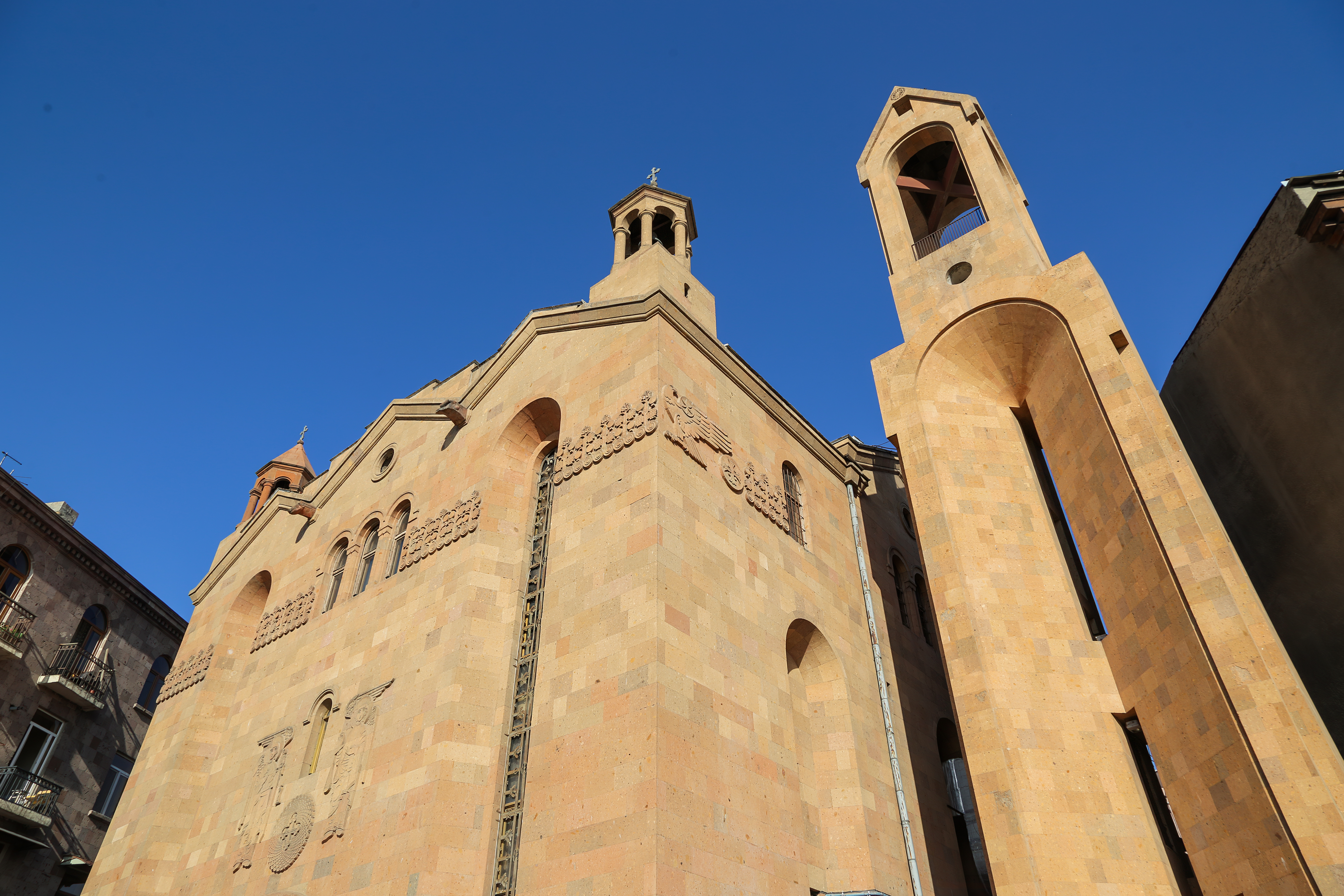

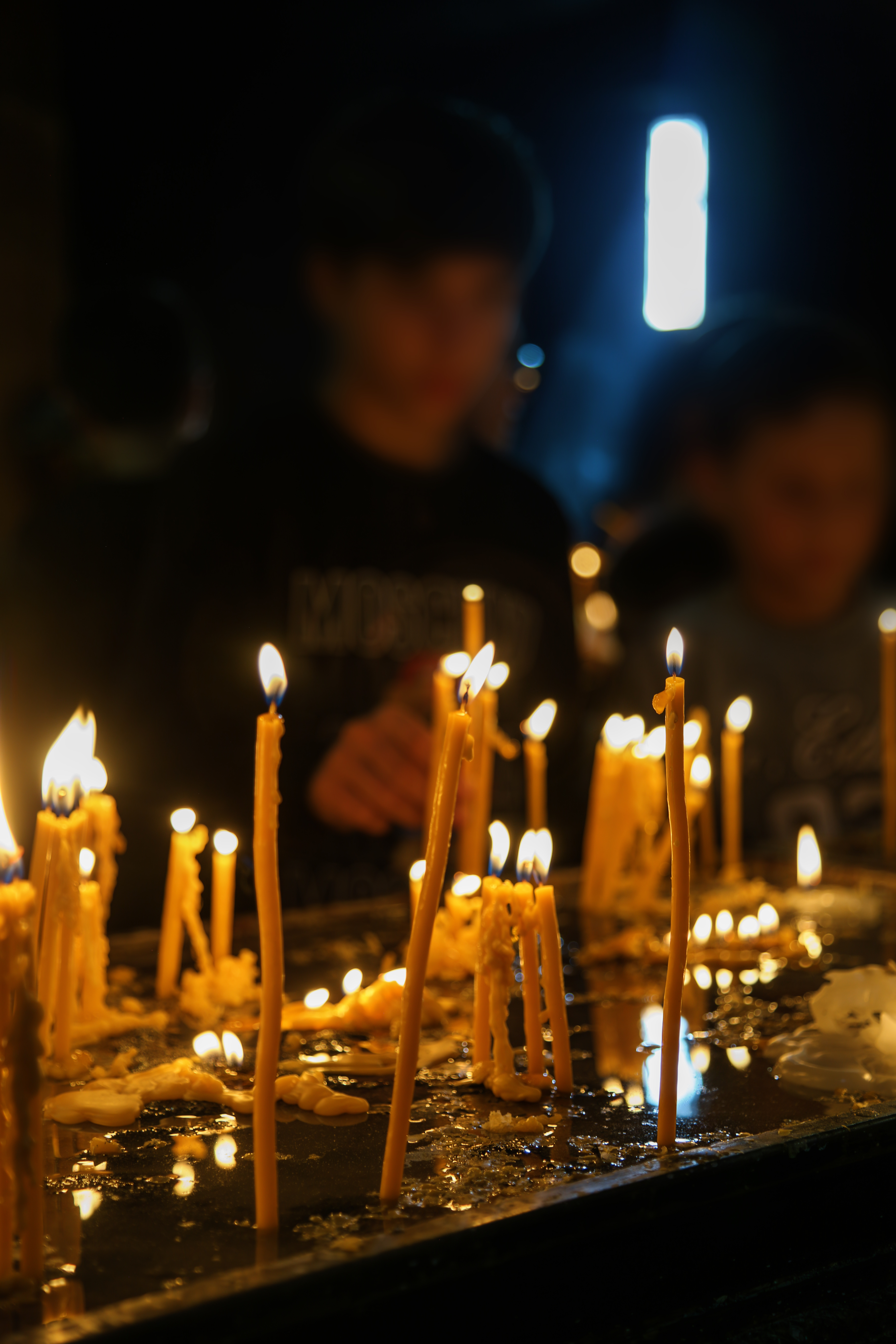
