= Verin Jrashen =

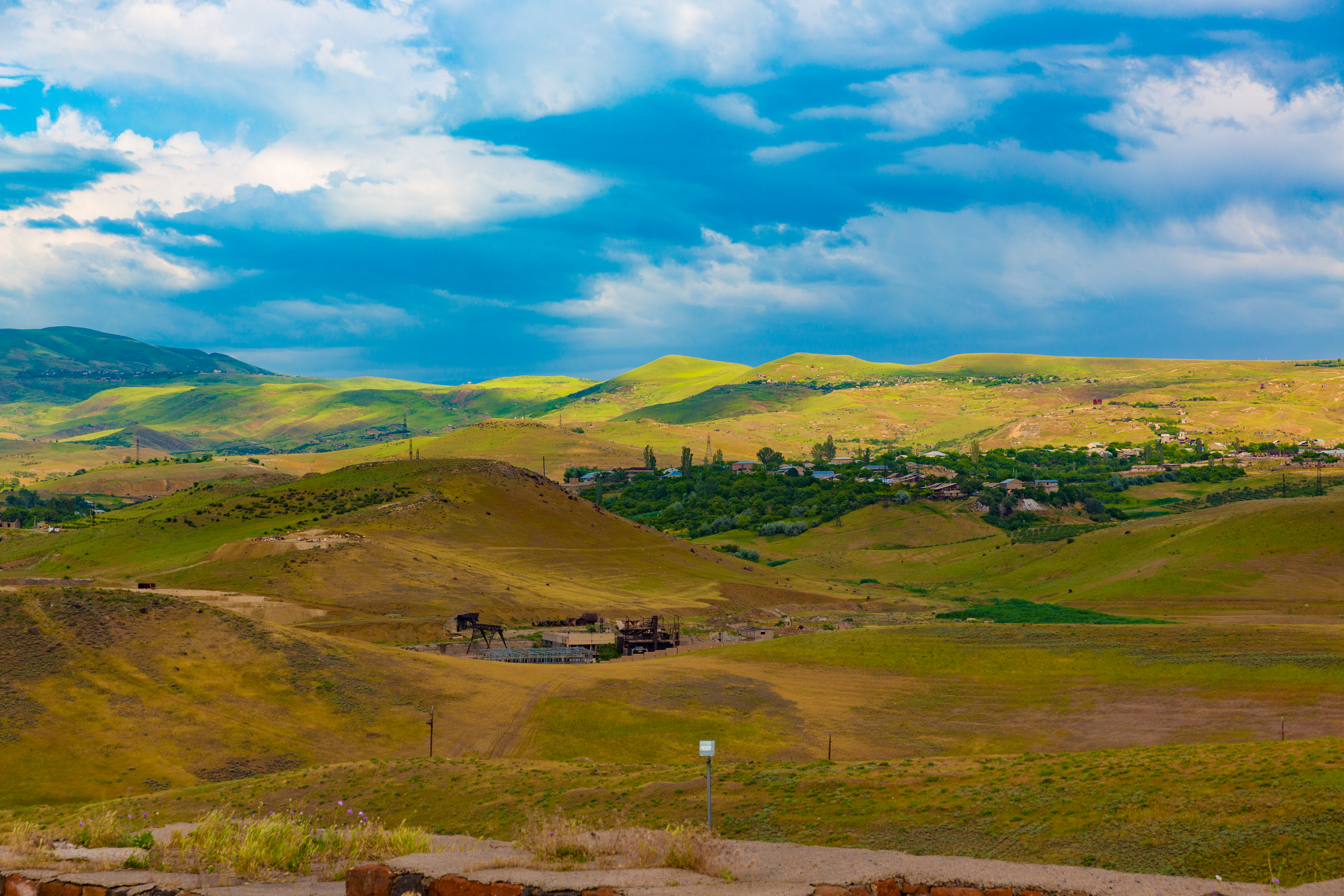
- Verin Jrashen at the east of Yerevan

- Location within Armenia
- Coordinates: 40°07′50″N 44°35′32″E
- Country: Armenia
- Marz (Province): Yerevan
- District: Erebuni
- Time zone: UTC+4 ( )

Verin Jrashen (Armenian: Վերին Ջրաշեն), is a neighbourhood in the Erebuni District of the Armenian capital Yerevan. It is very close by Argishti.
