= Jrashen, Lori =

Jrashen Ջրաշեն
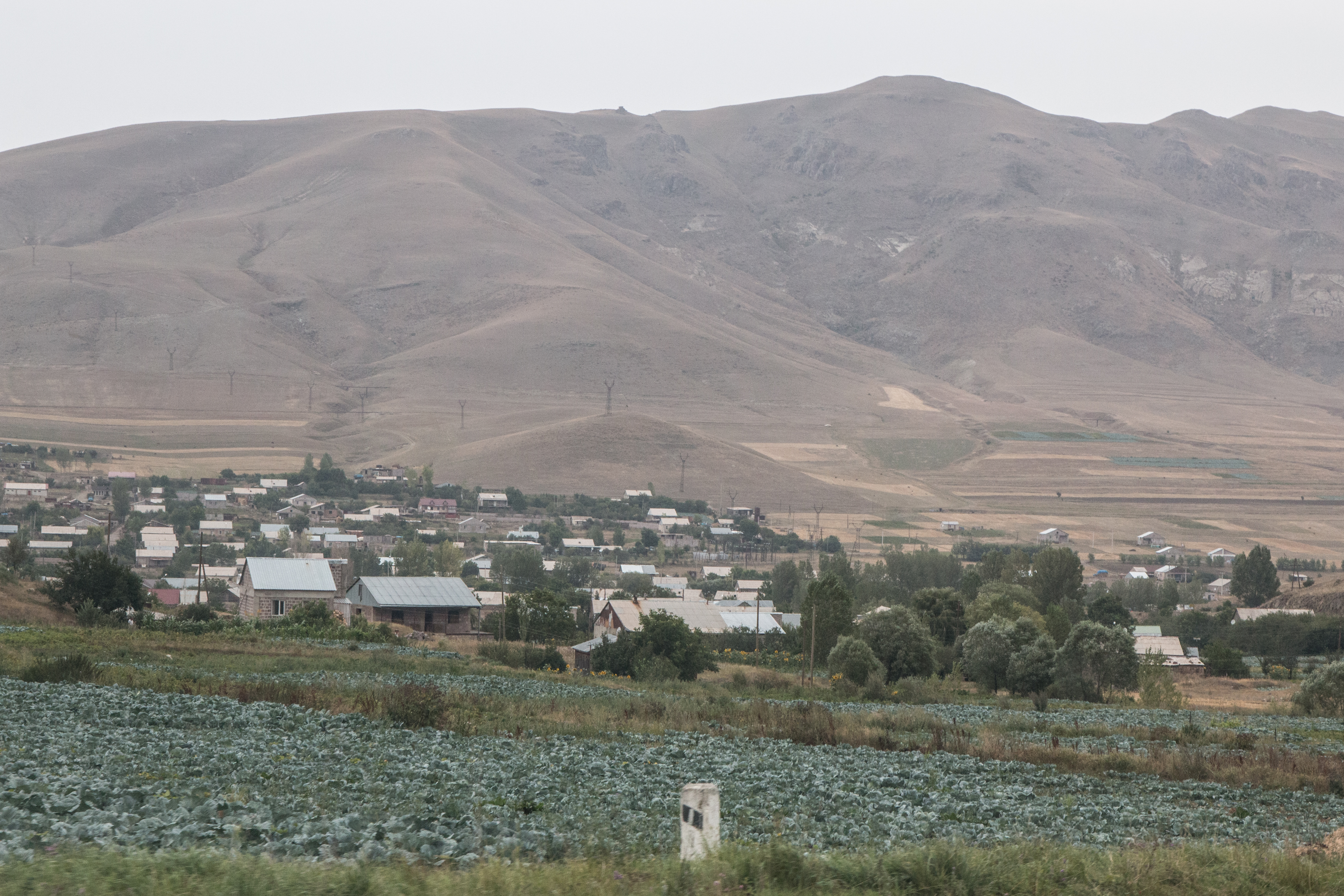
- Jrashen

- Location within Armenia
- Coordinates: 40°47′15″N 44°11′50″E
- Country: Armenia
- Province: Lori
- Elevation: 1,680 m (5,510 ft)

Population (2011)
  - Total: 3,096
- Time zone: UTC+4
  - Summer (DST): UTC+5

Jrashen (Armenian: Ջրաշեն), formerly known as Vardnav), is a major village in the Lori Province of Armenia.

During the 1988 Armenian earthquake, an elementary school in Jrashen collapsed, killing 400 people. The precast floors were not well-connected to the walls.
