= Lyon Park (Wisconsin) =

Park in Wisconsin Rapids, United States

Coordinates: 44°23′04″N 89°50′18″W

Lyon Park is an urban park located in and administered by the city of Wisconsin Rapids, Wisconsin.

The park has an area of 6.18 acres (2.50 ha). Lyon Park has the name of Clark Lyon, a local landowner. The riverfront park is adjacent to Ben Hansen Park.
