= Jrashen, Ararat =

Village in Ararat, Armenia

Jrashen Ջրաշեն
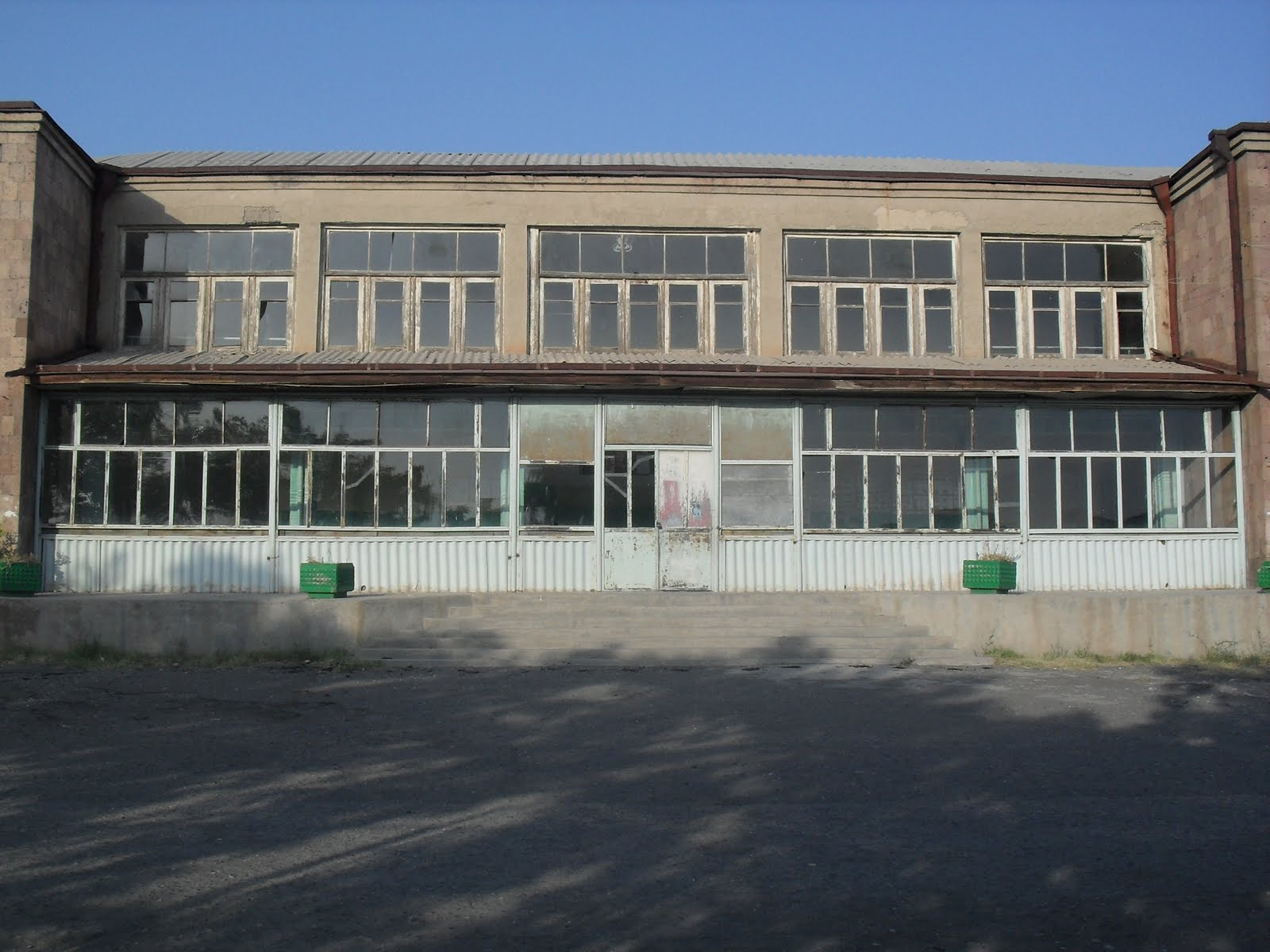
- Jrashen

- Location within Armenia Location within Ararat
- Coordinates: 40°03′17″N 44°30′48″E
- Country: Armenia
- Province: Ararat
- Municipality: Artashat
- Founded: 1928

Population (2011)
  - Total: 1,607
- Time zone: UTC+4
  - Summer (DST): UTC+5

Jrashen (Armenian: Ջրաշեն) is a village in the Artashat Municipality of the Ararat Province of Armenia.
