= Districts of Yerevan =

Administrative divisions of Yerevan

The Districts of Yerevan refers to administrative divisions of Yerevan, the capital of Armenia.

The twelve districts of Yerevan

Yerevan is divided into twelve "administrative districts" (վարչական շրջաններ), each with an elected community leader. Each district is divided into unofficial neighborhoods (թաղամասեր or թաղեր). The total area of the 12 districts of Yerevan is 223 square kilometres (86 square miles).

District	Armenian	Population (2011 census)	Population (2016 estimate)	Population (2022 census)	Area (km²)
Ajapnyak	Աջափնյակ	108,282	109,100	111,508	25.82
Arabkir	Արաբկիր	117,704	115,800	118,870	13.29
Avan	Ավան	53,231	53,100	55,094	7.26
Davtashen	Դավթաշեն	42,380	42,500	43,704	6.47
Erebuni	Էրեբունի	123,092	126,500	124,957	47.49
Kanaker-Zeytun	Քանաքեռ-Զեյթուն	73,886	74,100	73,834	7.73
Kentron	Կենտրոն	125,453	125,700	119,841	13.35
Malatia-Sebastia	Մալաթիա-Սեբաստիա	132,900	135,900	140,784	25.16
Nork-Marash	Նորք-Մարաշ	12,049	11,800	11,098	4.76
Nor Nork	Նոր Նորք	126,065	130,300	134,668	14.11
Nubarashen	Նուբարաշեն	9,561	9,800	11,794	17.24
Shengavit	Շենգավիթ	135,535	139,100	140,525	40.6

== Persian and Russian eras ==
=== Main districts ===
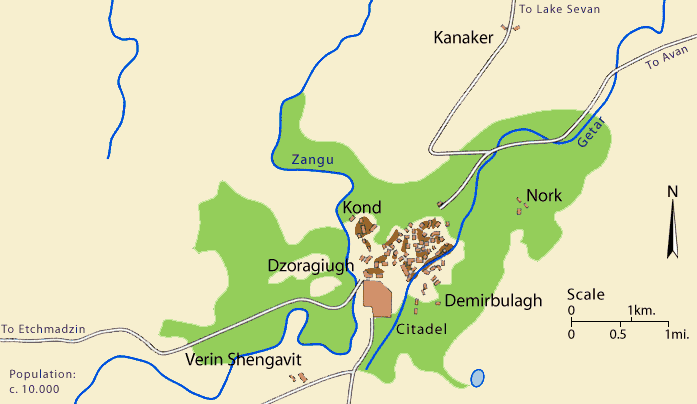
Yerevan in the 18th century.

Since the 17th century, without the fortress and nearby villages (Noragyugh, Dzoragyugh and Nork), Yerevan was divided into three main quarters (mahlas; Persian: محله):

1. Shahar (The Old City),
2. Demir-Bulagh (Karahank)
3. Kond (Tapabash).

The market (Ghantar) was separate, between Kond and Shahar.

Ethnic composition of Yerevan, 1830
Quarter	Armenians			Tatars	Bosha	Total
Quarter	Indigenous	Persian	Ottoman	Tatars	Bosha	Total
Shahar	998	1,111	30	3,199		5,338
Kond	1,176	374	18	2,537	195	4,300
Demirbulagh		230		1,595		1,825
YEREVAN	2,174	1,715	48	7,331	195	11,463
YEREVAN	3,937			7,331	195	11,463

==== Shahar ====
Shahar (Persian: شهر šahar) was the oldest and biggest quarter of Yerevan. It located in the north-eastern part of the city, between Amiryan St. and Khorenatsi St. It was, probably, populated since the Urartian times. During later centuries it was destroyed many times, but have always been populated. First time it was mentioned as old Yerevan or the old city of Yerevan by bishop Pilipos of Bjni in 1631:

…after many searches I found it [the Bible] in the old city of Yerevan…
Բազում որոնմամբ խուզեալ գտաք, զգանձս զայս անգին ի հին քաղաքն Երեւան բազում ժամանակաւ գերի տարեալ ումեք իբրեւ եօթանասնօք

==== Kond ====
Kond (Armenian: Կոնդ), so-named because of its high position. It was also known as Tapabashi (Turkish: tepe - hill, baş - head, top; "top of the hill") during the Persian rule. Kond located in the western part of Yerevan. According to Hovhannes Shahkhatunyants, an Armenian historian, Kond located in the western and southern hillsides and foot of a rocky hill with similar name. Its western border was Hrazdan River, and the northern border was the Kozern Cemetery. Kond, similar to Shahar, was populated by Armenians. The population of Kond became multiethnic, when about 100 Armenian Boshas moved to Kond.

==== Demir-Bulagh ====
The third main quarter was Demir-Bulagh (Turkish: "demir" - iron, "bulağ" - source, meaning "iron source"') or Karahank (Armenian: Քարահանք, meaning "rock quarry" referring to a quarry of tufa and basalt there). It located in the south-eastern Yerevan. This district was inhabited, comparatively, later than other districts. Firstly, a quarry located here and was not inhabited. Later, Karahank was inhabited with newcomer Tatars (Azerbaijanis) and became part of Yerevan forming a separate district. Demir-Bulagh become crowded in the 17th century, when terrified of the Persian invasions, many Turks from Nakhichevan moved to the areas north to the Yerevan Fortress. The majority of the population of the district were Muslims, few Armenians lived there.

==== Ghantar (the market) ====
Ghantar (Armenian: Ղանթար, meaning "big scales in a marketplace", from Arabic: قنطار, qinṭār) was the active and business center of Yerevan. Ghantar belonged to the City Administration. Later, in place of Ghantar was built a close market and was called Ghantar. In 1938, the Children's Park (called Kirov Park during the Soviet era) was built in the place of Ghantar.

=== Expansion in the mid-19th century ===
Yerevan city plan created by an Armenian architect Boris Mehrabyan in 1906-1911

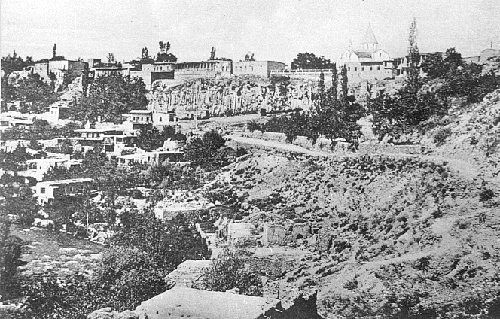
Dzoragyugh in the early 20th century. Surb Sargis Church can be seen at the top right corner.

After Erivan was taken over by the Russian troops in 1827, many Armenians from northern Persia came to Eastern Armenia, including to Yerevan. The city was expanded. In the mid-19th century Yerevan had 6 districts:

1. Shahar
2. Kond
3. Demir-Bulagh
4. Dzoragyugh
5. Nor tagh
6. Shen tagh
7. Nork

Yerevan has been expanded at the expense of two surrounding villages: Dzoragyugh and Nork.

==== Dzoragyugh ====
Dzoragyugh (Armenian: Ձորագյուղ, Dara-kend in Turkish and Azerbaijani) was a suburb and later a district of Yerevan. It located in the Hrazdan gorge, in the left steep coast. During the Persian rule it was officially translated as Dara-kend. According to Zakaria Sarkavag this village - which before becoming a district of Yerevan was a separate village - was called Khnkelo dzor. According to Simeon I of Yerevan this village was called with two names: Dzoragyugh and Khnkadzor. The Surb Sargis Church located in Dzoragygh and commonly was called the Church of Dzoragyugh. Dzoragyugh was called Khnkadzor or Khnkelo, because it was Yerevan's bishop's seat, the word "khunk" means 'incense' in Armenian. The population of Dzoragyugh was completely Armenian. Dzoragyugh had three smaller neighborhoods:

- Verin tagh (Վերին թաղ, "Upper district") or Karapi tagh (Քարափի թաղ, "The Bluff district") located on the left upland of Hrazdan, north-west from the fortress, in the surrounding area of the St. Sargis church.
- Storin tagh (Ստորին թաղ, "Lower district") or Dzori tagh (Ձորի թաղ, "The Gorge district") located on the left side of Hrazdan, in a precipitous gorge.
- The district of Karbi (Կարբիի թաղ) was, probably, the southern continuation of Storin tagh. Many people from Karbi village of Ashtarak lived there.

==== Nork ====
Nork (Armenian: Նորք, Turkish: Çömlekçi, meaning "potter") was the second villages near Yerevan, that became its part in the 1830s. Because the pottery was common labor, the Turks called it Cholmakci (Çömlekçi). The population was completely Armenian. They were working in agriculture, vegetable-growing, farming, and pottery. There were smaller districts (mahlans) in Nork, too. Though Nork was inhabited since ancient times, but it was mentioned comparatively late. There were two churches in Nork: Surb Astvatsatsin and Surb Simeon Tseruni (19th century).

And other two new districts were built: Nor tagh and Shen tagh.

==== Nor tagh ====
Nor tagh (Armenian: Նոր թաղ, meaning “new district”) located in the eastern part of Kond, in the surrounding are of the Hovhannes Tumanyan House-Museum. It was called ‘new’, because many immigrants from Atropatene were moved here after the 1828 Treaty of Turkmenchay. During the Persian rule, in the place of the Nor tagh were the Gardens of the Sardars, called Khanlubagh (Persian: باغ خان)

==== Shen tagh ====
Shen tagh (Armenian: Շեն թաղ) located in the surrounding areas of the English Park.

== Soviet era ==
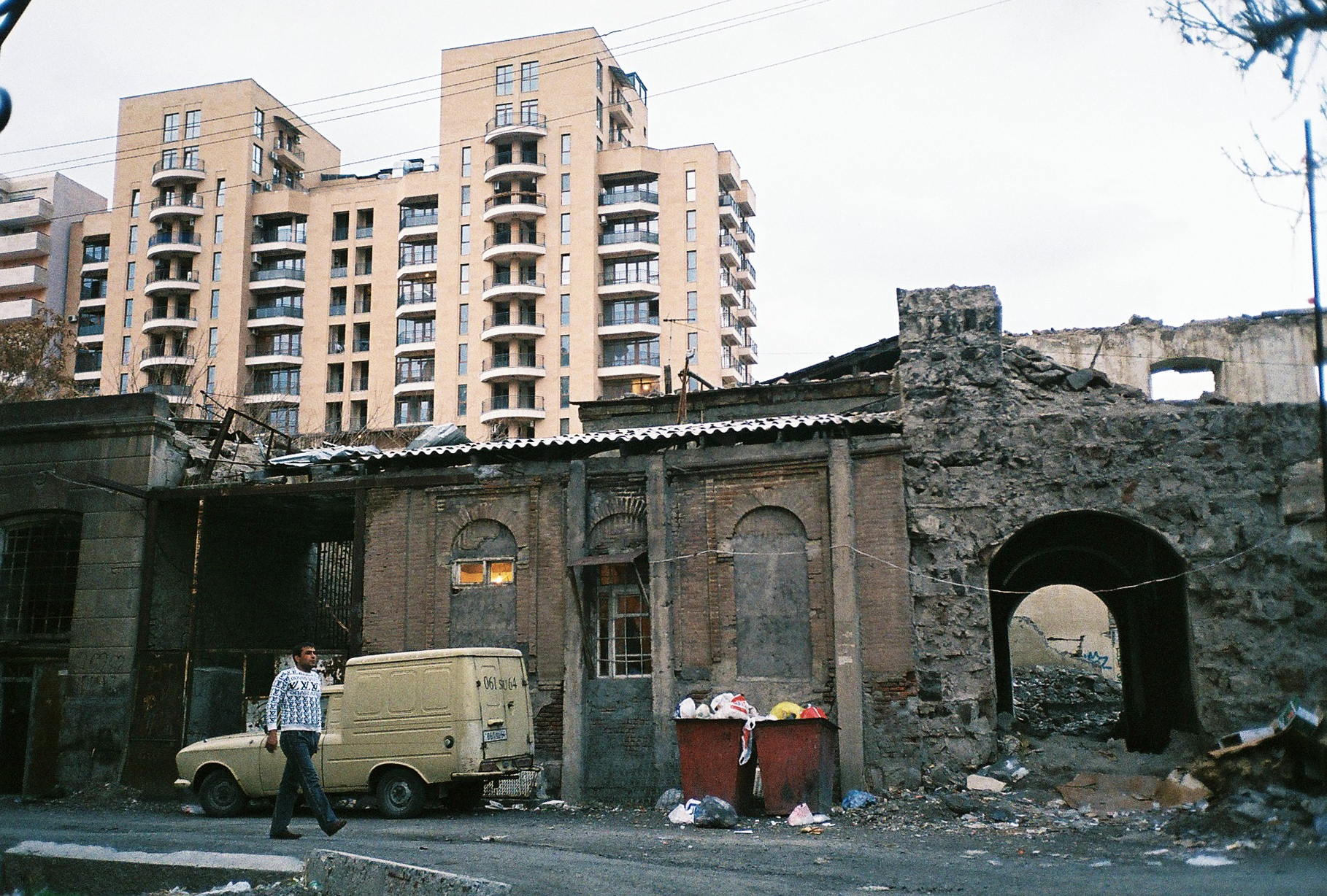
Historical districts in Yerevan being demolished and replaced with modern buildings

Note: for the names of raions the Russian names are given, which was official at the time.

The first administrative division of Yerevan took place in 1936. Two raions were formed:

- Kirov raion (Кировский район)
- Stalin raion (Сталинский район)

The Spandaryan raion (Спандарянский район) was formed in 1938 and the Molotov raion (Молотовский район) in 1939. As of 1940, Yerevan had 4 raions:

- Kirov raion (Кировский район)
- Molotov raion (Молотовский район)
- Spandaryan raion (Спандарянский район)
- Stalin raion (Сталинский район)

The Kirov raion was disintegrated in 1953. In 1957, the Molotov raion was renamed as Lenin raion. In 1958, Shahumyan raion was formed, followed by the Ordzhonikidze raion in 1961. So as of 1971, there were 6 raions in Yerevan:

- 26 Commissars raion (Район им.26 Комиссаров)
- Lenin raion (Ленинский район)
- Myasnikyan raion (Мясникянский район)
- Shahumyan raion (Шаумянский район)
- Spandaryan raion (Спандарянский район)
- Ordzhonikidze raion (Орджоникидзевский район)

The Soviet raion (Советский район) was formed in 1972, followed by the Mashtots raion (Маштоцкий район) in 1986.

Raions of Yerevan and their populations according to the last Soviet census of 1989:

Raion	Russian	Armenian	Population
Soviet raion	Советский район	Սովետական շրջան	279,494
Shahumyan raion	Шаумянский район	Շահումյանի շրջան	192,899
26 Commissars raion	Район имени 26 комиссаров	26 կոմիսարների շրջան	186,754
Lenin raion	Ленинский район	Լենինի շրջան	138,926
Ordzhonikidze raion	Орджоникидзевский район	Օրջոնիկիձեի շրջան	133,038
Mashtots raion	Маштоцкий район	Մաշտոցի շրջան	125,620
Spandaryan raion	Спандарянский район	Սպանդարյան շրջան	80,580
Myasnikyan raion	Мясникянский район	Մյասնիկյանի շրջան	64,228
City of Yerevan	город Ереван	քաղաք Երևան	1,201,539

== See also ==
- History of Yerevan
- Yerevan
- Erebuni Fortress
- Armenian Oblast
- Erivan Governorate
- Khanate of Erevan
- History of Armenia
