= List of Yerevan Metro stations =

The following is a list of all stations of the Yerevan Metro:

== Name changes ==
Some stations have changed names over the years.

Station	Previous name(s)	Years
Marshal Baghramyan	Saralandzhi	1981–1982
Republic Square	Lenin Square	1981–1992
Garegin Nzhdeh Square	Spandaryan Square	1987–1992
General Andranik	Hoktemberyan	1989–1990

== Stations ==
Station (English translation/transcription)	Station (Armenian)	Photo	Line	Opened
Barekamutyun	Բարեկամություն	Barekamutyun (Yerevan Metro)	ErevanMetroLigne1	7 March 1981
Marshal Baghramyan	Մարշալ Բաղրամյան	Marshal Baghramyan Metro Station	ErevanMetroLigne1	7 March 1981
Yeritasardakan	Երիտասարդական	Youth Station 11	ErevanMetroLigne1	8 March 1981
Republic Square	Հանրապետության Հրապարակ	Metro Yerevan Republic Square metro station	ErevanMetroLigne1	26 December 1981
Zoravar (General) Andranik	Զորավար Անդրանիկ	Metro Yerevan Zoravar Andranik metro station	ErevanMetroLigne1	26 December 1989
David of Sasun	Սասունցի Դավիթ	David of Sasun Metro Station 11 (4)	ErevanMetroLigne1	7 March 1981
Gortsaranain	Գործարանային	Gortsaranain0833	ErevanMetroLigne1	11 June 1983
Shengavit	Շենգավիթ	Shengavit underground station0581	ErevanMetroLigne1	26 December 1985
Garegin Nzhdeh Square	Գարեգին Նժդեհի Հրապարակ	Garegin Nzhdeh Square (Yerevan Metro)	ErevanMetroLigne1	4 January 1987
Charbakh	Չարբախ	Charbakh metro 2	ErevanMetroLigne1	26 December 1996

== See also ==
- Transport in Armenia
- Yerevan Metro
- Yerevan
