= Republic Square (Yerevan Metro) =

Yerevan Metro Station

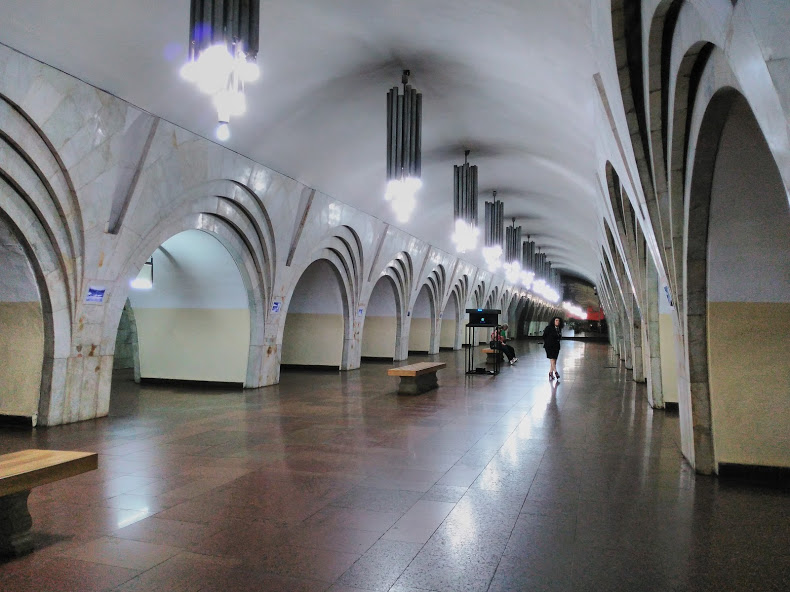

General information
- Coordinates: 40.1043°N 44.3057°E
- System: Yerevan Metro station
- Operator: Yerevan Metro
- Platforms: 1
- Tracks: 2

History
- Opened: 26 December 1981
- Former names: Lenin Square

Services
Preceding station	Yerevan Metro	Following station
Yeritasardakan towards Barekamutyun	Karen Demirchyan Yerevan Subway	General Andranik towards Charbakh or Garegin Nzhdeh Square
Location

Republic Square (Armenian: Հանրապետության Հրապարակ) is a Yerevan Metro station, opened on 26 December 1981. The station is located in the Kentron District and exits at Nalbandyan and Aram Streets and Main Avenue. Nearby are Republic Square, the first and third buildings of the Government of Armenia, handicraft fair Vernissage, and the National History Museum of Armenia.

The station is named after Republic Square. Until 1992, it was called Lenin Square.

== Station design ==
The station is characterized by a unique design, unparalleled in Soviet or international metro construction. The main architectural element is the pylons, noticeably tapered in width and of considerable depth. This configuration creates the illusion of an arched column, especially when viewed from the central part of the station. However, unlike traditional column-based stations, the design is based on a pylon layout, where the visual effect of arching is achieved through the specific geometry of the supporting elements.

The station was designed by architects Jim Torosyan and Mkrtich Minasyan. Their project was awarded the State Prize of the Armenian SSR in 1983. The main constructor of the station is Henzel Hakobyan, the project was constructed by Arbak Hovhannisyan.

== Gallery ==
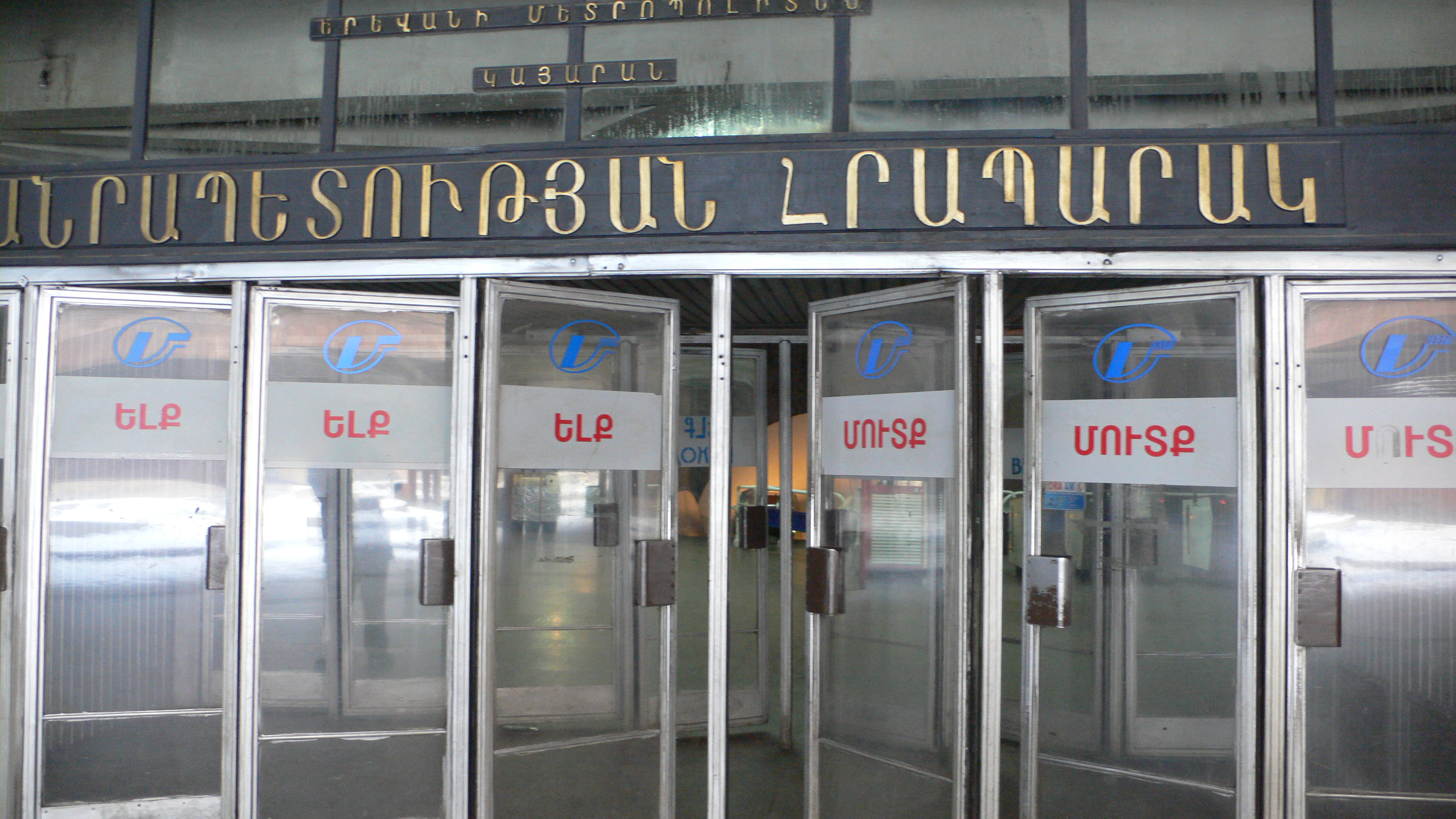
Main entrance of the station

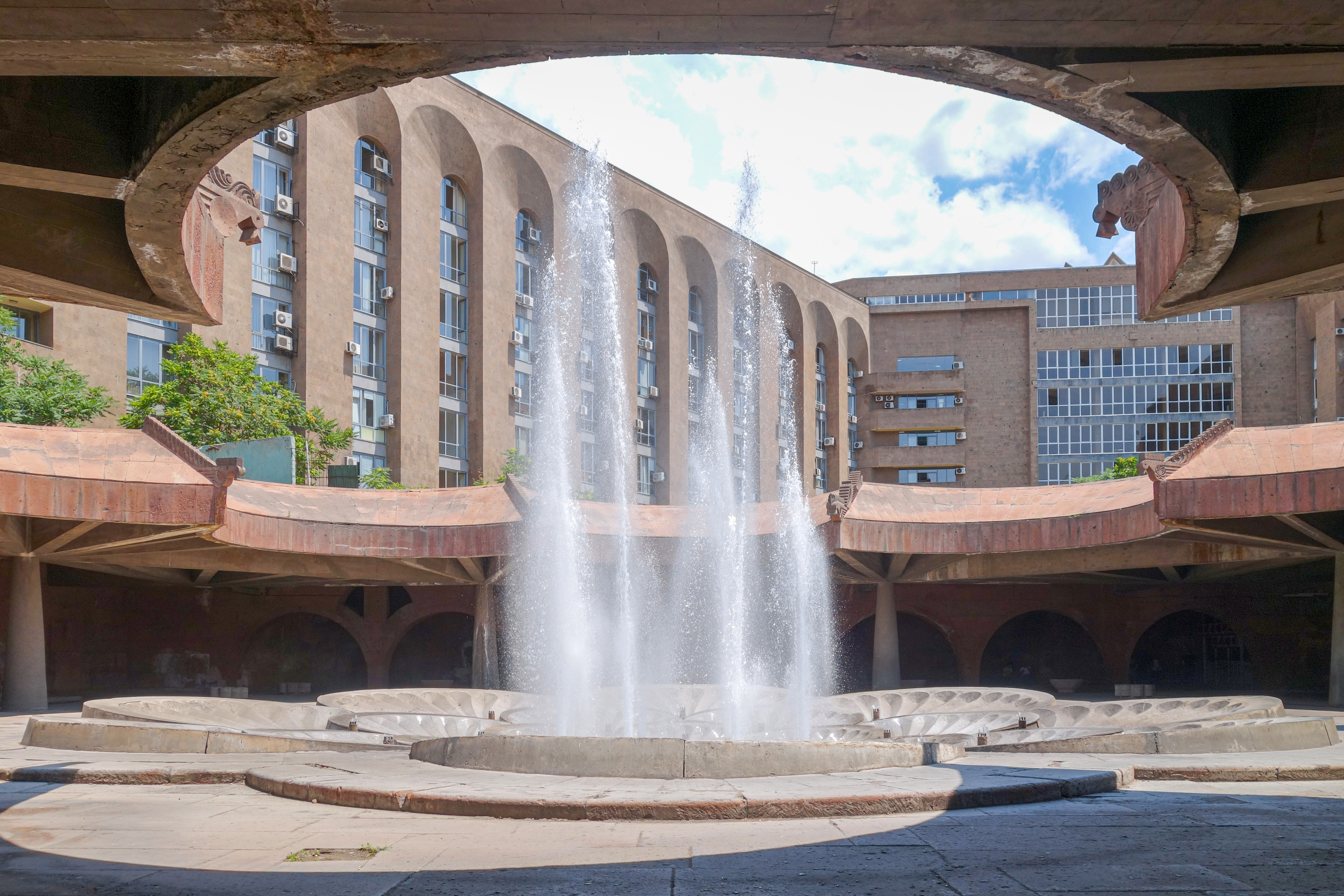
Fountains of the station

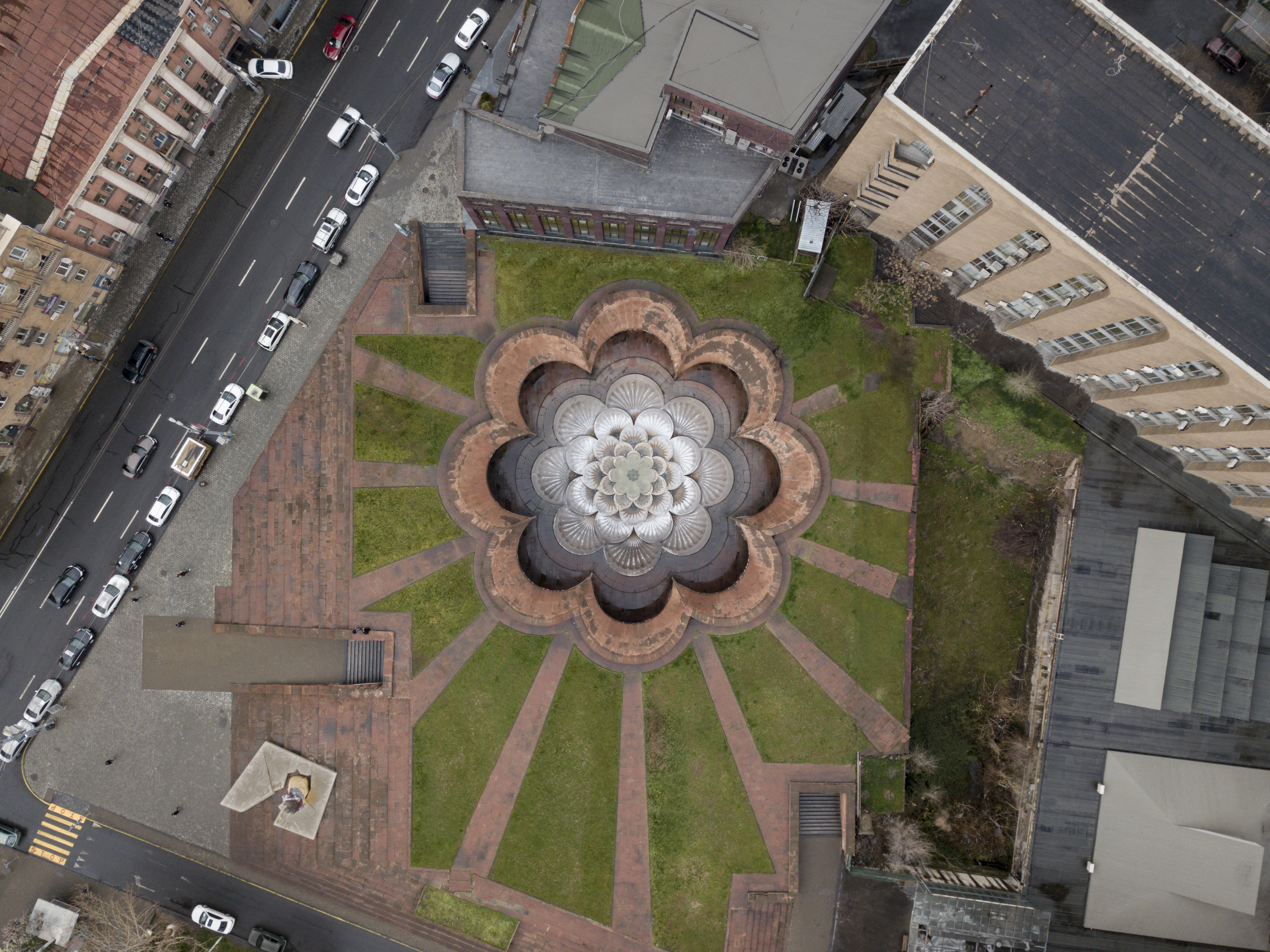
Station's view from the air
