= David of Sasun (Yerevan Metro) =

Yerevan Metro Station

Coordinates: 40.1552°N 44.5072°E

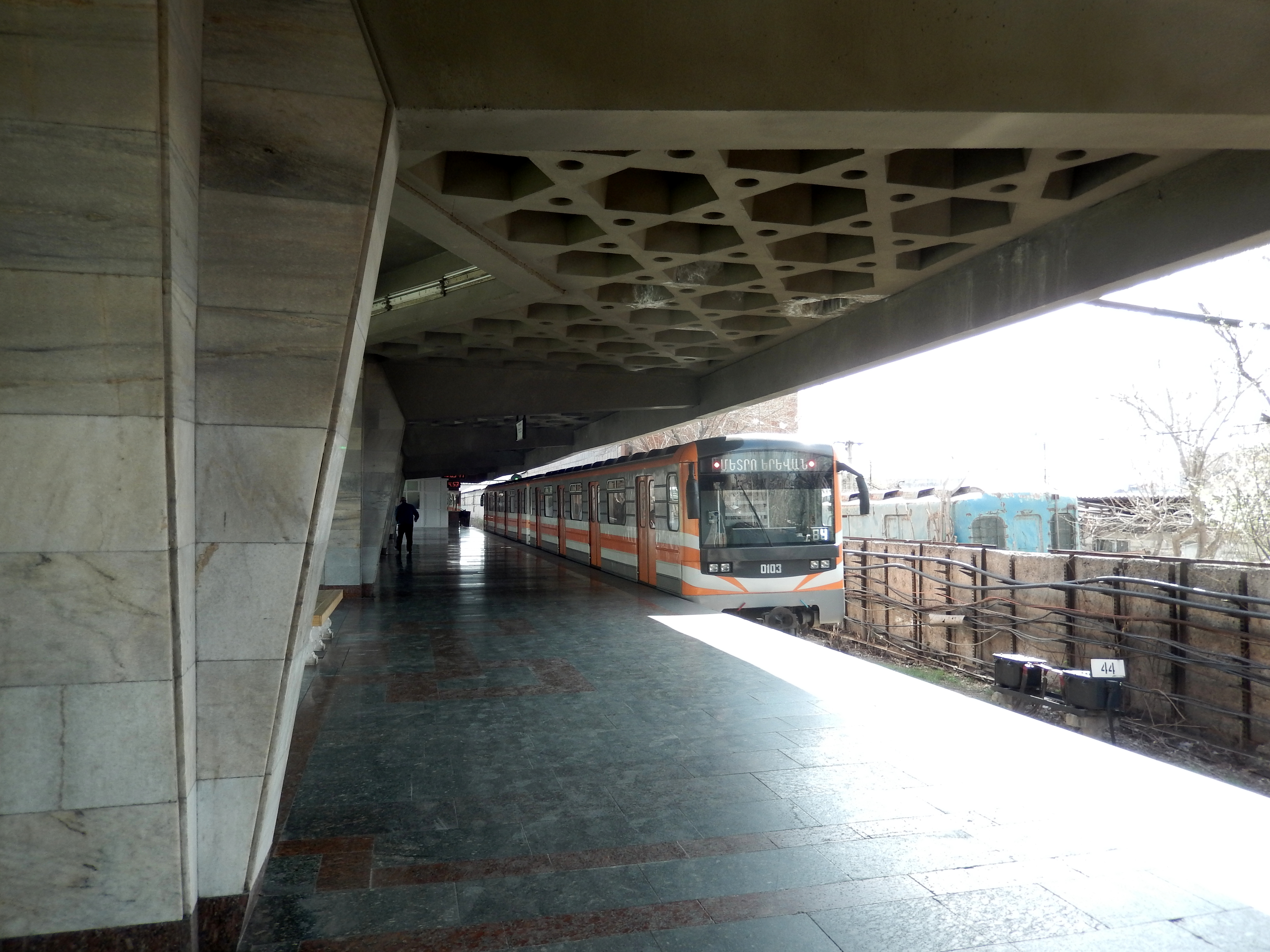
- The main platform

General information
- System: Yerevan Metro station
- Operator: Yerevan Metro
- Platforms: 1
- Tracks: 2
- Connections: Yerevan railway station

Construction
- Structure type: Above ground

History
- Opened: 7 March 1981

Services
Preceding station	Yerevan Metro	Following station
General Andranik towards Barekamutyun	Karen Demirchyan Yerevan Subway	Gortsaranayin towards Charbakh or Garegin Nzhdeh Square
Location

David of Sasun (Armenian: Սասունցի Դավիթ) is a Yerevan Metro station, opened on 7 March 1981. The station is located in the center of Yerevan, in the Shengavit District, with exits to David of Sasun Square with the statue to David of Sasun, Yerevan railway station, Tigran the Great and Artsakh Avenues, and Sevan Street.

The station was named after David of Sasun, the main hero of the Armenian national epic "Daredevils of Sassoun", who drove the Arab invaders out of Armenia.

== Station design ==
The station is above ground, with a single island platform measuring 102 meters in length and 10 meters in width. The architectural design was developed by architects Baghdasar Arzumanyan, Sergey Nersisyan, and Rafael Israelyan. The structural designer is Gerasim Gevorgyan.

The station is designed in a modernist style with elements of national Armenian architecture. The underground vestibule is decorated with bas-reliefs by sculptor Artashes Hovsepyan. The bas-reliefs depict scenes from the epic poem "Daredevils of Sassoun," including images of David of Sasun, Little Mher, Kurkik Jalali, and other characters.

== Gallery ==
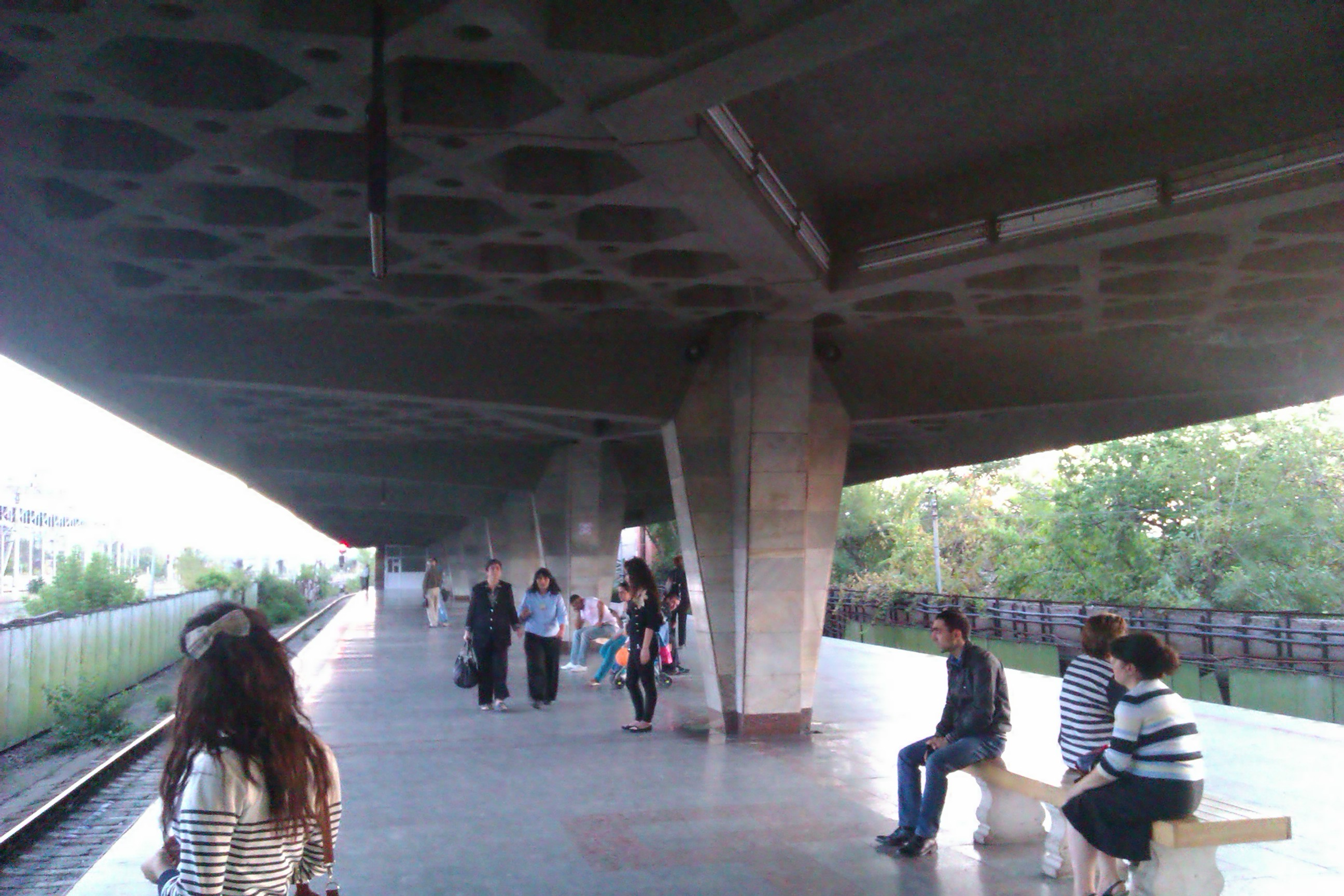
Inside the station

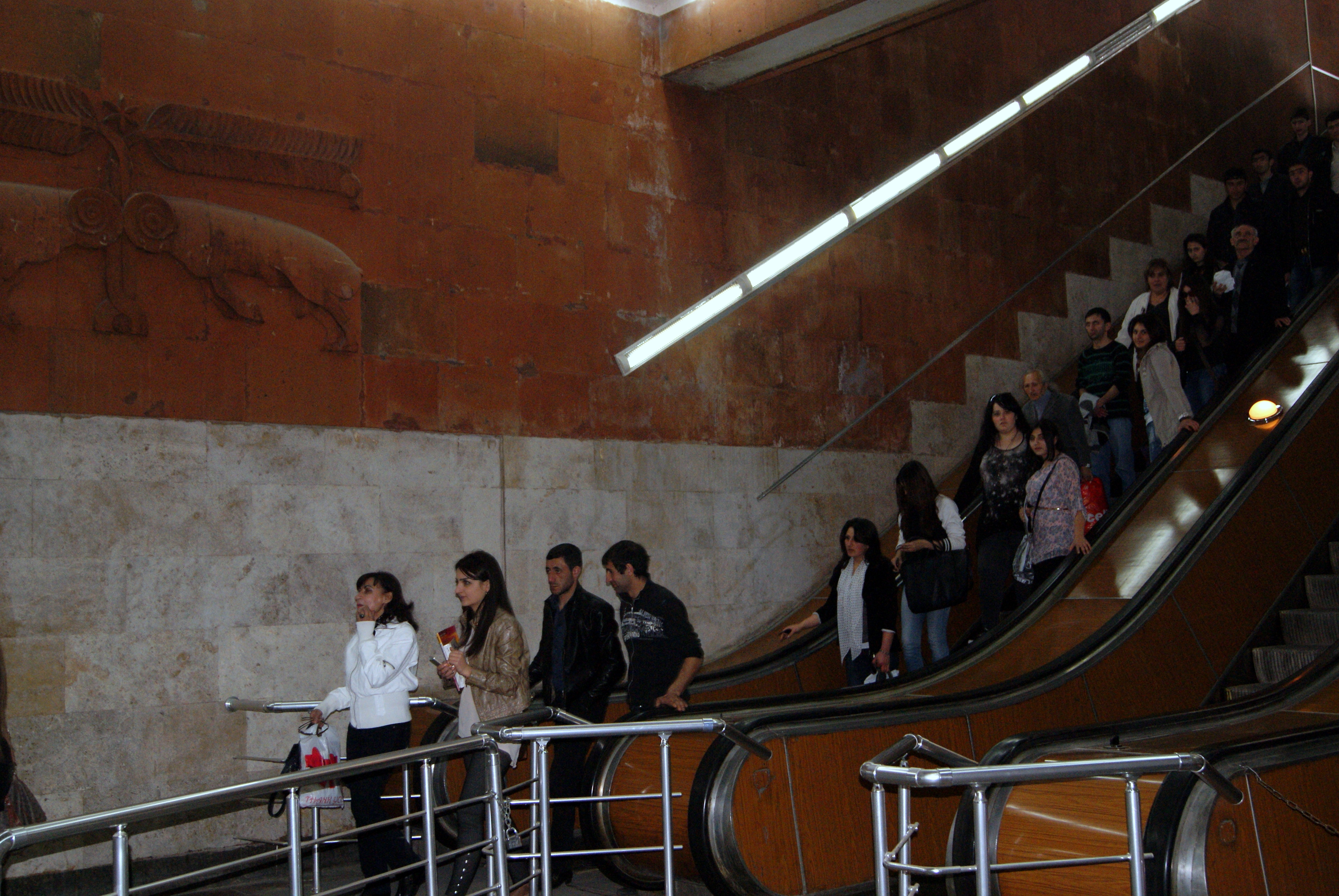

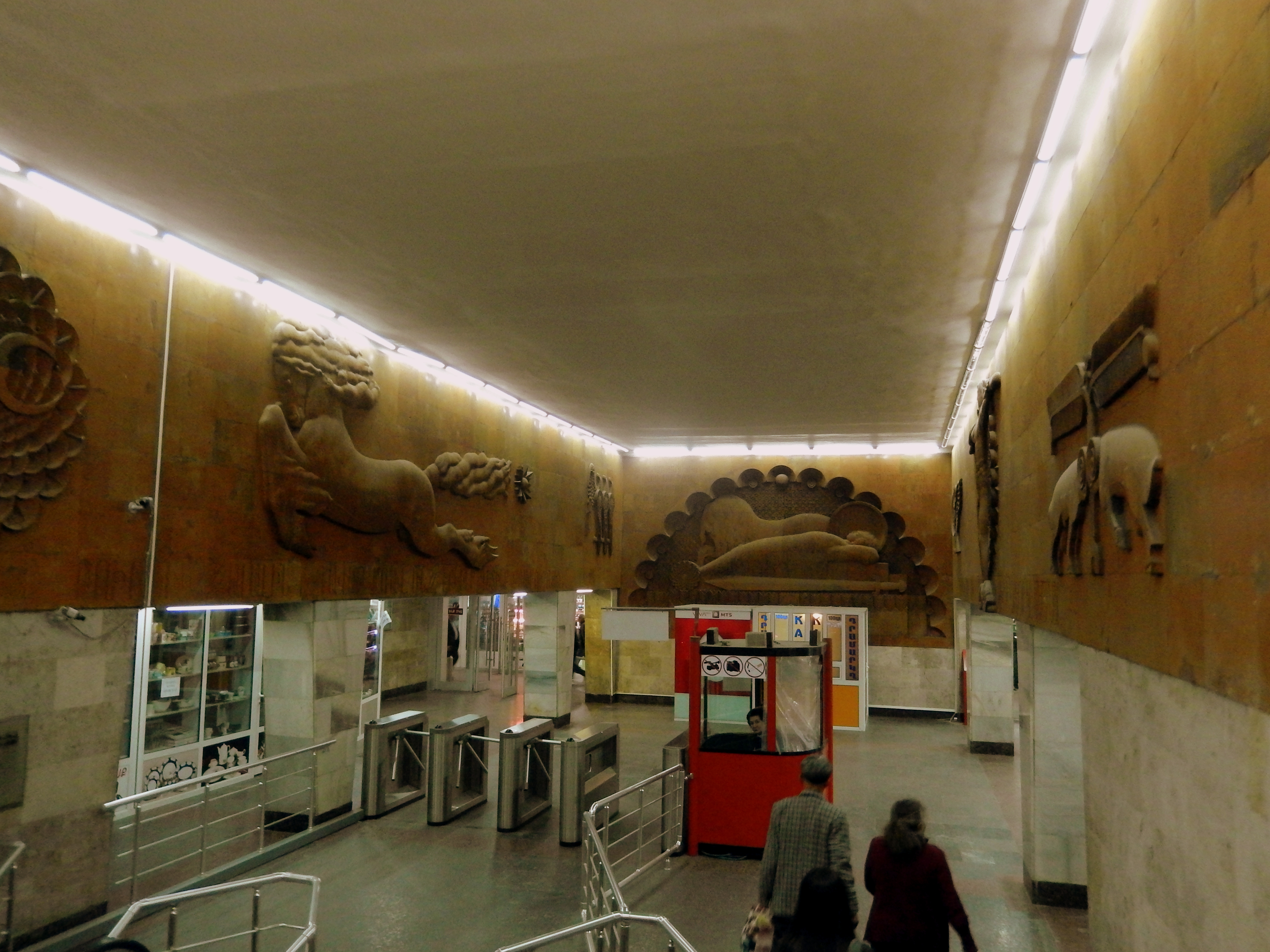

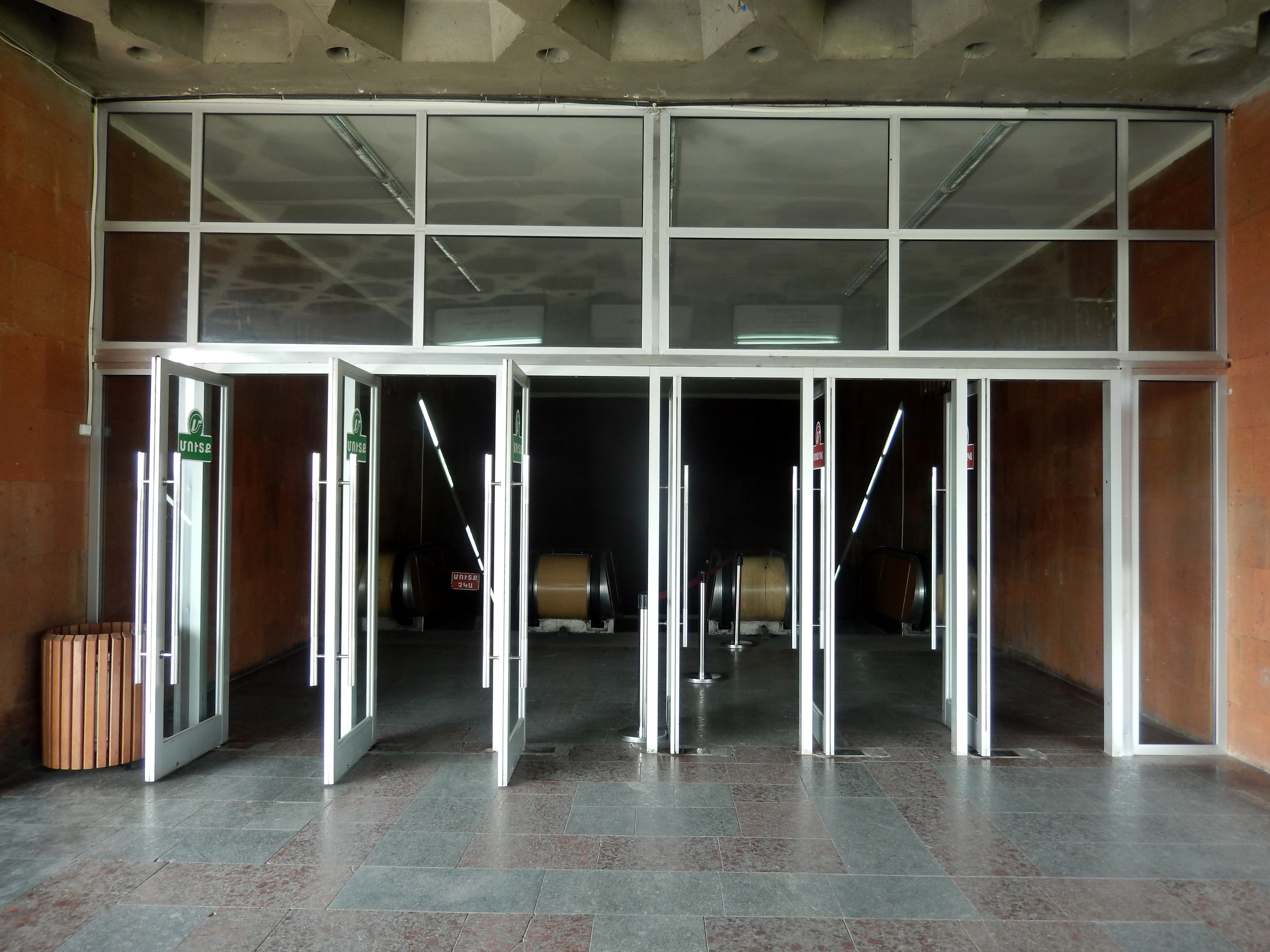

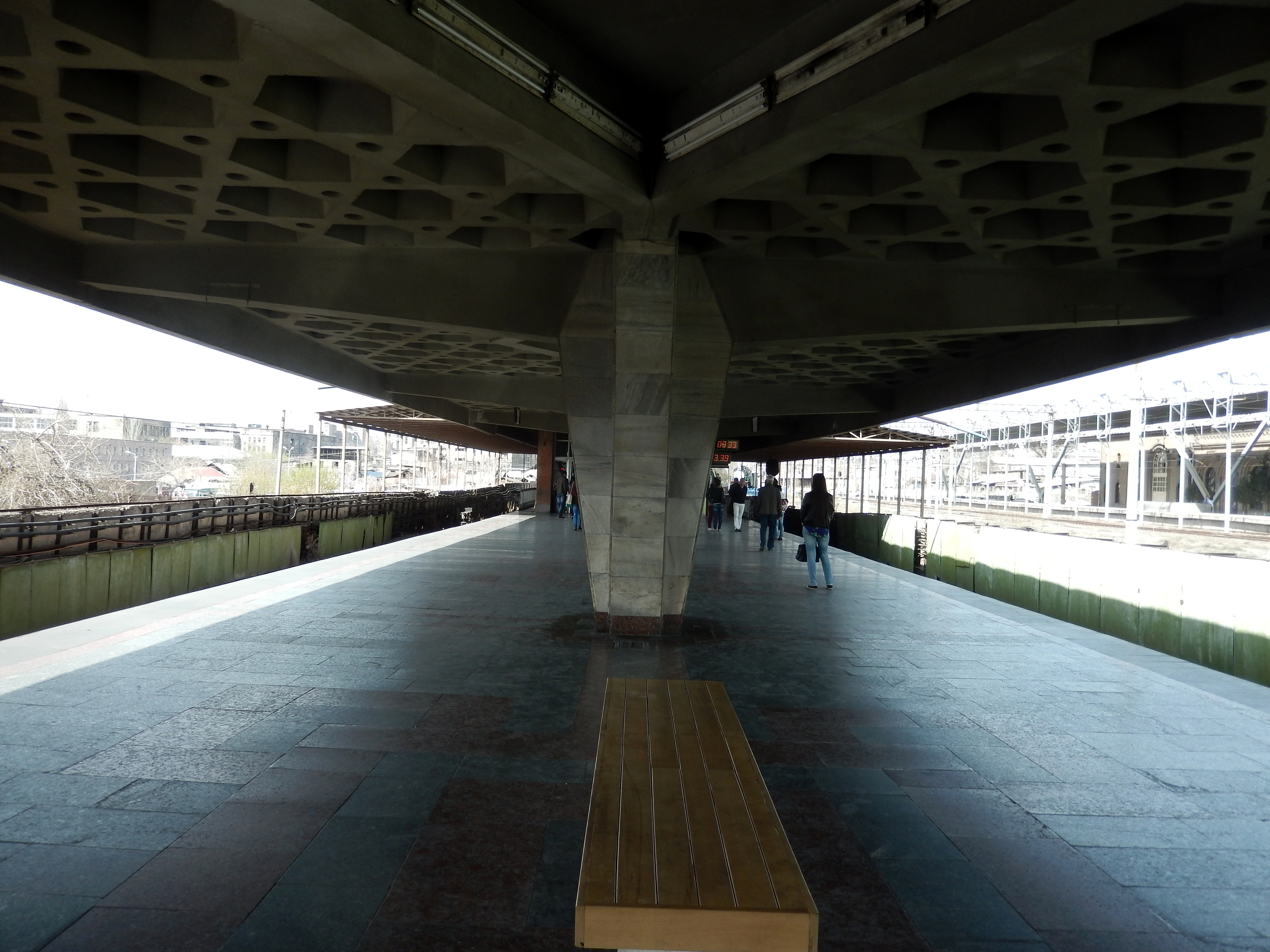

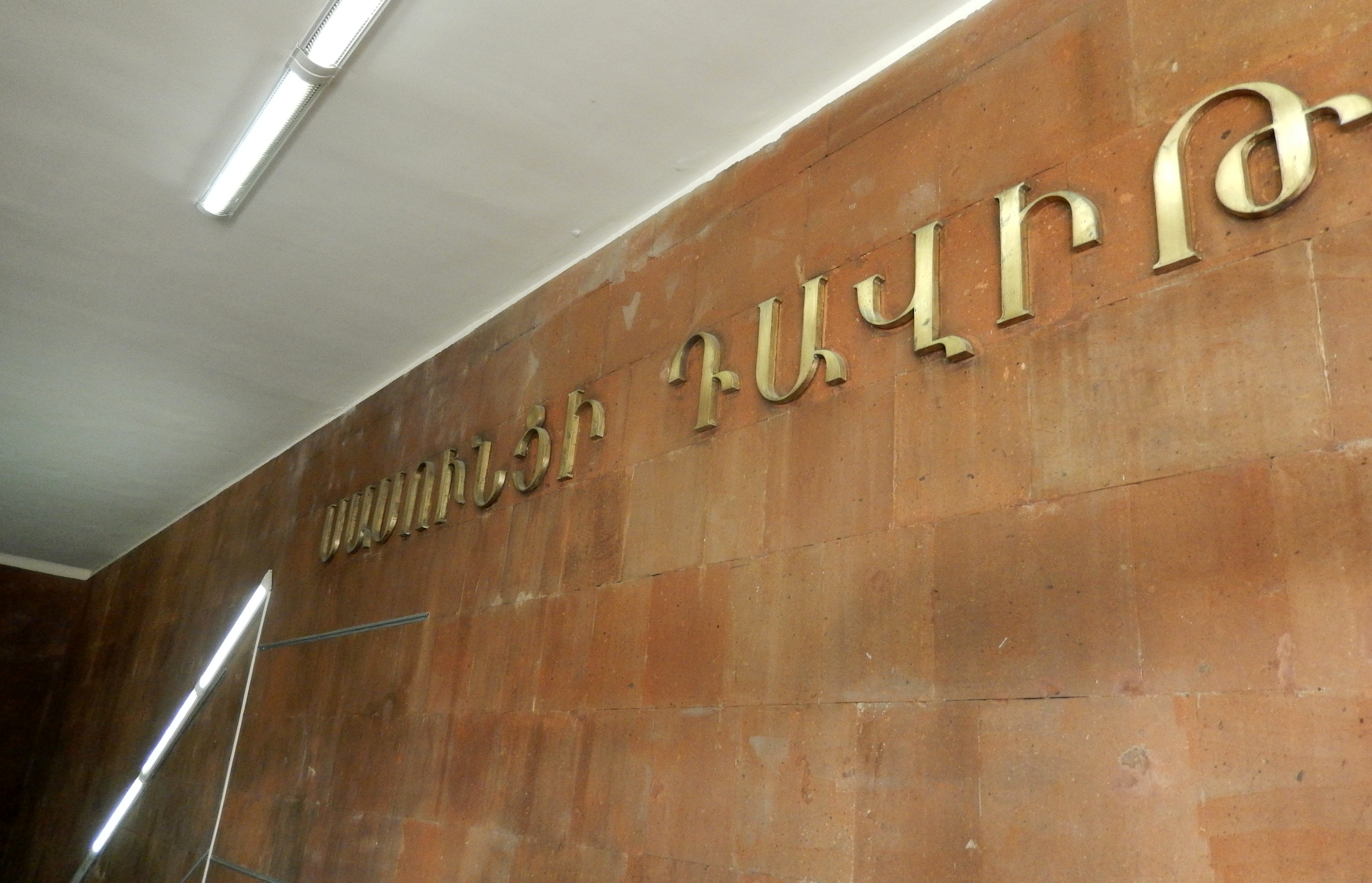

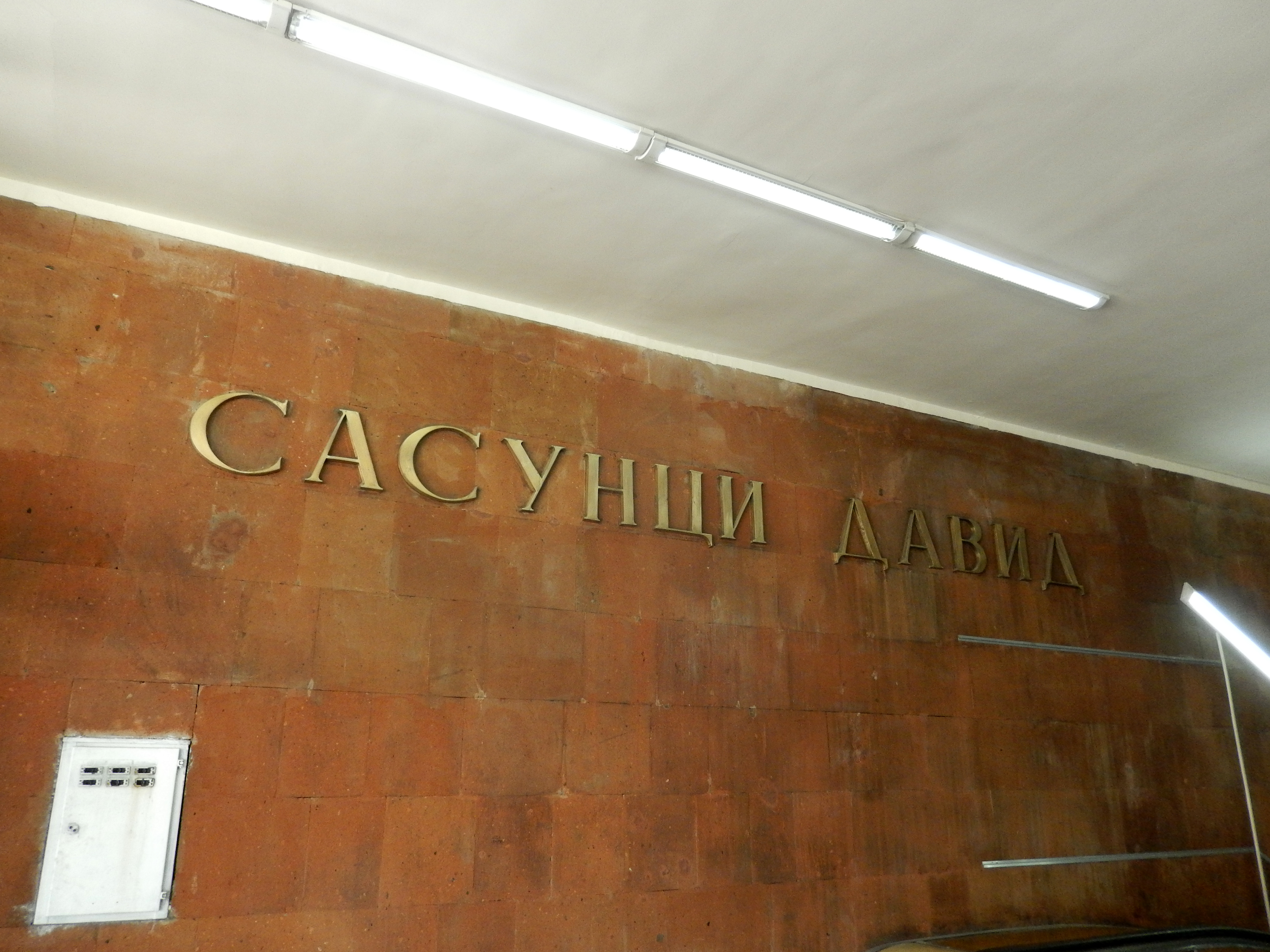

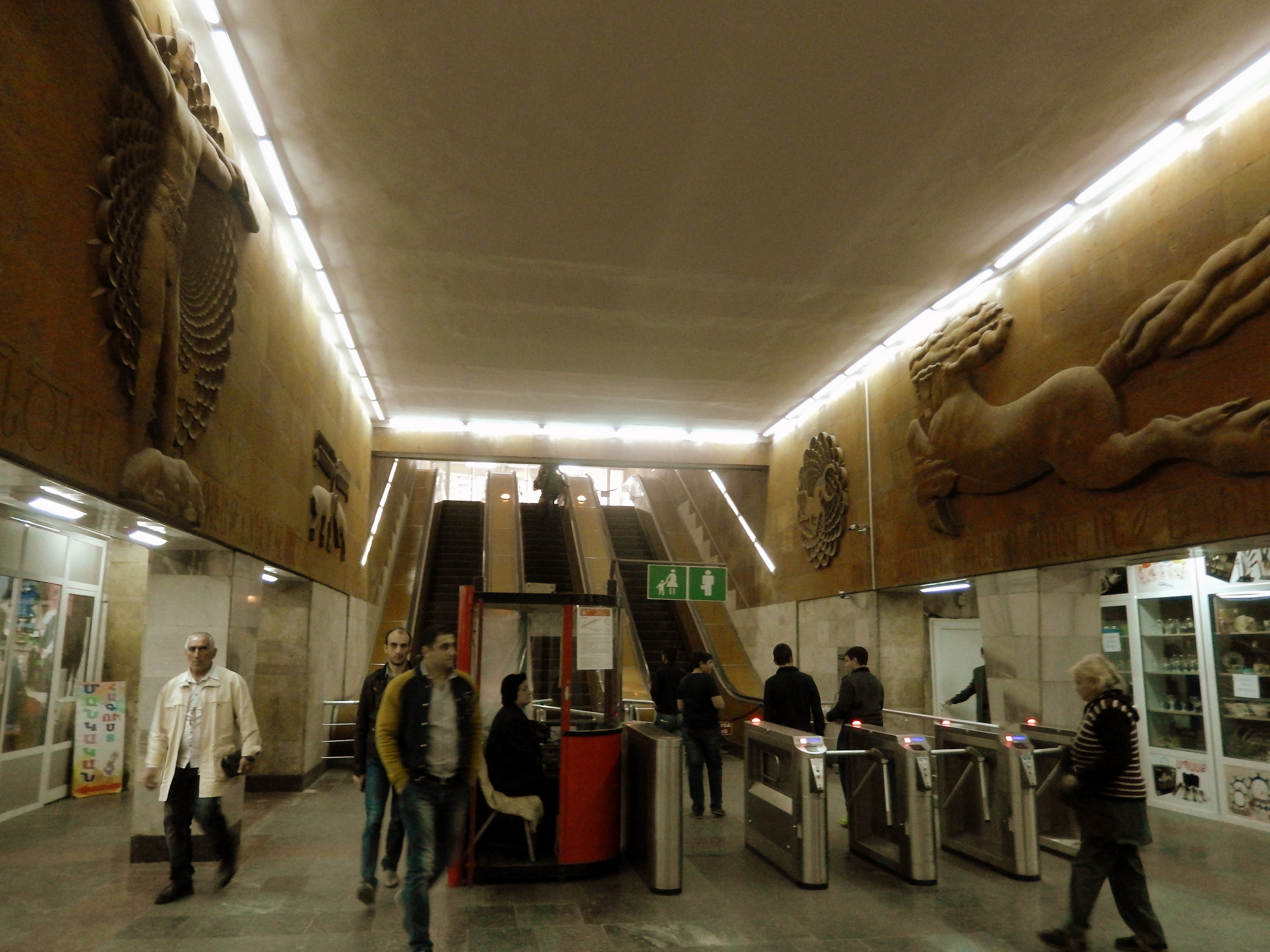

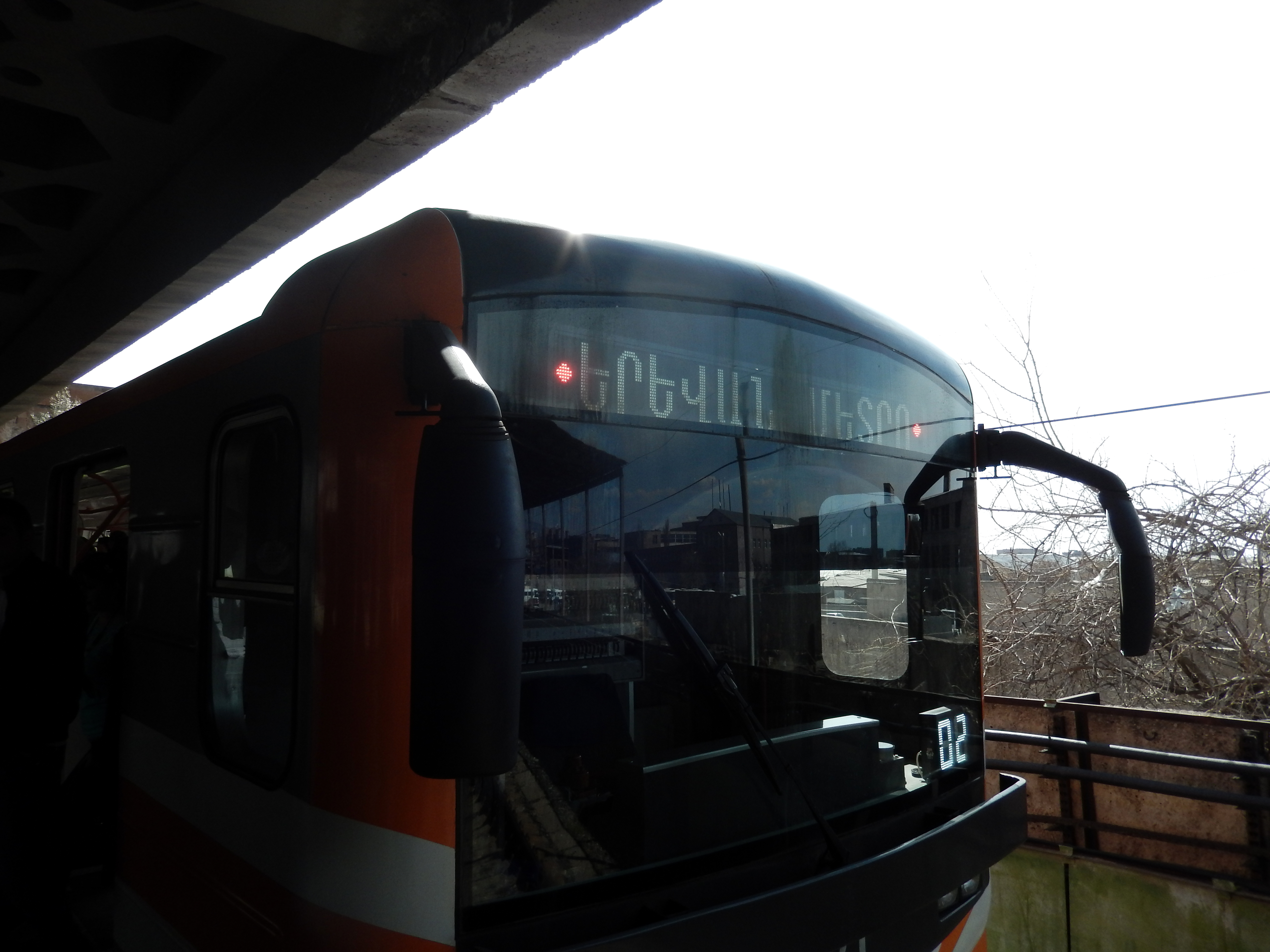

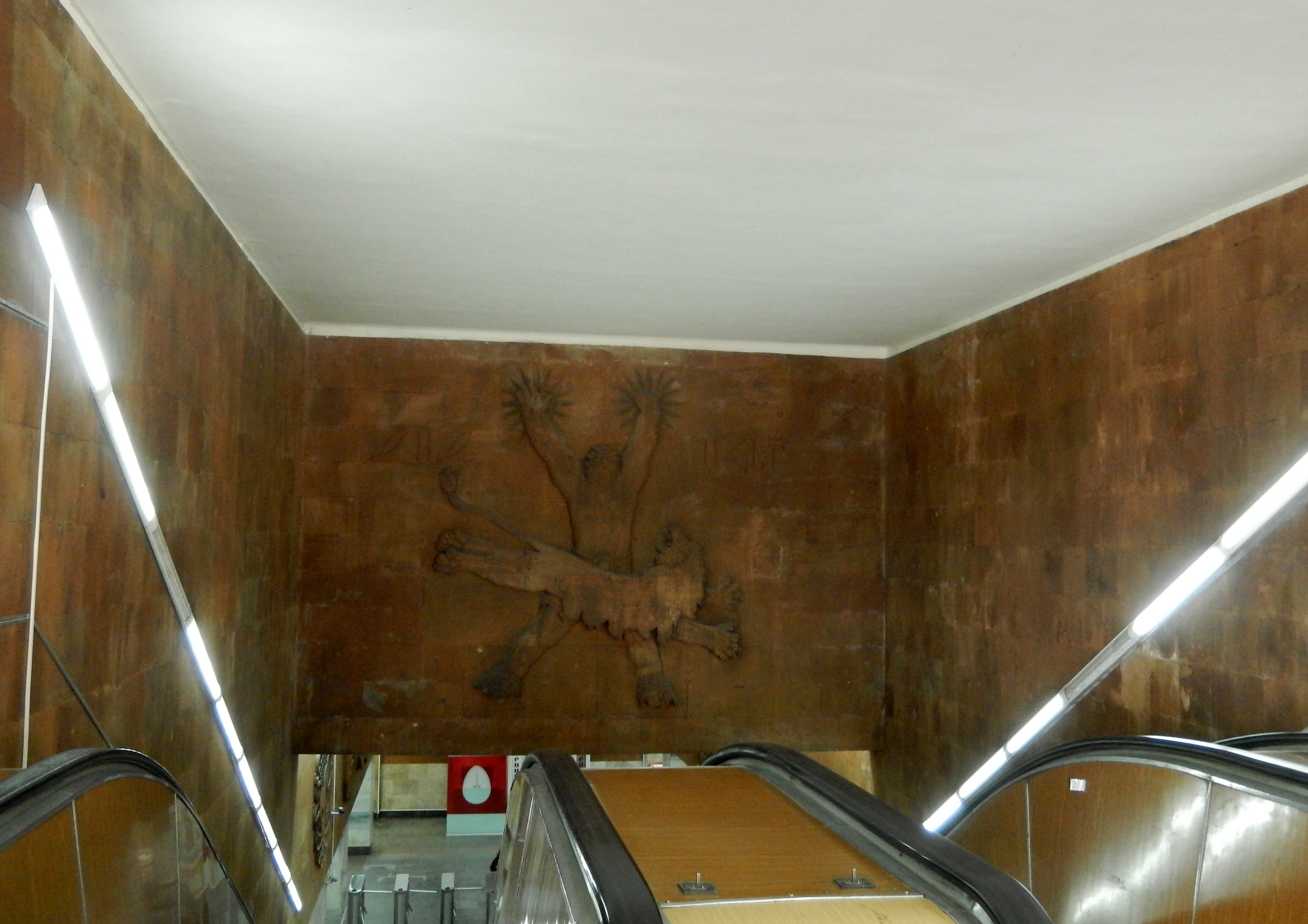
