= Gortsaranayin (Yerevan Metro) =

Yerevan Metro Station

Coordinates: 40.1405°N 44.4981°E

Gortsaranain
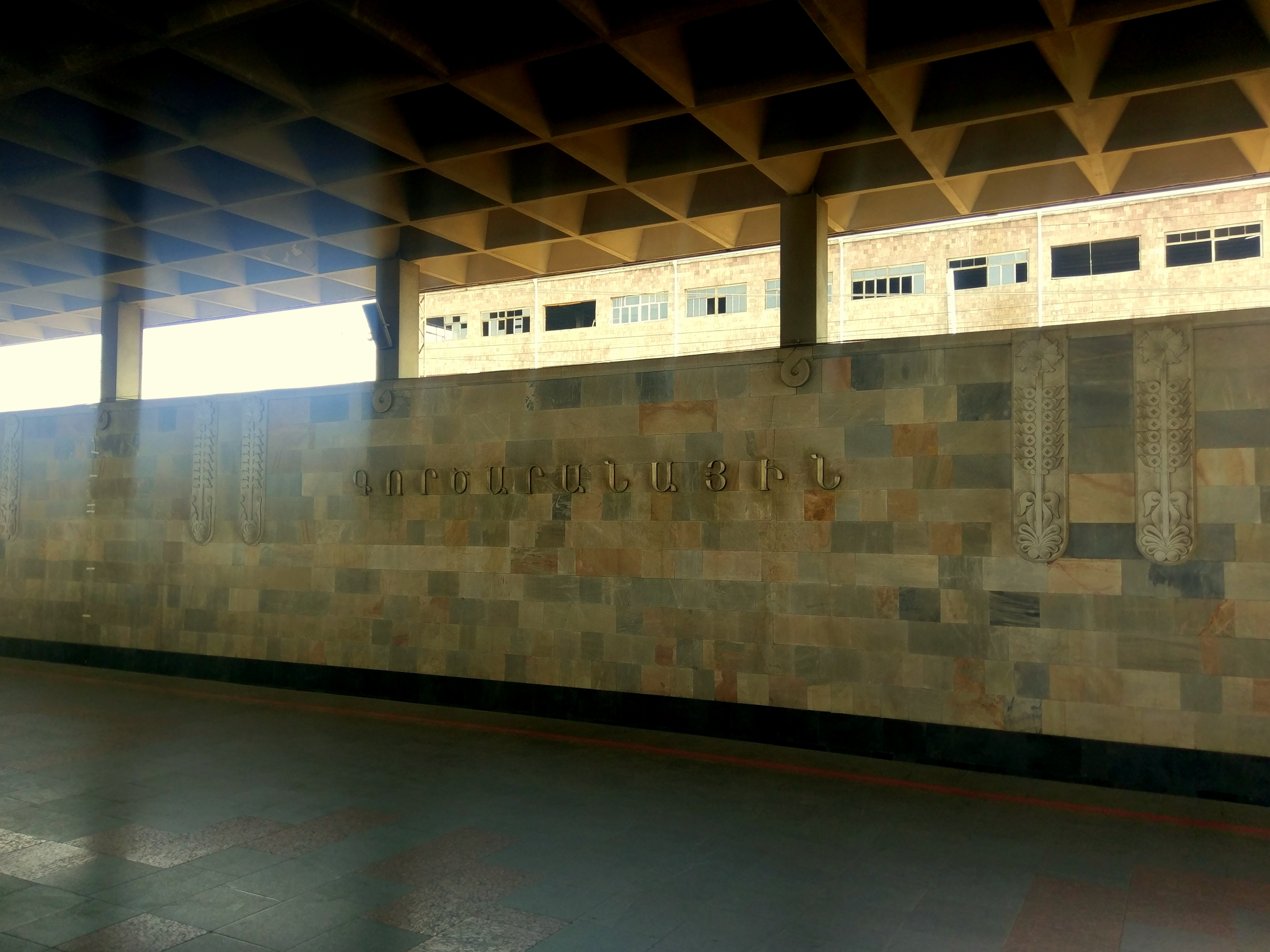
- Inside the station

General information
- System: Yerevan Metro station
- Operator: Yerevan Metro
- Platforms: 1
- Tracks: 2

Construction
- Structure type: Aboveground

History
- Opened: 11 June 1983

Services
Preceding station	Yerevan Metro	Following station
David of Sasun towards Barekamutyun	Karen Demirchyan Yerevan Subway	Shengavit towards Charbakh or Garegin Nzhdeh Square
Location

Gortsaranain (Armenian: Գործարանային, English: Factory) is a Yerevan Metro station, which opened on 11 July 1983. The station is located in the Shengavit District and exits at Shirak, Araratyan, and Tamantsiner streets, adjacent to the southern industrial zone.

The station is named after the numerous factories around it.

== Station design ==
The station was designed by architect Henrik Ghukasyan and features an industrial modernist aesthetic. The project's lead engineers were John Hovakimyan and Albert Shakaryan. The station's interior is clad in gray marble, with skylights between the walls and roof providing natural light. Around twenty flat decorative vertical pillars are placed along the walls, each with a unique ornament that is not repeated in other ones. The end wall at the exit to the platform is decorated with a bas-relief, "Song of Labor," by sculptor Levon Vardanyan.
