= General Andranik (Yerevan Metro) =

Yerevan Metro Station

Coordinates: 40.1717°N 44.5133°E

Zoravar Andranik
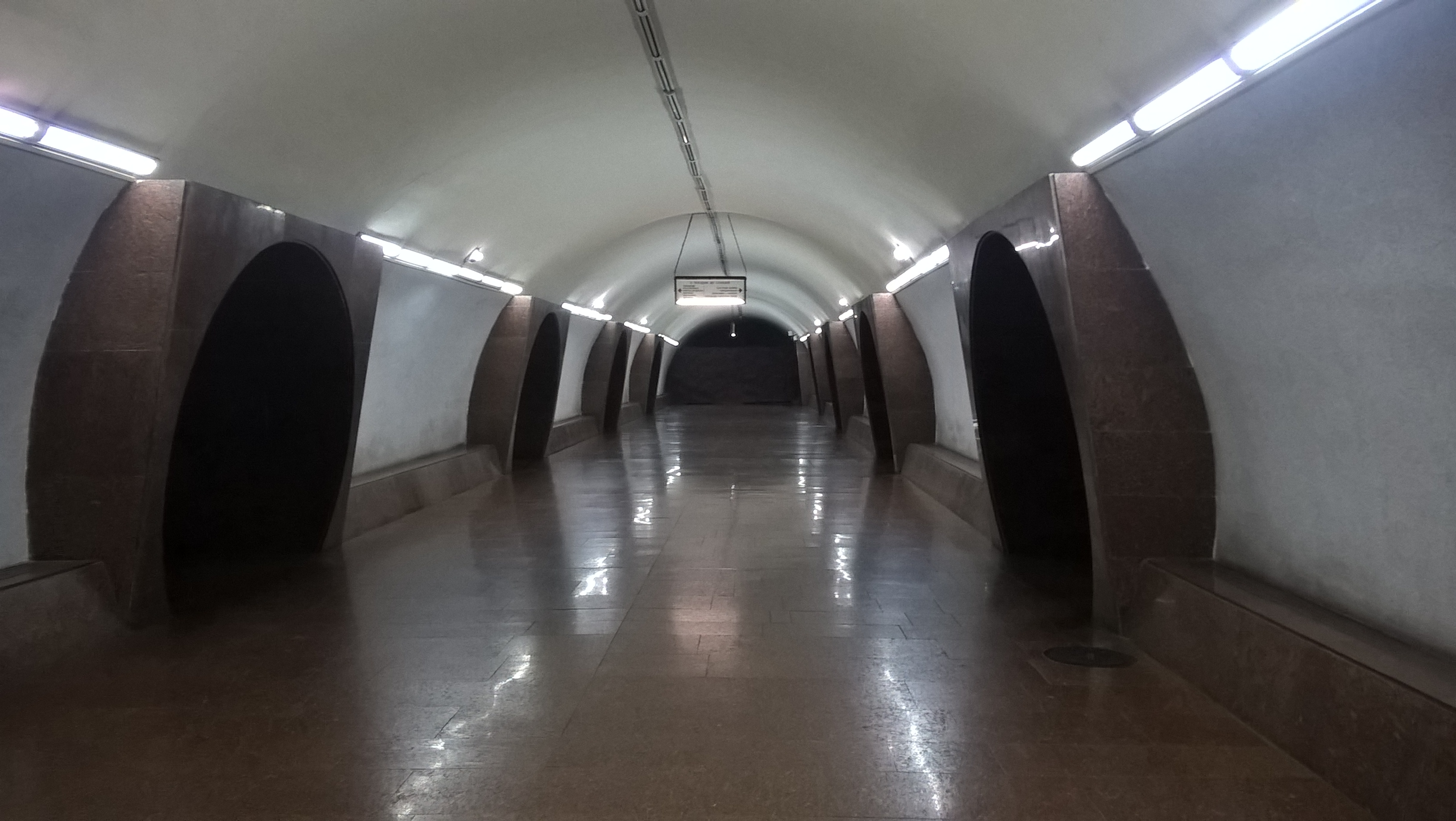
- Inside the station

General information
- System: Yerevan Metro station
- Operator: Yerevan Metro
- Platforms: 1
- Tracks: 2

Construction
- Structure type: Underground

History
- Opened: 26 December 1989
- Former names: Hoktemberyan

Services
Preceding station	Yerevan Metro	Following station
Republic Square towards Barekamutyun	Karen Demirchyan Yerevan Subway	David of Sasun towards Charbakh or Garegin Nzhdeh Square
Location

General Andranik (Armenian: Զորավար Անդրանիկ) is Yerevan Metro station, which opened on December 26, 1989. The station is located in the Kentron district and exits at Tigran The Great Avenue, Agathangelos, and Movses Khorenatsi streets, next to the "Rossia" mall, the monument to General Andranik, and the Cathedral of Saint Gregory the Illuminator.

It was named in honor of the Armenian military commander and statesman, a key figure of the Armenian national liberation movement Andranik Ozanyan. Until 1992, it was called "Hoktemberyan" in honor of the Bolshevik October Revolution.

== Station design ==
The station's architectural design was developed by Levon Sadoyan, Ruben Dzhulakyan and Suren Burkhadzhyan.

== Gallery ==
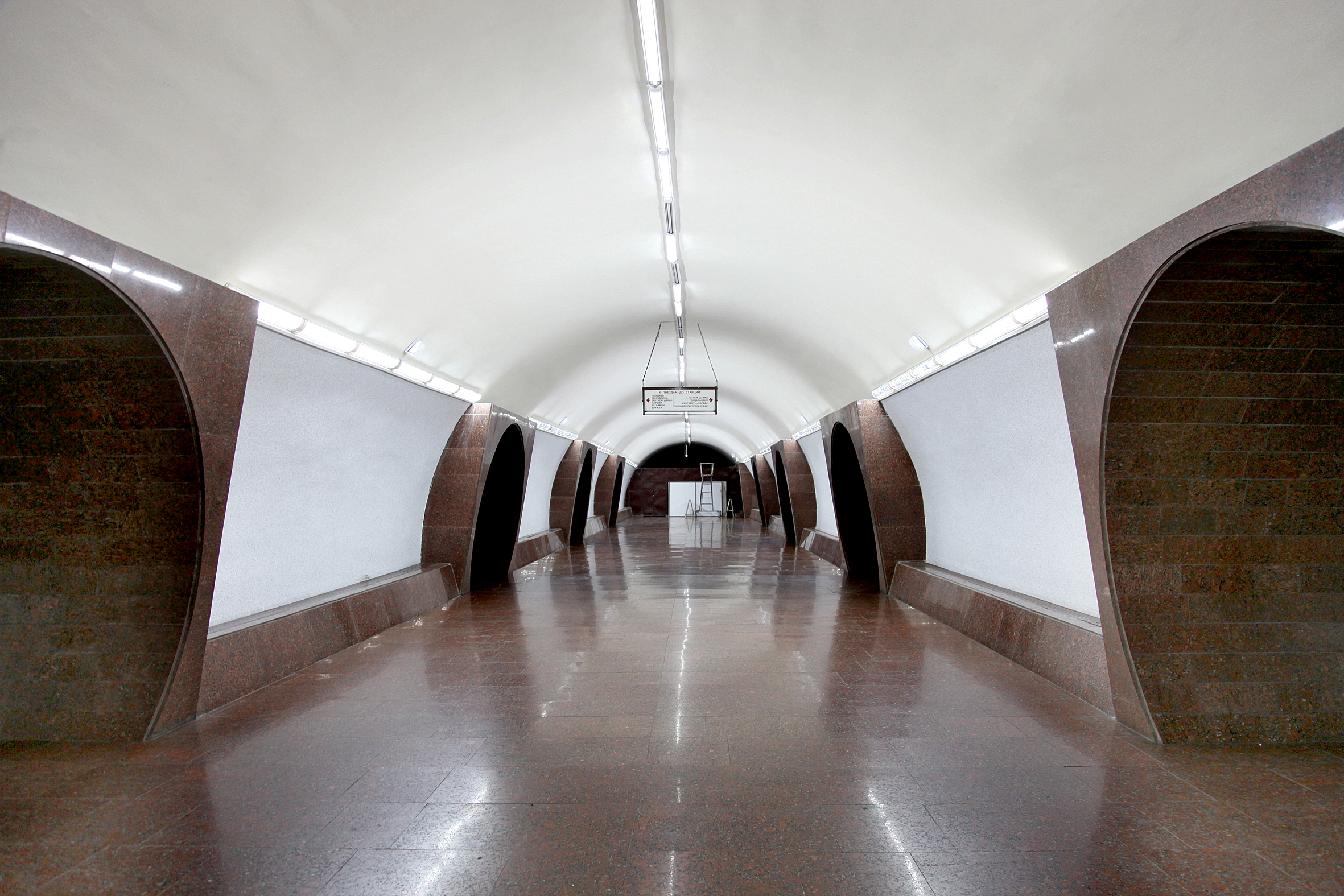

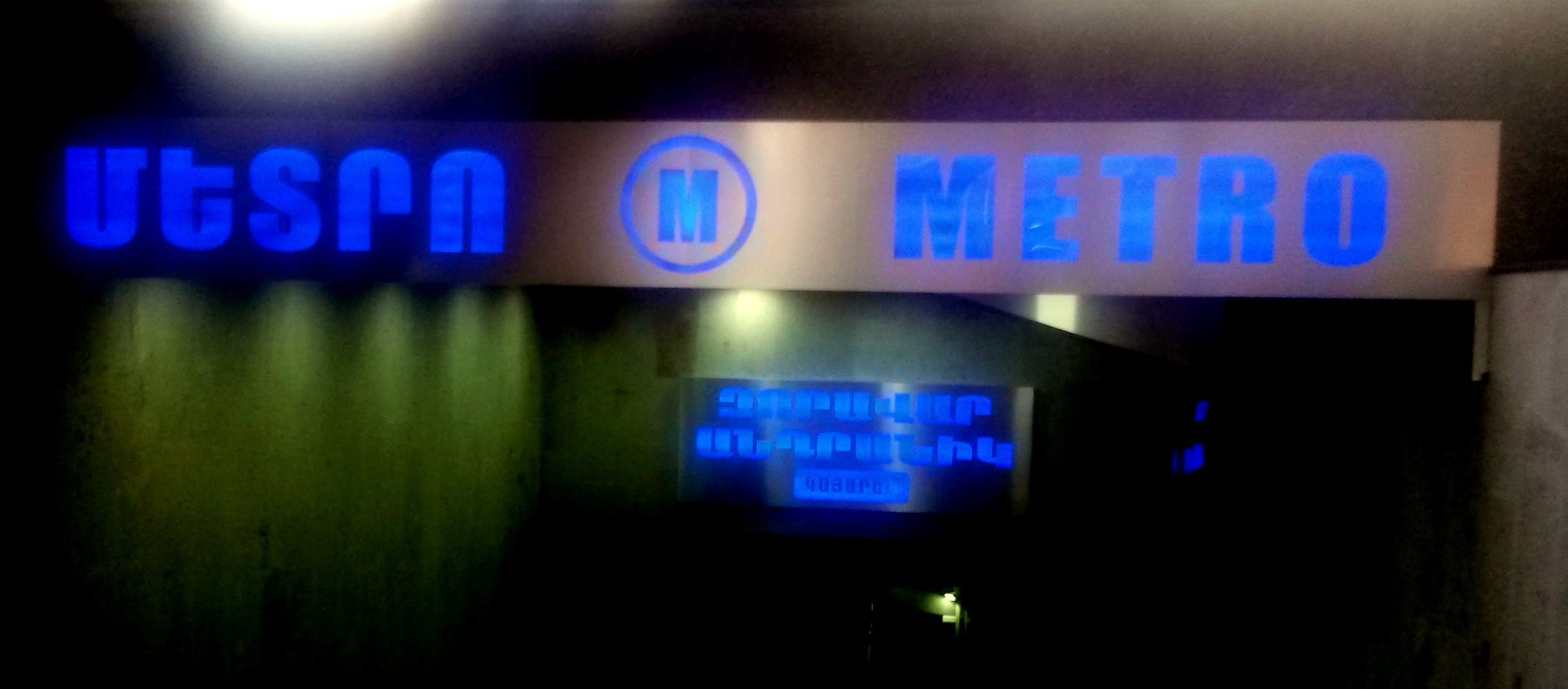
