= Yeritasardakan (Yerevan Metro) =

Yerevan Metro Station

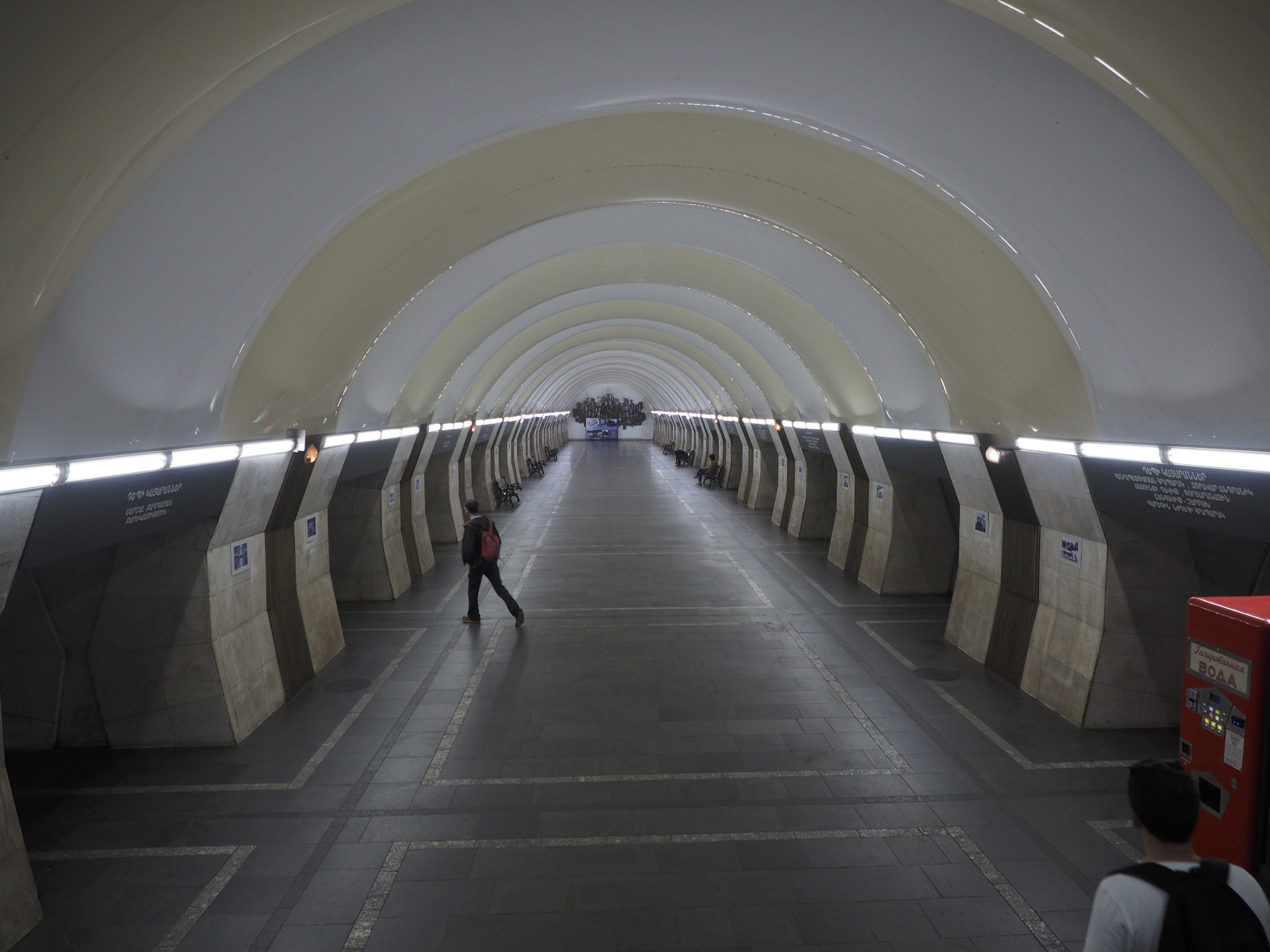
- Inside the station

General information
- Coordinates: 40.186944°N 44.521111°E
- System: Yerevan Metro station
- Operator: Yerevan Metro
- Platforms: 1
- Tracks: 2

Construction
- Structure type: Underground

Other information
- Website: yermetro.am/stations/eritasardakan/

History
- Opened: 8 March 1981

Services
Preceding station	Yerevan Metro	Following station
Marshal Baghramyan towards Barekamutyun	Karen Demirchyan Yerevan Subway	Republic Square towards Charbakh or Garegin Nzhdeh Square
Location

Yeritasardakan (Armenian: Երիտասարդական, English: Youth) is a Yerevan Metro station, which was opened on 7 March 1981. The station is located in Kentron District and has an exit on Isahakyan Street.

Station named after the youth of Armenia, a designation chosen due to its close proximity to the country's leading higher education institutions.

== Station design ==
The architect of the station is Stepan Kyurkchyan, and the constructor is Ilya Manucharyan. The interior decoration is made of light gray marble. The columns of the waiting room are decorated with vertical decorative metal meshes, which cover the ventilation devices installed in the columns. On the wall is the bas-relief "Youth" by Ruzan Kyurkchyan, a sculptor and a member of the Artists' Union of the USSR.

== Gallery ==
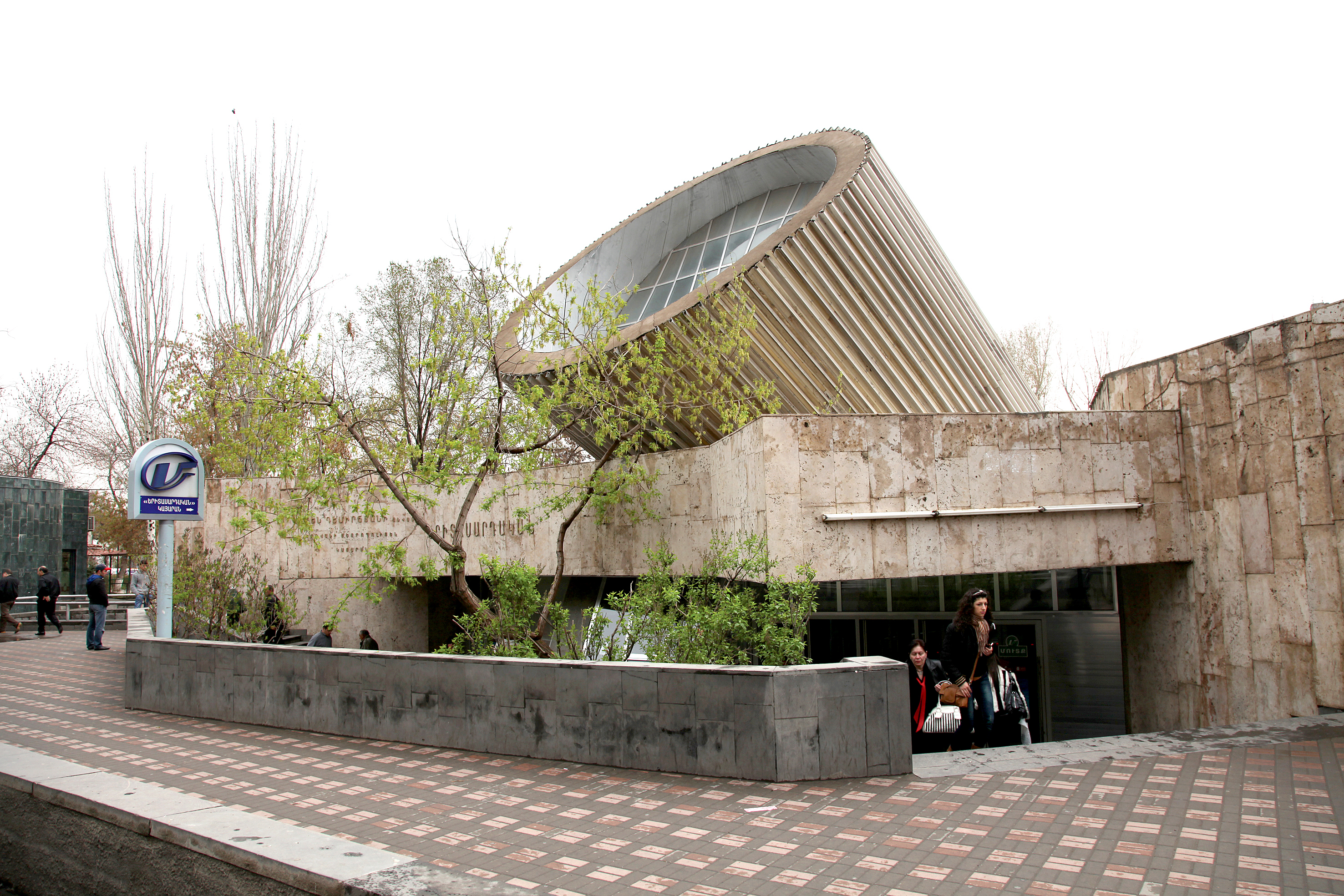
The entrance to the station

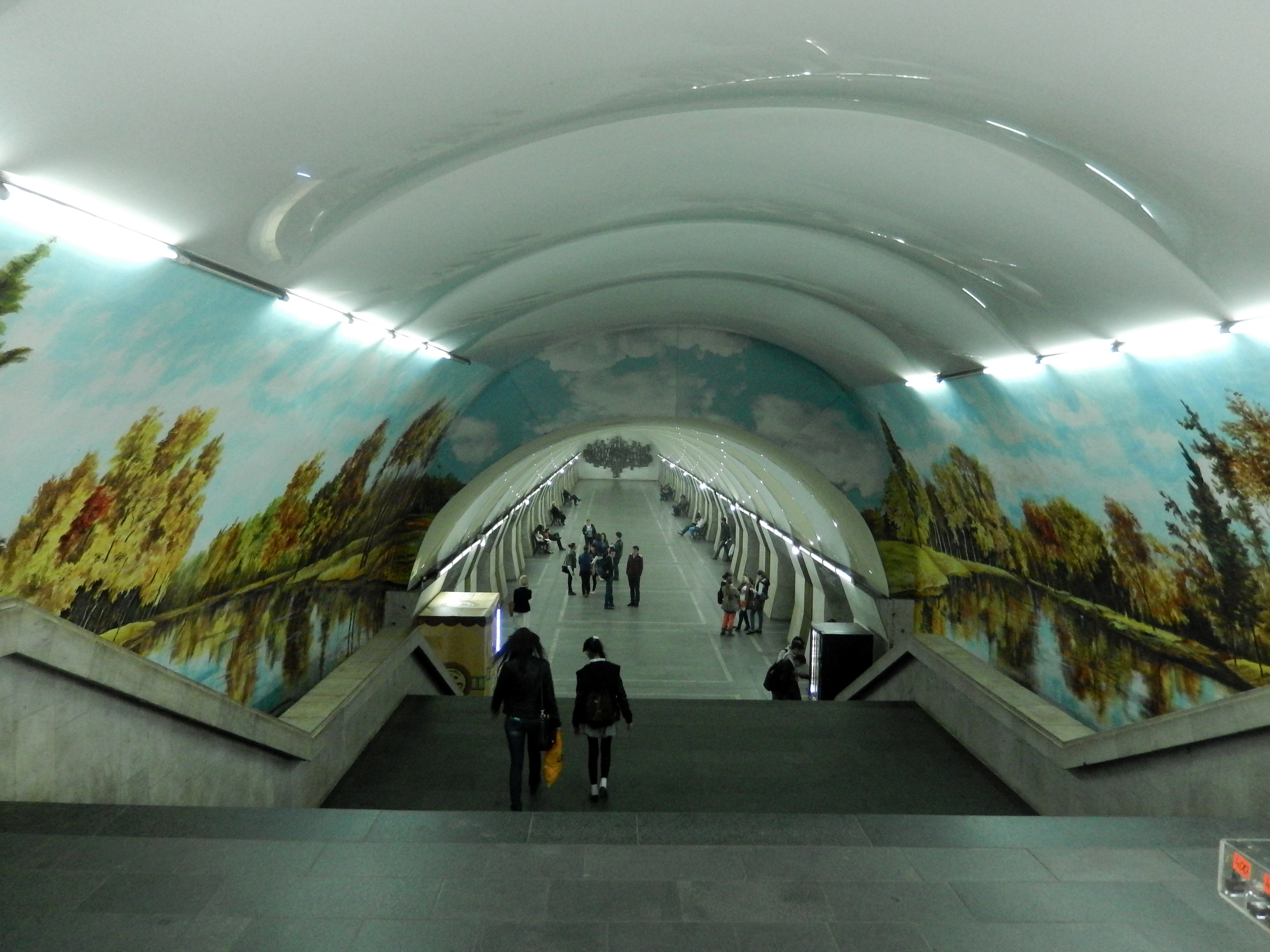
Inside the station
