= Marshal Baghramyan (Yerevan Metro) =

Yerevan Metro Station

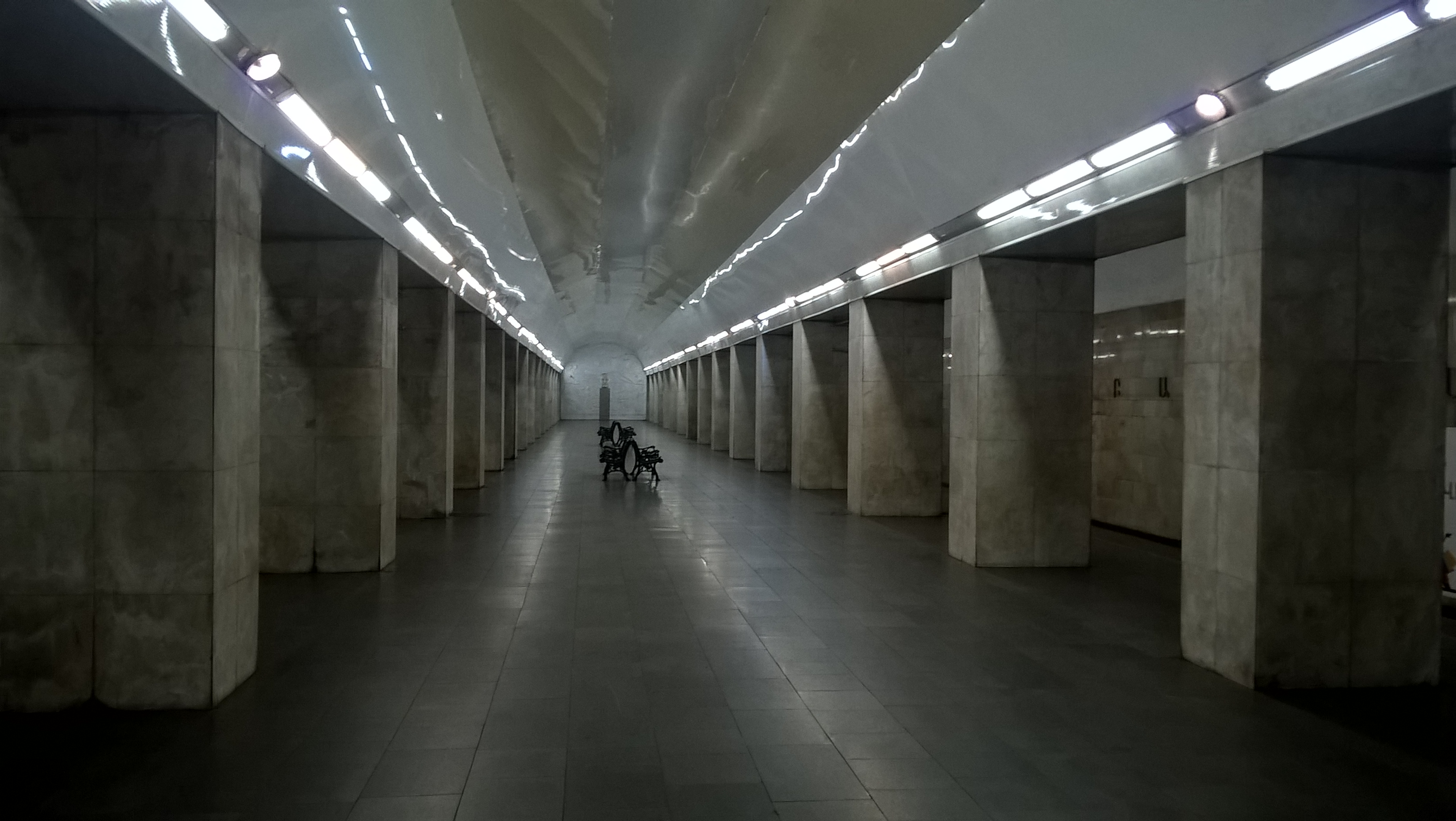
- Inside the station

General information
- Coordinates: 40.191694°N 44.505944°E
- System: Yerevan Metro station
- Operator: Yerevan Metro
- Platforms: 1
- Tracks: 2

Construction
- Structure type: Underground

Other information
- Website: yermetro.am/stations/bagramyan/

History
- Opened: 7 March 1981
- Former names: Saralandzhi

Services
Preceding station	Yerevan Metro	Following station
Barekamutyun Terminus	Karen Demirchyan Yerevan Subway	Yeritasardakan towards Charbakh or Garegin Nzhdeh Square
Location

Marshal Baghramyan (Armenian: Մարշալ Բաղրամյան) is a station of the Yerevan Metro, which opened on 7 March 1981. The station is located in the Kentron District of Yerevan and exits to Marshal Baghramyan Avenue, near the residence of the President of Armenia, Lovers' Park, the building of the National Assembly of Armenia and the Armenian National Academy of Sciences.

Until 1983, the station was called "Saralanj". In 1983, it was named in honor of Soviet military commander of Armenian descent, Hovhannes Baghramyan who led the cavalry squadron of national defense at the Battle of Sardarabad.

== Station design ==
The station's architectural design is maintained in a strict, monumental style, characteristic of Soviet metro construction in the early 1980s. The station's interior is decorated with marble cladding, granite floors, and decorative elements, including bas-reliefs dedicated to Marshal Baghramyan.

The architects of the station are Honored Architect of the Armenian SSR Spartak Knteghtsyan and Honored Architect of Armenia Albert Zurabyan. The main designer of the station is Ilya Manucharyan.
