= Shengavit (Yerevan Metro) =

Yerevan Metro Station

Coordinates: 40.1453°N 44.4849°E

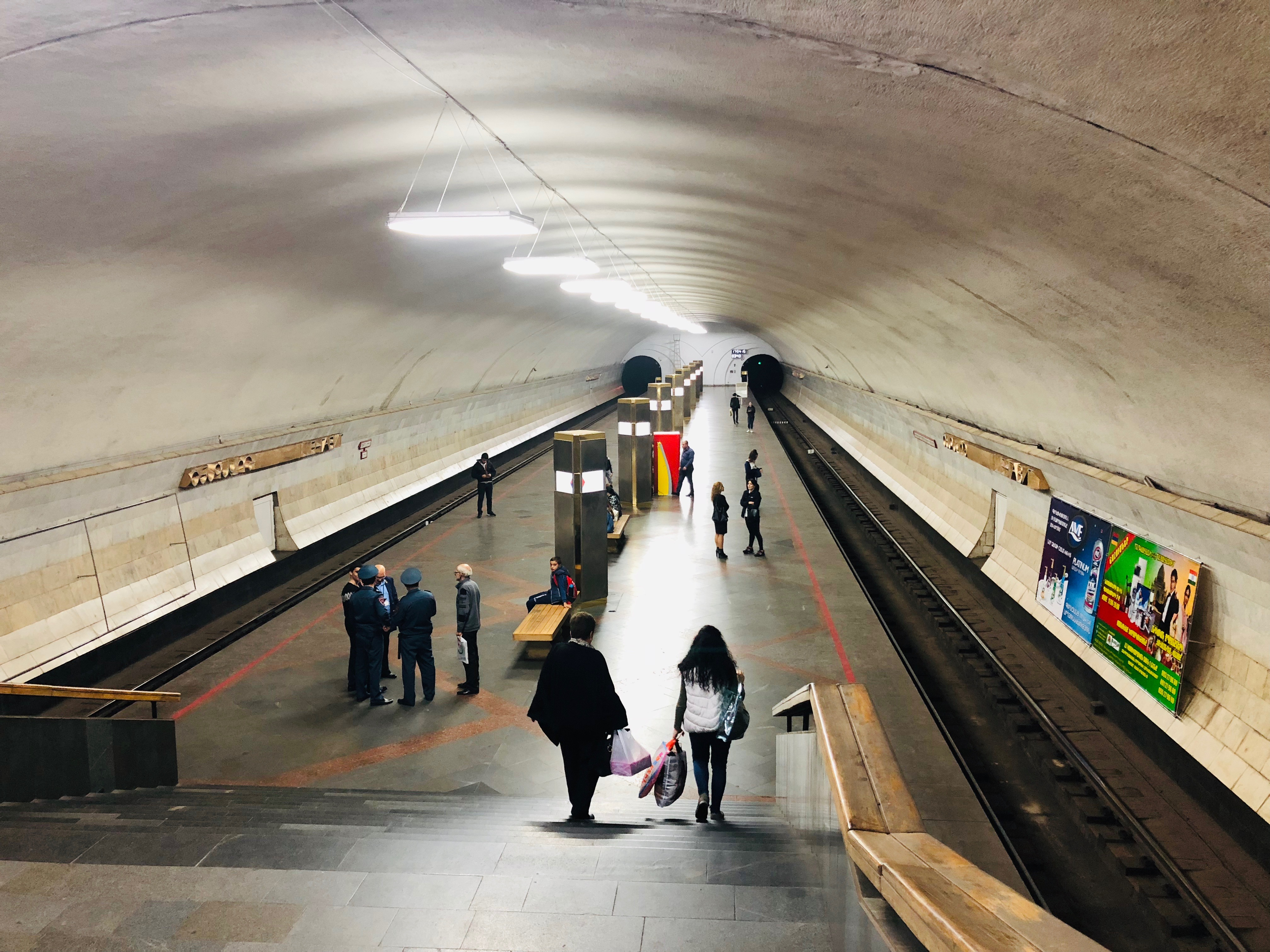
- The entrance to the station

General information
- System: Yerevan Metro station
- Operator: Yerevan Metro
- Platforms: 1
- Tracks: 2

Construction
- Structure type: Underground

History
- Opened: February 15, 1986

Services
Preceding station	Yerevan Metro	Following station
Gortsaranayin towards Barekamutyun	Karen Demirchyan Yerevan Subway	Charbakh Terminus
Gortsaranayin towards Barekamutyun	Karen Demirchyan Yerevan Subway	Garegin Nzhdeh Square Terminus
Location

Shengavit (Armenian: Շենգավիթ), is a Yerevan Metro station opened on February 15, 1986. The station has a two-way route to Garegin Nzhdeh Square station in one direction and Charbakh station in the other direction. The station is located in the Shengavit District and exits at Arthur Karapetyan's Park, Soghomon Tarontsi and Shengavit 9th Streets.

== Station design ==
The architectural design of the station was developed by architects R. Dzhulakyan, S. Burkhadzhyan and A. Mirzoyan.

The space is designed in a strict industrial style: the platform is clad in gray granite, and eight decorative rectangular stainless steel columns are installed in its center. The tunnel walls are lined with white marble with a black border along the bottom edge, repeating the contour of the tunnel. The columns are fitted with recessed lighting that illuminates the station through openings above, creating a soft, diffused light.

Initially, the station's lighting included column lamps and cornice lighting, but this was later replaced by brighter square chandeliers placed along the axis of the vault.

== Gallery ==
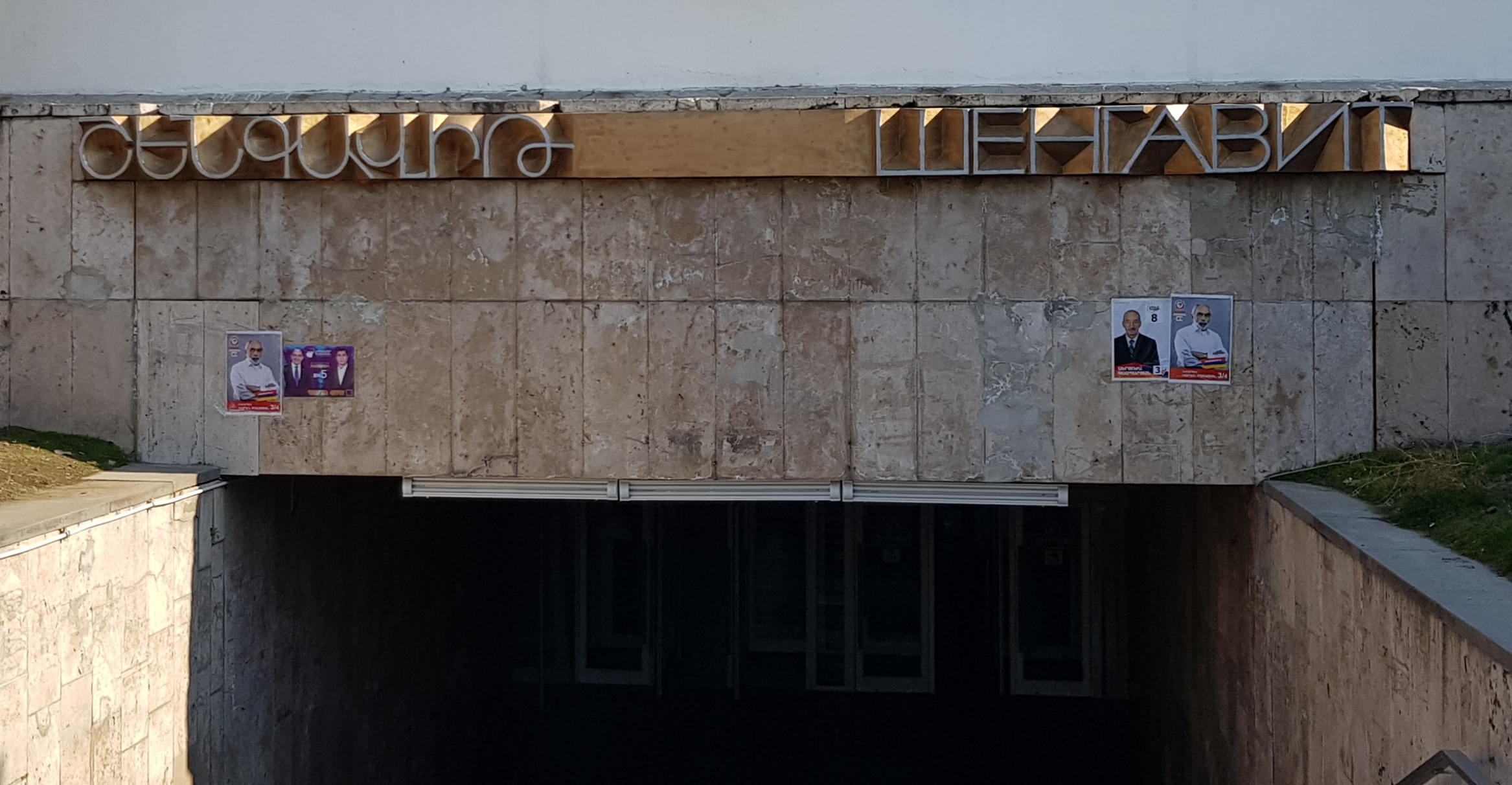
Entrance of the station
