= Yerevan Metro =

Metro system in Yerevan, Armenia

Karen Demirchyan Yerevan Metro
- Yerevan Metro's official logo

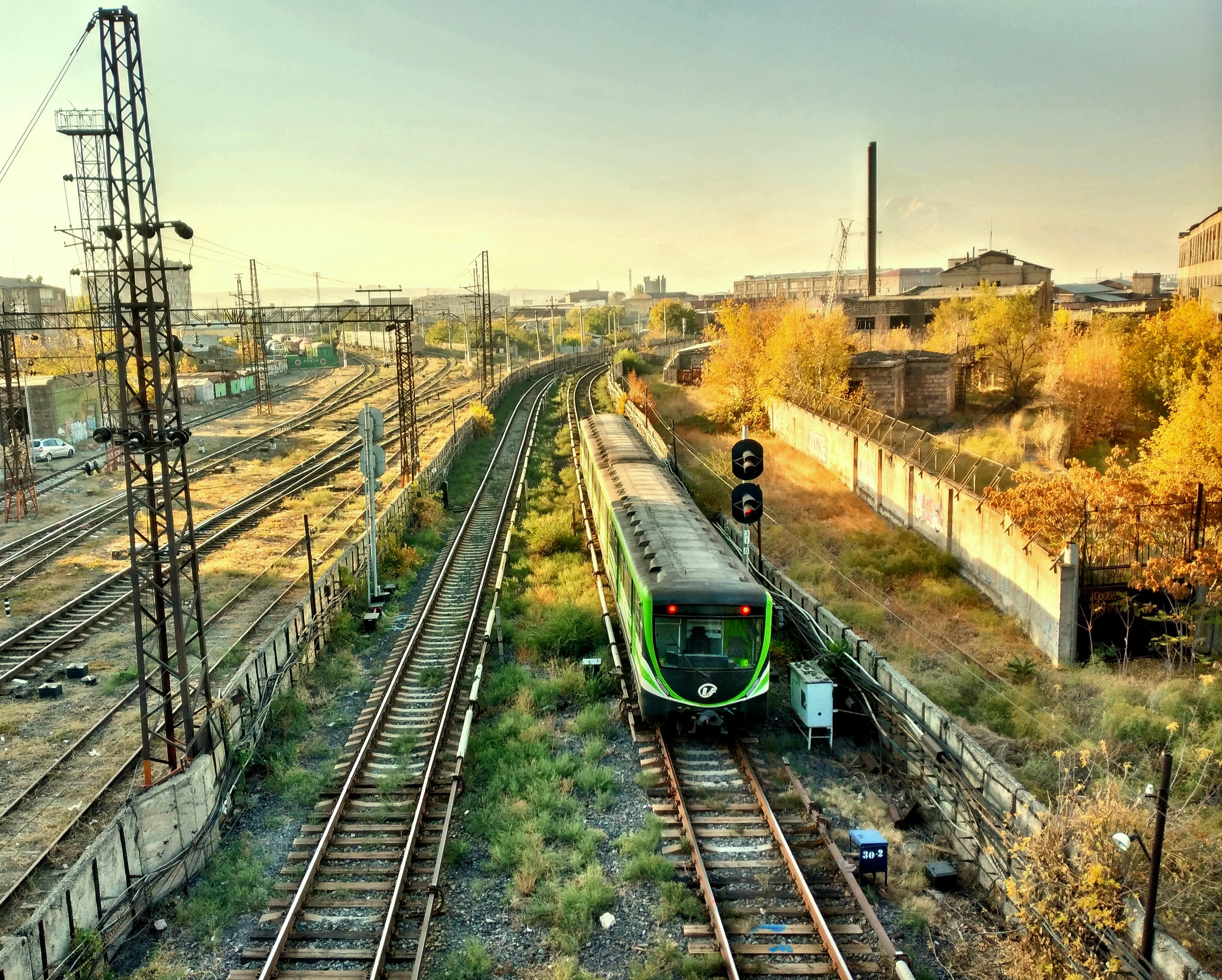

Overview
- Native name: Կարեն Դեմիրճյանի անվան Երևանի մետրոպոլիտեն
- Owner: Government of Armenia, Yerevan Municipality
- Locale: Yerevan, Armenia
- Transit type: Rapid transit
- Number of lines: 1(2 more planned)
- Number of stations: 10 (total 12 more planned - 1 of them under construction)
- Daily ridership: 81.000 (2023)
- Annual ridership: 29.6 million
- Chief executive: Babken Sedrakyan (acting)
- Website: yermetro.am

Operation
- Began operation: 7 March 1981; 44 years ago
- Operator: Karen Demirchyan Yerevan Subway CJSC
- Number of vehicles: 70 (1-3 Carriages per Trainset)

Technical
- System length: 13.4 km (8.3 mi)
- Track gauge: 1,524 mm (5 ft)
- Electrification: 825 V DC third rail
- Top speed: 80 km/h (50 mph)

Map of the Yerevan Metro

The Yerevan Metro (Armenian: Կարեն Դեմիրճյանի անվան Երևանի մետրոպոլիտեն, Karen Demirchyani anvan Yerevani metropoliten; since December 1999), is a rapid transit system that serves the capital of Armenia, Yerevan. Opened on 7 March 1981, it was the eighth metro system in the former Soviet Union. Owned by the government, it is operated by the Karen Demirchyan Yerevan Subway CJSC of the Ministry of Transport and Communication. The metro is named after Soviet Armenian leader Karen Demirchyan.

As of 2025, the Yerevan Metro has 10 stations located on a single double-track line (as well as a single-track shuttle branch between Charbakh and Shengavit), with a total length of 13.4 km. There are deep-level and shallow-level stations, as well as three above-ground stations. All Yerevan metro stations were opened in the 1980s, except Charbakh station which was opened in 1996. The construction work for an 11th station is expected to begin in 2026.

In terms of the length of lines in operation, it ranks 169th in the world, 14th among the metro systems of the former USSR (after Moscow, Saint Petersburg, Tashkent, Kyiv, Minsk, Kharkiv, Baku, Tbilisi, Nizhny Novgorod, Novosibirsk, Kazan, Samara and Yekaterinburg), and third in the Transcaucasus.

== History ==
The history of the Yerevan Metro began in the late 1960s under the leadership of Anton Kochinyan, First Secretary of the Communist Party of Armenia. At that time, the population of Yerevan exceeded 700 thousand people, which exacerbated the city's transportation problems. The historically developed old urban development with a network of narrow streets in the centre, the difficult terrain and the remoteness of new districts limited the possibility of normal operation of ground transportation. Consequently, the decision was made to build an overhead transportation system. However, since metro construction was unacceptable in cities with populations under one million, a high-speed tram with several underground stations was chosen instead.

Kavgiprotrans specialists visited Yerevan several times, conducting feasibility studies and developing design documentation. When selecting the route for the first phase of the Yerevan Metro, the goal was to connect densely populated residential areas with the railway station and the city's industrial zone, and to reduce the unproductive time spent traveling from home to work and back. The Armgiprotrans Institute designed the tunnels, and the Yerevanproject Institute designed the station vestibules. Everything was calculated according to the dimensions and technical requirements of the metro. The station platforms were designed to accommodate five-car trains with a capacity of 40 trains per hour and a 90-minute headway.

In 1972, construction of a high-speed tram began, with the possibility of converting the tunnels into a metro system in the future.

By the end of 1978, approximately 4 kilometres of tunnels had been built. However, in 1981, the Central Committee of the Communist Party of the Soviet Union and the Council of Ministers of the USSR issued a decree on the construction of a metro in Yerevan, which spurred widespread planning and construction of the underground transport artery as a metro. Its launch was planned for November 7, 1980, but only a test train, carrying representatives of the Central Committee of the Communist Party of the Armenian SSR, ran on that day. The State Commission signed the commissioning certificate for the launch complex on February 24, 1981 (the opening day of the 26th Congress of the CPSU), and the metro's official opening took place on March 7, 1981.

The 7.6-kilometre-long (of which 1.9 kilometres was above-ground) launch section of the first phase included four stations: Barekamutyun (Friendship), Saralanj (now Marshal Bagramyan), Yeritasardakan (Youth), and David of Sasun. With a delay of several months, in December of the same year, the intermediate station “Lenin Square” (now “Republic Square”) was opened.

In 1989, the first phase of the line was completed, adding the following stations to the existing ones: General Andranik, Gortsaranayin (Factory), Shengavit, and Suren Spandaryan Square (now "Garegin Nzhdeh Square"). The Charbakh depot opened simultaneously with the Shengavit station.

After the construction of the Garegin Nzhdeh Square station, there were plans to extend the line north, to the Ajapnyak residential area. However, these plans were dashed by the collapse of the USSR. The last station, Charbakh, was opened in 1996.

From April 1 to May 18, 2020, the metro was closed due to the COVID-19 pandemic.

=== Timeline ===
Line	Segment	Date opened
1	Barekamutyun–David of Sasun	8 March 1981
1	David of Sasun–Gortsaranayin	11 July 1983
1	Gortsaranayin–Shengavit	26 December 1985
1	Shengavit–Garegin Nzhdeh Square	4 January 1987
1	Shengavit–Charbakh	26 December 1996

=== Name changes ===
In 1983, the Saralanj station was renamed in honor of the commander of the cavalry squadron of national defense at the Battle of Sardarabad, Soviet military commander of Armenian descent, Hovhannes Baghramyan.

After the collapse of the USSR and Armenia's restoration of independence, the names of three stations were changed in 1992:

- Lenin Square station was renamed Republic Square station,
- Hoktemberyan station was renamed General Andranik station,
- Spandaryan Square station was renamed Garegin Nzhdeh Square station.

Station	Previous name(s)	Years
Marshal Baghramyan	Saralanj	1981–1982
Republic Square	Lenin Square	1981–1992
Garegin Nzhdeh Square	Spandaryan Square	1987–1992
General Andranik	Hoktemberyan	1989–1992

== Payment system ==
At the time of its opening, access to the station was via automated ticket machines. The fare was paid in 5-kopeck coins.

After 1991, coins were replaced first by metal and then plastic tokens.

In May 2009, new turnstiles from the Kharkiv plant "LOT" were installed, supporting both tokens and plastic cards.

Since November 2023, Telpo T20 validators have been installed at Yerevan metro stations. They scan QR codes from phones or paper tickets. QR codes can be purchased in the Telcell Wallet app or single-use paper tickets can be purchased at a Telcell terminal.

As of November 1, 2024, support for tokens has been discontinued. Fare payment is processed using a QR code, which can be purchased in the Telcell Wallet app (valid for 4 days from purchase), Telcell terminals (valid for 3 days from purchase), and at the ticket office. Payment is also possible with an NFC-enabled bank card and a Telcell transport card, which can be purchased at a special Telcell terminal, at all metro ticket offices, in administrative district buildings (district administrations), at Telcell offices, and at information points in Republic and Freedom Squares.

As of August 1, 2025, support for paper tickets was discontinued.

== Facts and numbers ==
- The metro route passes through basalt lava flows, lacustrine-alluvial deposits, sandy-clayey and silty rocks, which created difficult conditions during construction.
- In 1981, 14 million people used the metro annually; by 1987, this figure had already reached 31 million (representing 9% of the passenger traffic of all modes of transport). In 2001, this number was 15.5 million passengers. In 2008, the metro carried 18 million passengers, and in 2011, 17 million. Currently, the metro is used by 50,000 to 60,000 people daily.
- During rush hours, the interval between trains is 5 minutes, at other times - up to 10 minutes.

== Stations ==
The single red line with a shuttle branch has 10 stations:

- Barekamutyun (Friendship)
- Marshal Baghramyan
- Yeritasardakan (Youth)
- Republic Square
- Zoravar Andranik (General Andranik)
- Sasuntsi Davit (David of Sasun)
- Gortsaranayin (Factory)
- Shengavit
- Charbakh
- Garegin Nzhdeh Square

== Development prospects ==
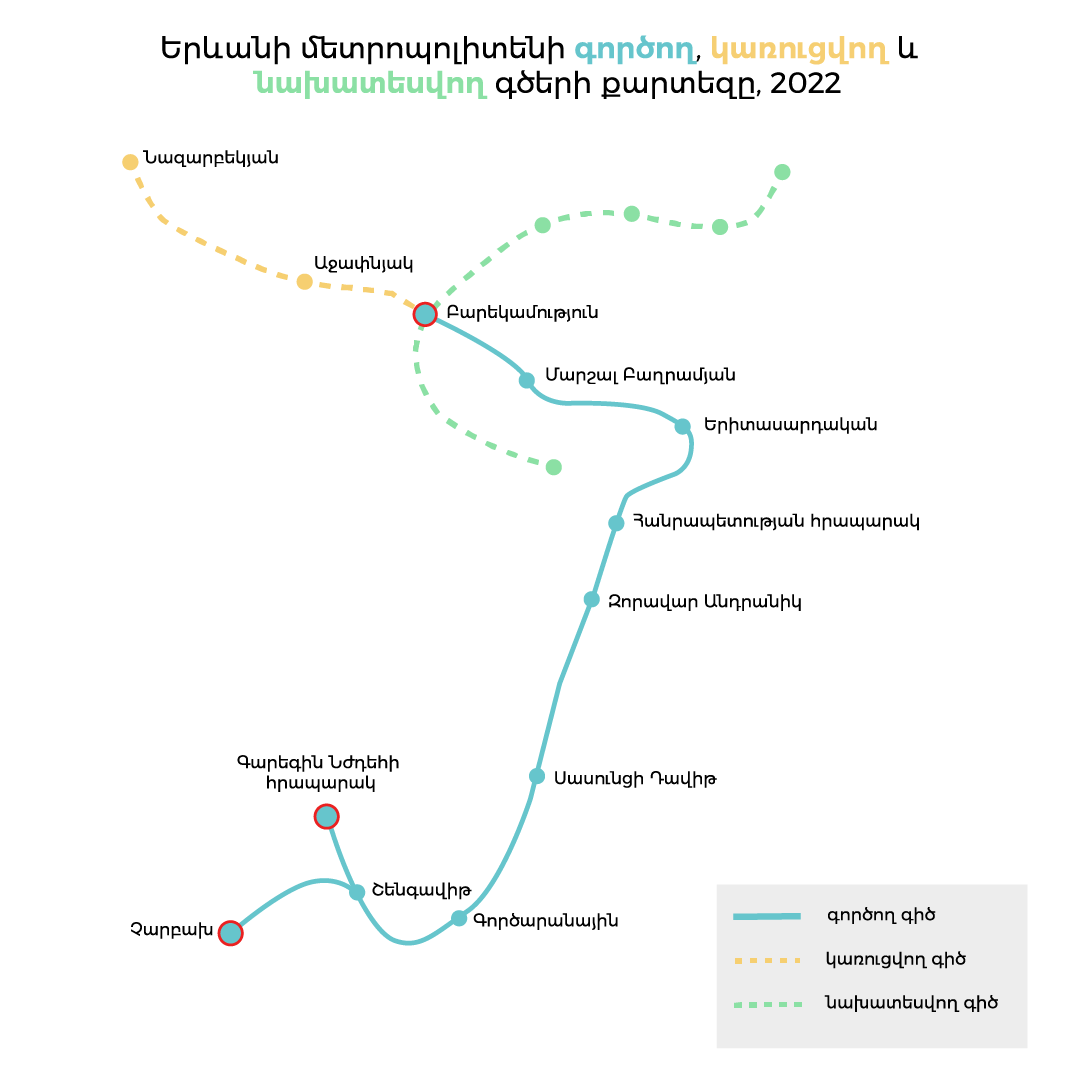
Map of the existing (blue), under construction (yellow), and planned (green) lines of the Yerevan Metro

According to the main development plan for the Yerevan metro, there should be 32 stations and 3 lines. The first line should be extended to Ajapnyak and Davtashen districts. The second one should stretch from the Northern Bus Station through Kanaker-Zeytun, Arabkir, Kentron districts and further to Erebuni district. The third line should connect Avan, Nor-Nork, and Nork-Marash districts with the city centre and continue through the Kilikia neighborhood to Malatia-Sebastia district.

=== Ajapnyak ===
The tunnels leading to the Ajapnyak station were dug during the Soviet years, and an entrance to the station was planned. However, due to the collapse of the USSR and a lack of funds, construction was halted.

The business program being considered by the mayor's office included two components: the construction of a shopping centre near the new metro station and the renovation of the outdated apartment building in the adjacent area.

In June 2014, the results of a feasibility study for the construction of a new 3-kilometre route from the Yerevan metro to Ajapnyak were presented. Commissioned by a European consulting firm in cooperation with the European Bank for Reconstruction and Development, the study was commissioned. The project called for using only one of the previously dug tunnels, from the Mergelyan Institute to the left bank of the Hrazdan River, while a new tunnel was to be dug from the right bank to the National Science Laboratory. These tunnels were to be connected by a bridge.

Construction of the station was previously expected to begin in the spring of 2020. The project cost was not announced.

On August 4, 2020, Yerevan Mayor Hayk Marutyan announced that the station would be built at the state's expense. According to him, the new metro station will cost Yerevan $35 million.

In October 2021, the Russian company Metrogiprotrans won a tender announced by the Yerevan Municipality to design a metro line and station in the Ajapnyak district, including the construction of Armenia's first cable-stayed bridge over the Hrazdan River. The Armenian government was also offered a project for the development of the Yerevan Metro worth approximately $500 million.

In August 2022, Metrogiprotrans presented the results of the first stage of design and estimate documentation and preliminary reports with two design options. According to preliminary estimates, after the preparation of the full version of the project, construction work will last approximately 4 years. The Armenian government allocated 1.1 billion drams to the Ministry of Territorial Administration and Infrastructure to finance preliminary work on the station. Construction of the new station was supposed to begin in 2024, but in December 2024 it was reported that a developer would be selected by the end of 2025, and construction would begin in 2026.

=== Surmalu ===
In June 2024, Yerevan Deputy Mayor Tigran Avinyan announced that design work was underway to construct a ground station, projected to be named "Surmalu," between existing General Andranik - David of Sasun section.

The station's construction will provide additional transportation links to the Surmalu and Petak shopping centres, as well as Komitas Park. According to the designers, the proposed station will have access to Kristapor and Sevan Streets.

=== Nazarbekyan ===
The station is planned to be located in the Ajapnyak district, in the northwestern part of Yerevan. It is planned to be built near the Ararat Golf Club and the upscale Vahagni neighborhood. The station will be named after the Armenian military leader, hero of the Battle of Sardarapat, Lieutenant General Tovmas Nazarbekyan.

The station also has a projected name: “Gevorg Chaush Square”.

=== Davtashen ===
Construction work on the station was scheduled to begin in the late 1980s. However, it was suspended due to the Spitak earthquake and the collapse of the USSR.

The station will be located in the northwest of Yerevan, in the Davtashen district.

=== Zvartnots Airport ===
In 2011, the Ministry of Transport and Communications of Armenia, in collaboration with Armenian Railways, developed a project to build a new high-speed rail line that would connect Zvartnots International Airport with the Charbakh metro station in Yerevan and the Karmir Blur railway station. This would integrate Armenia's rail system with the Yerevan Metro. As of early February 2018, the project has been frozen or cancelled.

== Renovation ==
The Yerevan Metro was thoroughly renovated for the first time since its founding, with funds of about $41 million allotted by the European Union. With the assistance of the European Bank for Reconstruction and Development, tunnels were upgraded, metro cars were renovated and new logistical equipment was installed. The renovation was fully finished by 2012, with the drainage system construction concluding in 2021.

== Stations design ==
Each station is decorated with valuable types of granite, marble, tuff, basalt, gabbro, and travertine, brought from many regions of the Soviet Union. Architectural details in the Yerevan Metro reflect a blend of modernist design and national identity through stylized Armenian motifs. Craftsmen from Moscow, Ukraine, Udmurtia, and Buryatia took an active part in the artistic decoration and design of the stations.

== See also ==
- List of metro systems
- Transport in Armenia
- Trolleybuses in Yerevan
