= Pambak, Lori =

Pambak Փամբակ
- Location within Armenia
- Coordinates: 40°50′10″N 44°33′22″E
- Country: Armenia
- Marz (Province): Lori
- Elevation: 1,200 m (3,900 ft)

Population (2011)
  - Total: 341
- Time zone: UTC+4 ( )

Pambak (Armenian: Փամբակ) is a village in the Lori Region of Armenia.

Pambak is a village in Lori with under 100 households. There is a primary school located outside the residential area and across the main road connecting Vanadzor to Alaverdi.
