= Barekamutyun (Yerevan Metro) =

Yerevan Metro Station

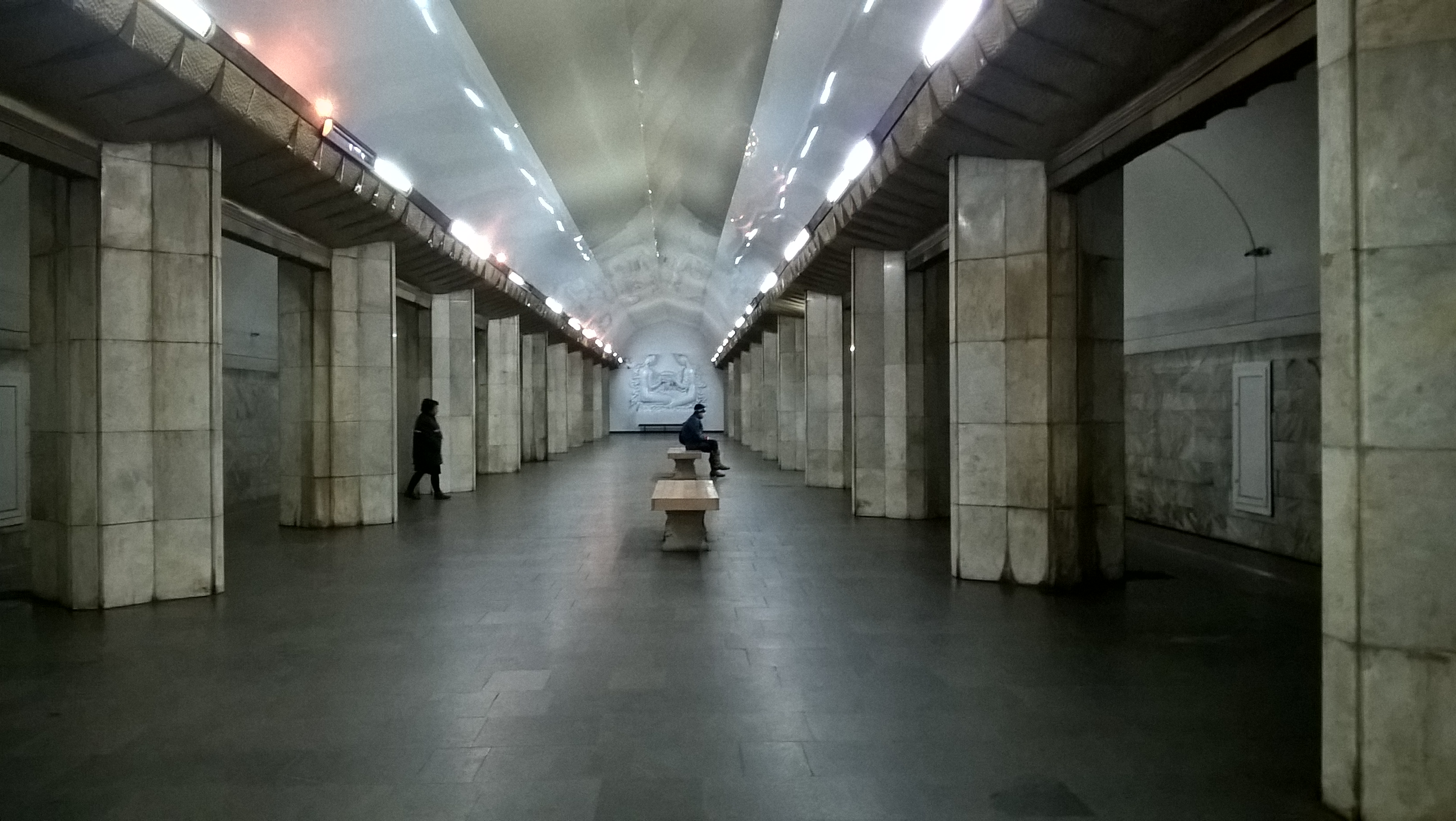

General information
- Coordinates: 40°11′53″N 44°29′34″E
- System: Yerevan Metro station
- Operator: Yerevan Metro
- Platforms: 1
- Tracks: 2

Other information
- Website: yermetro.am/stations/barekamutiun/

History
- Opened: 7 March 1981

Services
Preceding station	Yerevan Metro	Following station
Terminus	Karen Demirchyan Yerevan Subway	Marshal Baghramyan towards Charbakh or Garegin Nzhdeh Square
Location

Barekamutyun (Armenian: Բարեկամություն, English: Friendship) is one of the two terminal stations of the Yerevan Metro, opened on 7 March 1981. The station is located in the center of Yerevan, in the Arabkir District, with access to Marshal Baghramyan Avenue, Kievyan, Hrachia Kochar, Kalents, and Vazgen I Streets.

== Station design ==
The vestibule floor is paved with light-colored granite from Pambak (Armenia) and Khujand (Tajikistan), the walls are lined with red Armavir tuff, and the ceiling is made of 30x30 cm tiles made of sound-insulating material called sakmidran.

The width of the station hall is 14–19 meters, and the length is 100 meters. In the central part of the station, divided into three parts by block ceilings, there is a bas-relief by sculptor Ghukas Chubaryan. On both sides of the granite floor is a polished black basalt layer 115 meters long and 20 cm wide, which prevents passengers from slipping when boarding and disembarking the train. The hall walls are lined with light-colored Aghveran marble.
