= Charbakh (Yerevan Metro) =

Yerevan Metro Station

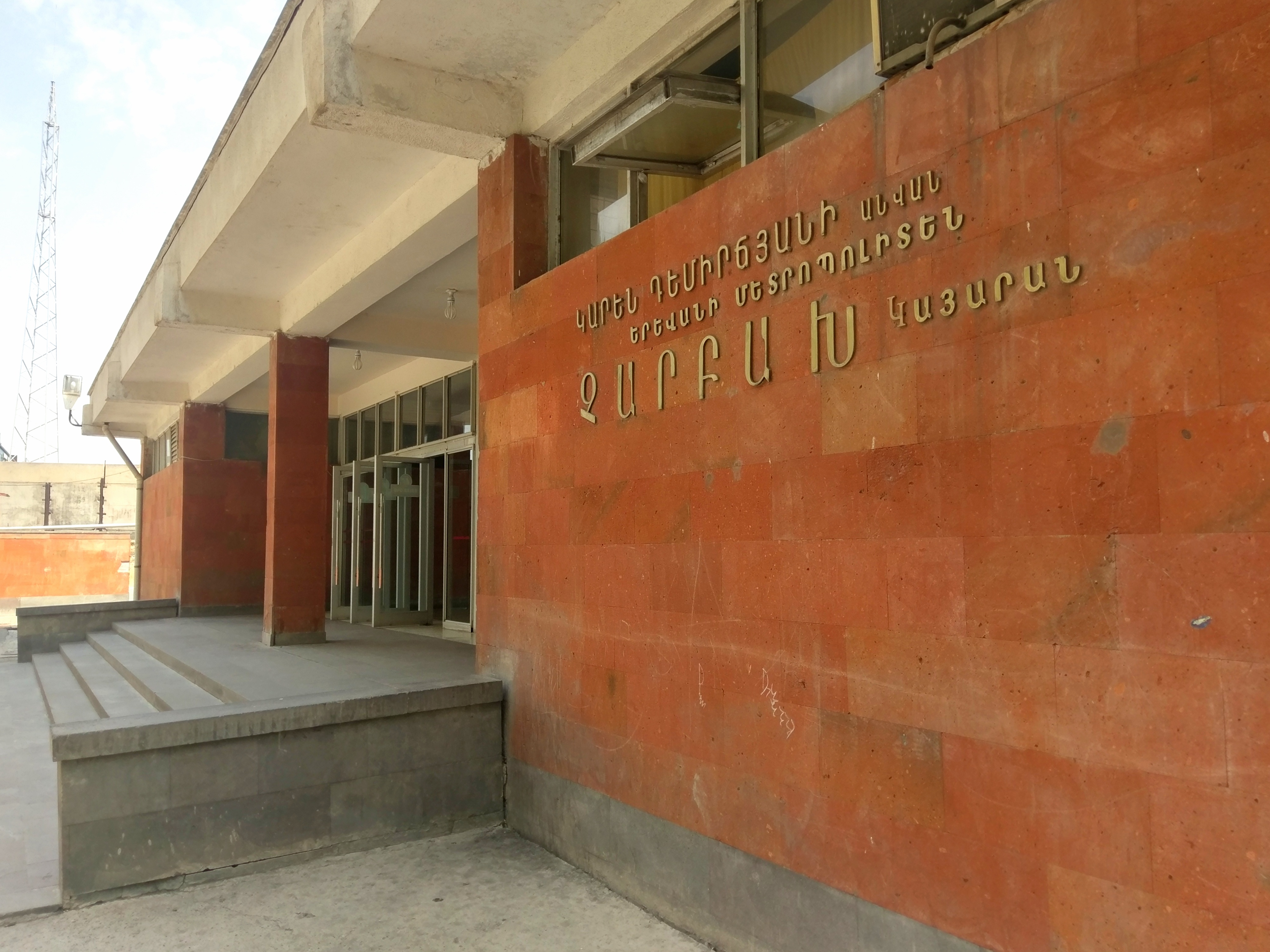

General information
- Location: Shengavit District; Yerevan; Armenia
- Coordinates: 40°08′26″N 44°28′15″E
- System: Yerevan Metro station
- Operator: Yerevan Metro
- Line: 1
- Platforms: 1
- Tracks: 1

Construction
- Structure type: At-grade
- Architect: Valter Mnatsakanyan

History
- Opened: December 26, 1996

Services
Preceding station	Yerevan Metro	Following station
Shengavit towards Barekamutyun	Karen Demirchyan Yerevan Subway	Terminus
Location

Charbakh (Armenian: Չարբախ) is a Yerevan Metro station, which opened on December 26, 1996. It is in the Shengavit District and has access to Shirak and Araratyan streets.

It is the only station constructed after Armenia gained independence from the Soviet Union, and the least expensive ever built.

== Station design ==
The station's architectural design was developed by Valter Mnatsakanyan.

Due to its status as the least expensive metro station constructed, the design was kept as simple and functional as possible. It is constructed from orange-colored tuff and features a flat concrete roof painted white. The metal roof is supported by metal cylindrical columns, on which spherical light fittings were originally installed (removed in 2016). The station's vestibule is square and divided into two parts to separate incoming and outgoing passengers.
