= Garegin Nzhdeh Square (Yerevan Metro) =

Yerevan Metro Station

Coordinates: 40.1510°N 44.4835°E

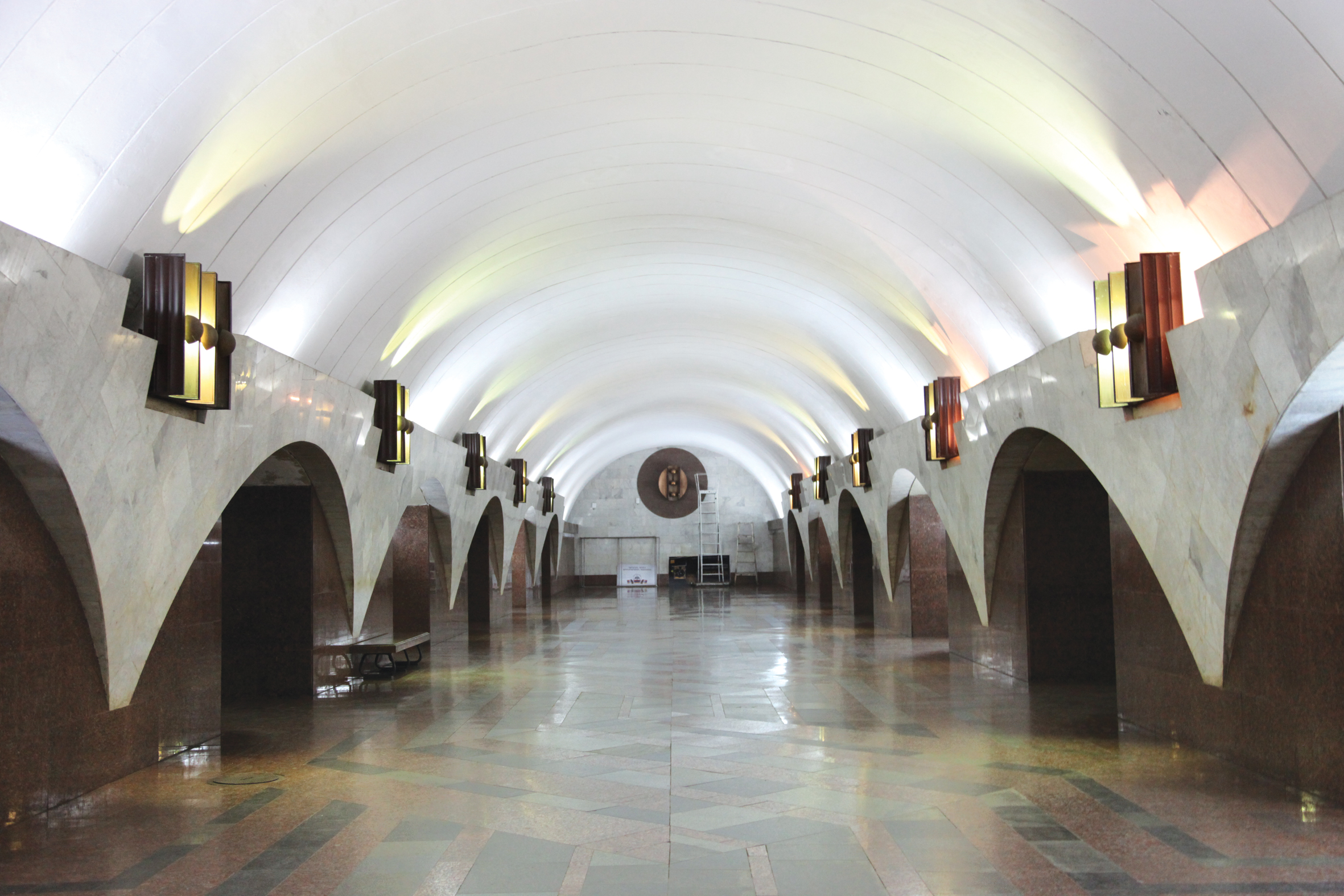
- Inside the station

General information
- System: Yerevan Metro station
- Operator: Yerevan Metro
- Platforms: 1
- Tracks: 2

Construction
- Structure type: Underground

History
- Opened: January 4, 1987
- Former names: Spandaryan Square

Services
Preceding station	Yerevan Metro	Following station
Shengavit towards Barekamutyun	Karen Demirchyan Yerevan Subway	Terminus
Location

Garegin Nzhdeh Square (Armenian: Գարեգին Նժդեհի Հրապարակ) is a Yerevan Metro station, opened on December 31, 1986. It is located in the Shengavit District and has exits to Garegin Nzhdeh Square, Garegin Nzhdeh Street, and Bagratunyats Avenue.

Until 1992, it was called "Spandaryan Square" after the Soviet revolutionary Suren Spandaryan, then it was renamed in honor of Garegin Nzhdeh, an Armenian statesman and military commander.

== Station design ==
The architect of the station is the Honored Architect of the Armenian SSR Levon Gevorgyan, and the main designer is Ilya Manucharyan.

The station features arched passages between the pylons, leading to the side halls from the central one. The pylons themselves are faced with dark brown granite]and decorated with portraits of historical Armenian figures, including Garegin Nzhdeh himself.

== Gallery ==
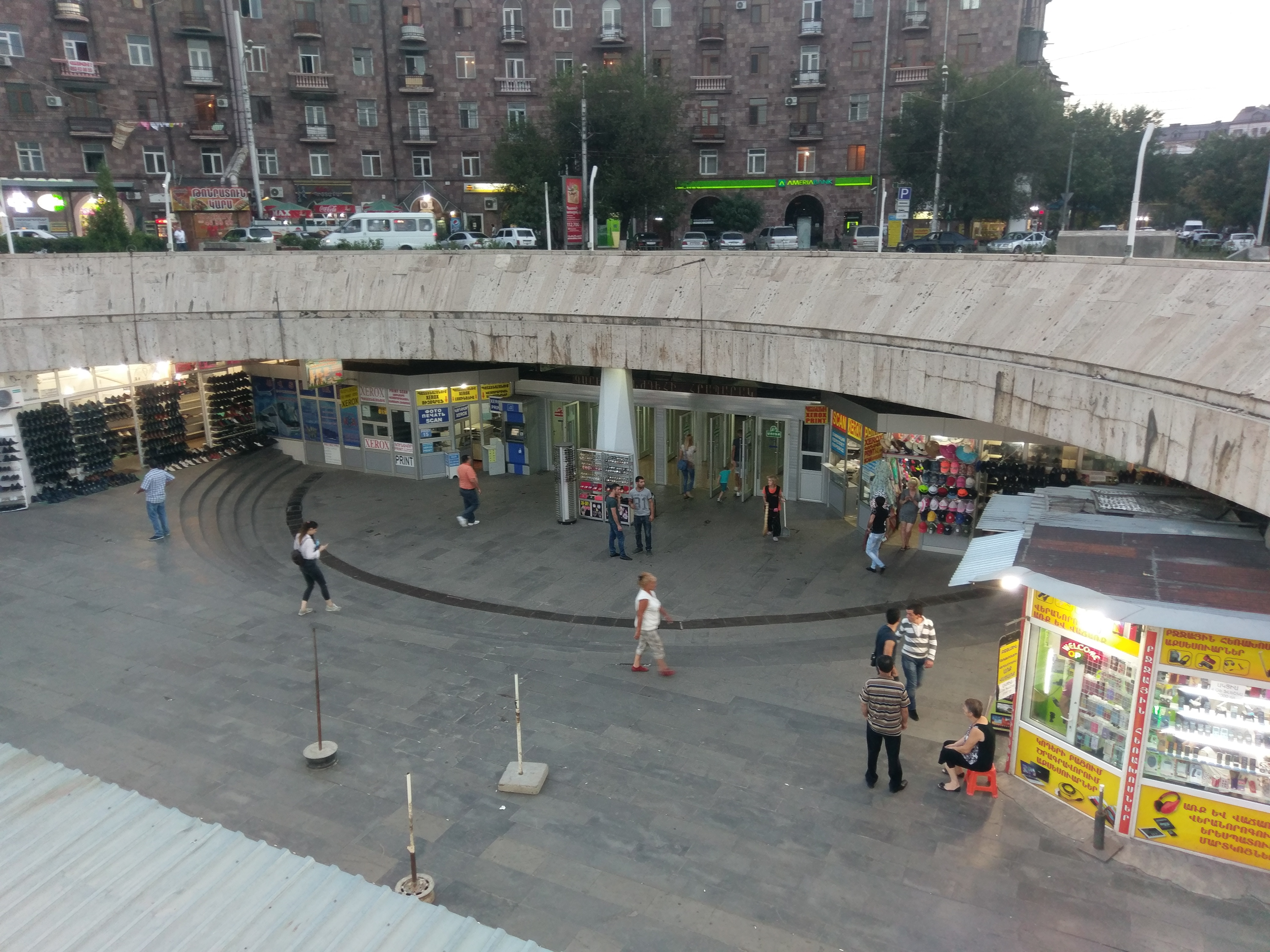
Entrance to the station

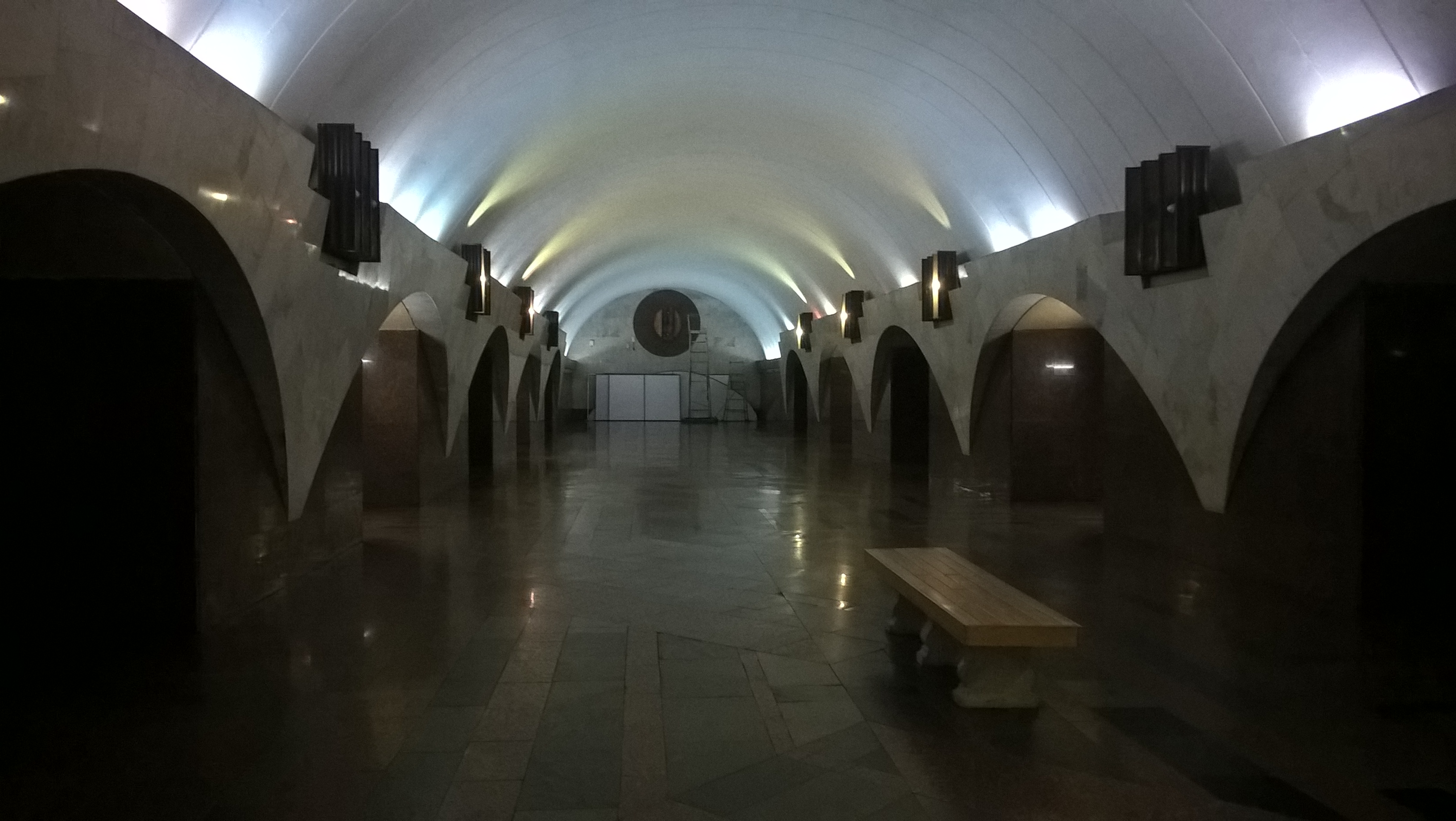
Inside the station
