= List of sports venues in Yerevan =

Yerevan is the capital and the largest city of Armenia and home to most of the sports venues within the republic.

== Association football ==
=== Stadiums ===
Yerevan is home to many stadiums that regularly host the Armenian Premier League and Armenian First League matches:

#	Image	Stadium	Capacity	Home team(s)	City	Opened	Seats
1		Hrazdan Stadium	54,208	none	Yerevan	1970	all-seater
2		Vazgen Sargsyan Republican Stadium	14,403	Armenia, Ararat Yerevan	Yerevan	1935	all-seater
3		Mika Stadium	7,250	Mika (2008-2016)	Yerevan	2008	all-seater
4		Alashkert Stadium	6,850	Alashkert	Yerevan	1960	1,850 seated
5		Urartu Stadium	4,860	Urartu	Yerevan	2008	all-seater
6		Yerevan Football Academy Stadium	1,428	Pyunik	Yerevan	2013	all-seater
7		Junior Sport Stadium	1,188	FC West Armenia	Yerevan	2021	all-seater
8		Hmayak Khachatryan Stadium	488	Erebuni	Yerevan		all-seater

=== Training centres ===
Currently, Yerevan is home to 4 football training centres/academies:

- Pyunik Training Centre owned by FC Pyunik, located in Kentron District, Yerevan: is home to 3 natural-grass regular-sized pitches as well as the Pyunik Stadium.
- Banants Training Centre owned by FC Banants, located in Malatia-Sebastia District, Yerevan: is home to 2 natural-grass and 1 artificial turf regular-sized pitches as well as the Banants Stadium.
- Technical Center-Academy of the Football Federation of Armenia, located in Avan District, Yerevan: is home to 8 natural-grass and 2 artificial turf regular-sized pitches as well as the main stadium.

== Other sports ==
=== Indoor sports ===
- Karen Demirchyan Complex
- Mika Sports Arena
- Dinamo Sports Arena

=== Tennis ===
- Incourt Tennis Club
- Ararat Tennis Club

=== Other ===
- Tigran Petrosian Chess House
- Hovik Hayrapetyan Equestrian Centre
- Mirage Equestrian Centre
- Yerevan Velodrome
- Yerevan Figure Skating and Hockey Sports School
- Ararat Valley Golf Club
- Arena Bowling and Billiards Club
- Olympavan Olympic Training Complex
- Yerevan State Sports College of Olympic Reserve
- Armenia Sports Union
