= Hripsime School for Girls (Yerevan) =

Coordinates: 40°10′47″N 44°30′36″E

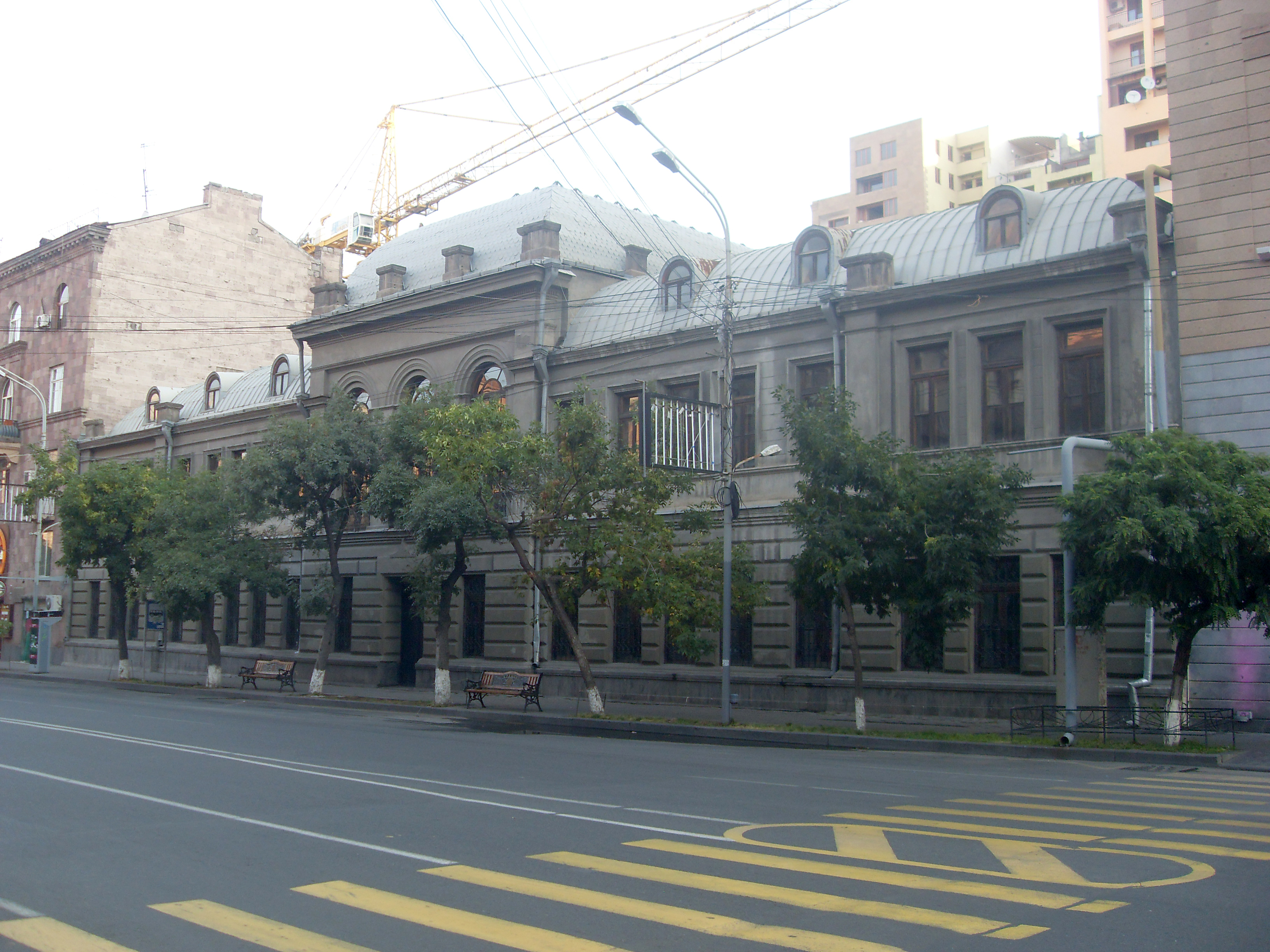
The building of Hripsime School for Girls in 2015

Hripsime School for Girls (Armenian: Հռիփսիմյան օրիորդաց դպրոց) or Hripsimian Women's Gymnasium, was an all-female gymnasium founded in 1850 in Yerevan, then part of the Erivan Governorate of the Russian Empire. Located on Amiryan Street, the building of the gymnasium is intact and included in the list of immovable historical and cultural monuments of the Kentron District of Yerevan, the capital of Armenia.

== History ==
The school was founded in 1850 in Yerevan by means of the Yerevan Department of the Women's Charity Society after Saint Nina. Initially called the Hripsime Girl's College, in 1884 it became the Feminized pharmacology, then in 1898 it became the female gymnasium. It has been subordinated to state school authorities and operated by state programs. The training was in Russian. They taught Armenian, Russian, Persian, Mathematics, Geography and Handicraft. In 1866, a preparatory class was opened with the following new subjects: biology, botany, general education along with Russian history, French, aesthetics, painting, music and more. In 1904, the eighth additional classroom was opened in the departments of the Russian language and mathematics. In 1917, 526 pupils studied at the Hripsime female gymnasium, of which 352 were Armenians. In 1918, the school for girls became nationalized and the teaching of Armenian was emphasized. In 1921 it was turned into a second-grade gymnastic school, and named after Alexander Miasnikian later in 1925.

== The building ==
The building of Hripsime School for Girls is included in the list of immovable monuments of history and culture of the Kentron District as a historical and cultural monument of republican significance. It was built in 1898 and the project was created by Architect Ivan Vagapov. The building has been reconstructed by the design of Vasily Mirzoyan in 1905. The third floor is added on the yard, and on the right is a two-story new building with a basement and a horse-rink. That segment is still standing today. The Armenian Ministry of Care and Labor has been operating in this building from 1918-1920. There is information that the Bryusov Institute was founded in this building. Later, various state institutions were deployed here. In 1982, the building was renovated to move the Yerevan History Museum to the Blue Mosque. The renovation of the building lasted more than a decade. When the museum moved here in 1994, the renovation had not been completed, the exhibition halls were not built, so the Yerevan History Museum had not organized any exhibitions. In 1997, the museum moved from this building and the building was privatized. In 1997, when it became clear that the building would be sold and the Yerevan History Museum would move to another building, the museum began to fight to stay in that building. Many citizens and political and public figures have organized protests and pickets. Finally, the Yerevan History Museum moved from the Amiryan 28/6 building to the Stephan Shahumyan main school.

== Current status of the building ==
In 1996, the building was bought by a British-Armenian businessman, Vache Manukyan. In the same year, he also bought the Sevan hotel and pledged to rebuild it for five years, but eventually refused to leave the building.

From 1996 to 1997, when the Yerevan History Museum was moved from the building, it did not serve any purpose and was not used. To this day, the doors of the building are closed and the backyard of the building has been blocked because of the construction of a multi-storey building.

In 1996, when Vache Manukyan purchased the gymnasium building, it was still not included in the list of immortal historical and cultural monuments as a protected monument. Consequently, a consignment agreement has not been signed with the buyer. The building was included in the list of preserved monuments only in 2004. Since that time the contract of sale has not changed and the building maintenance contract has not been concluded.

== Gallery ==
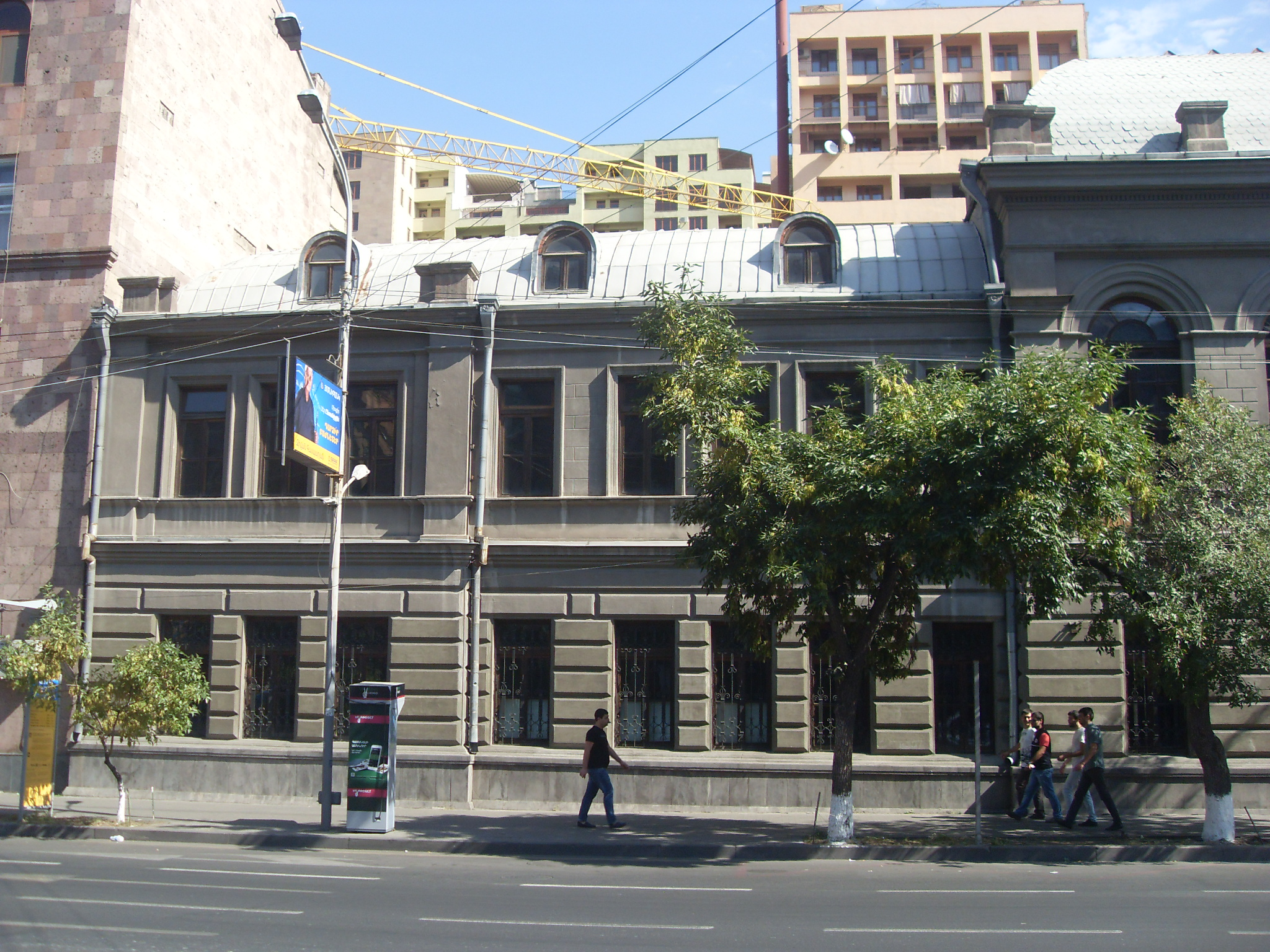

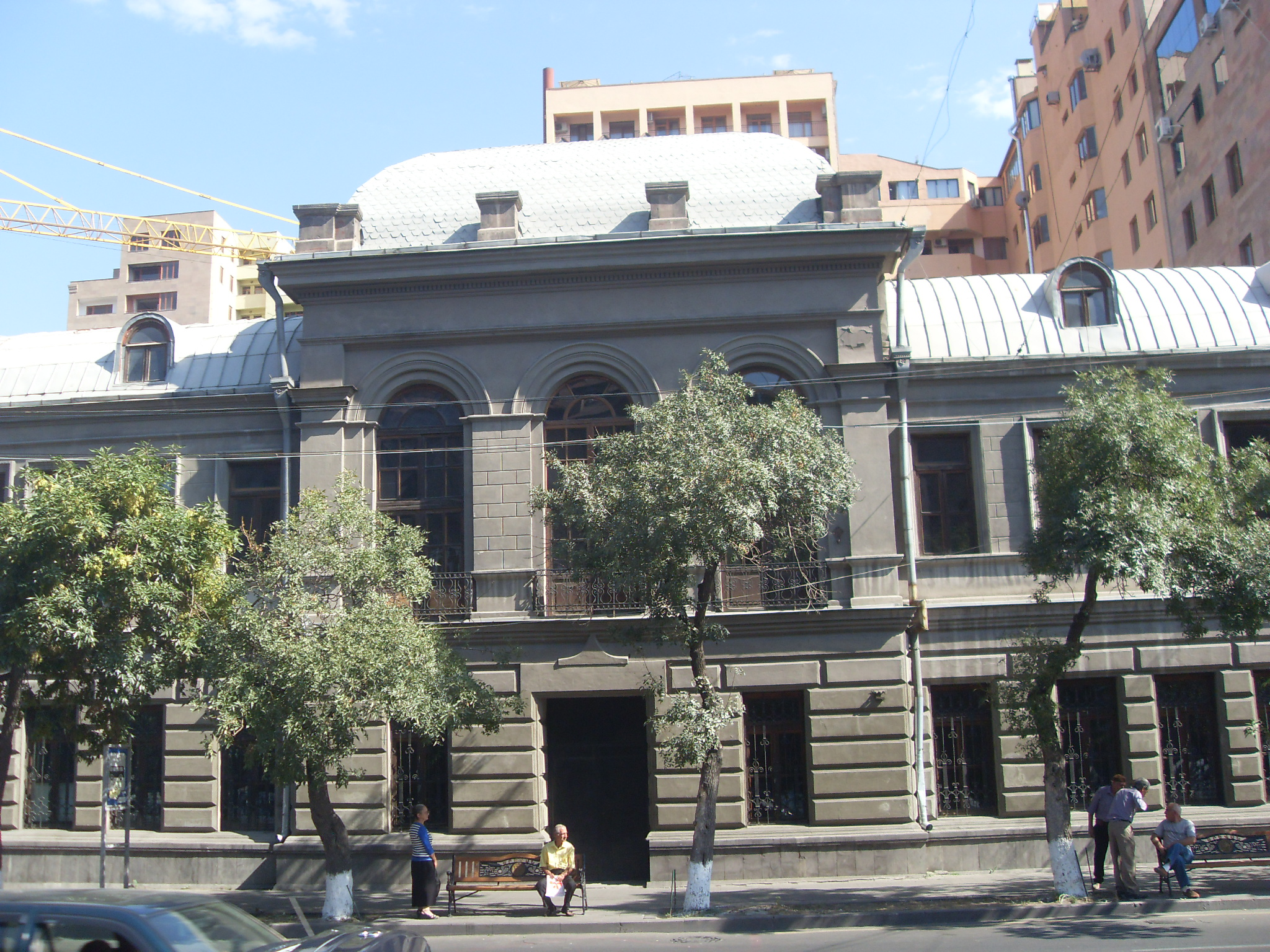

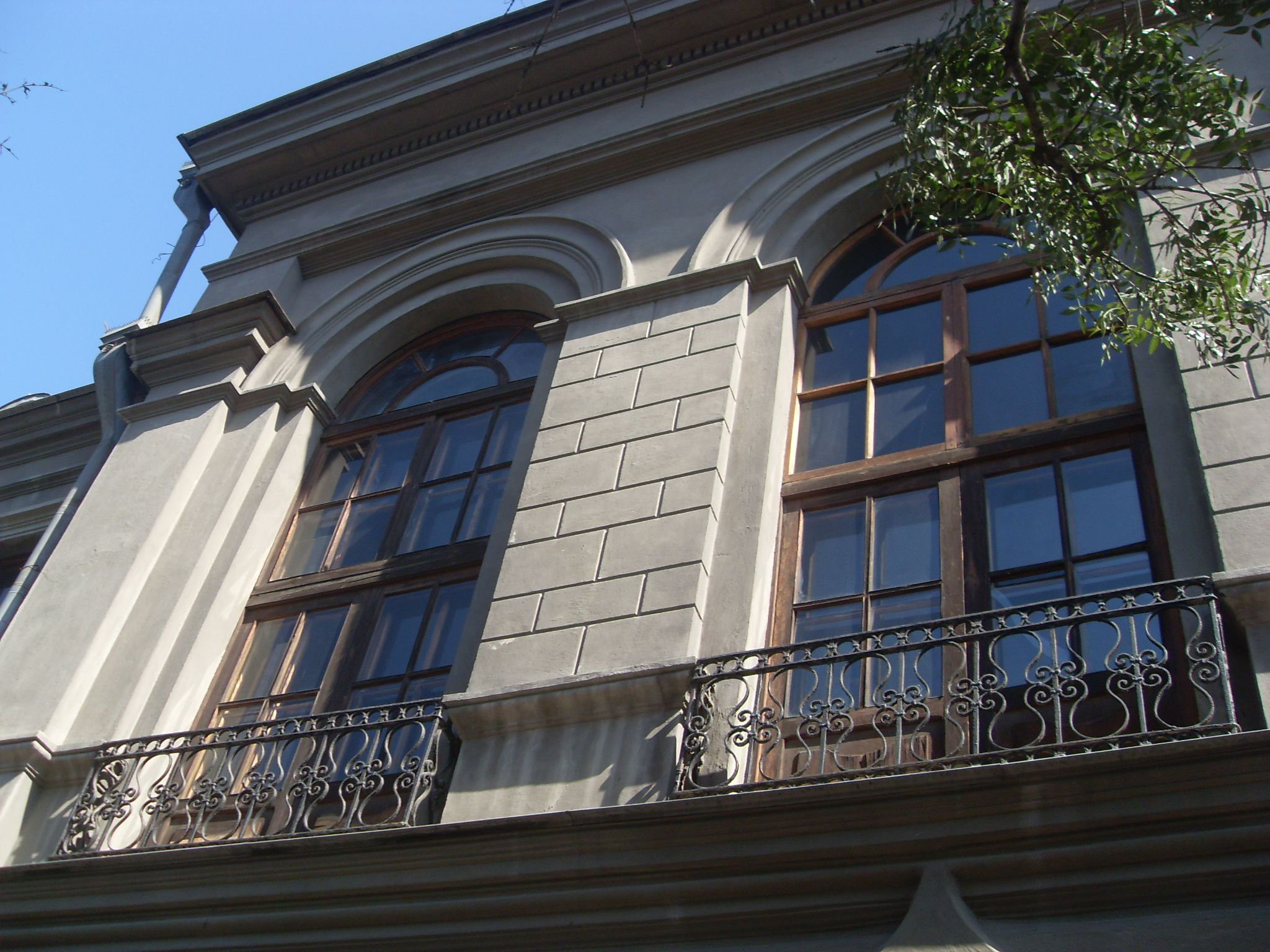

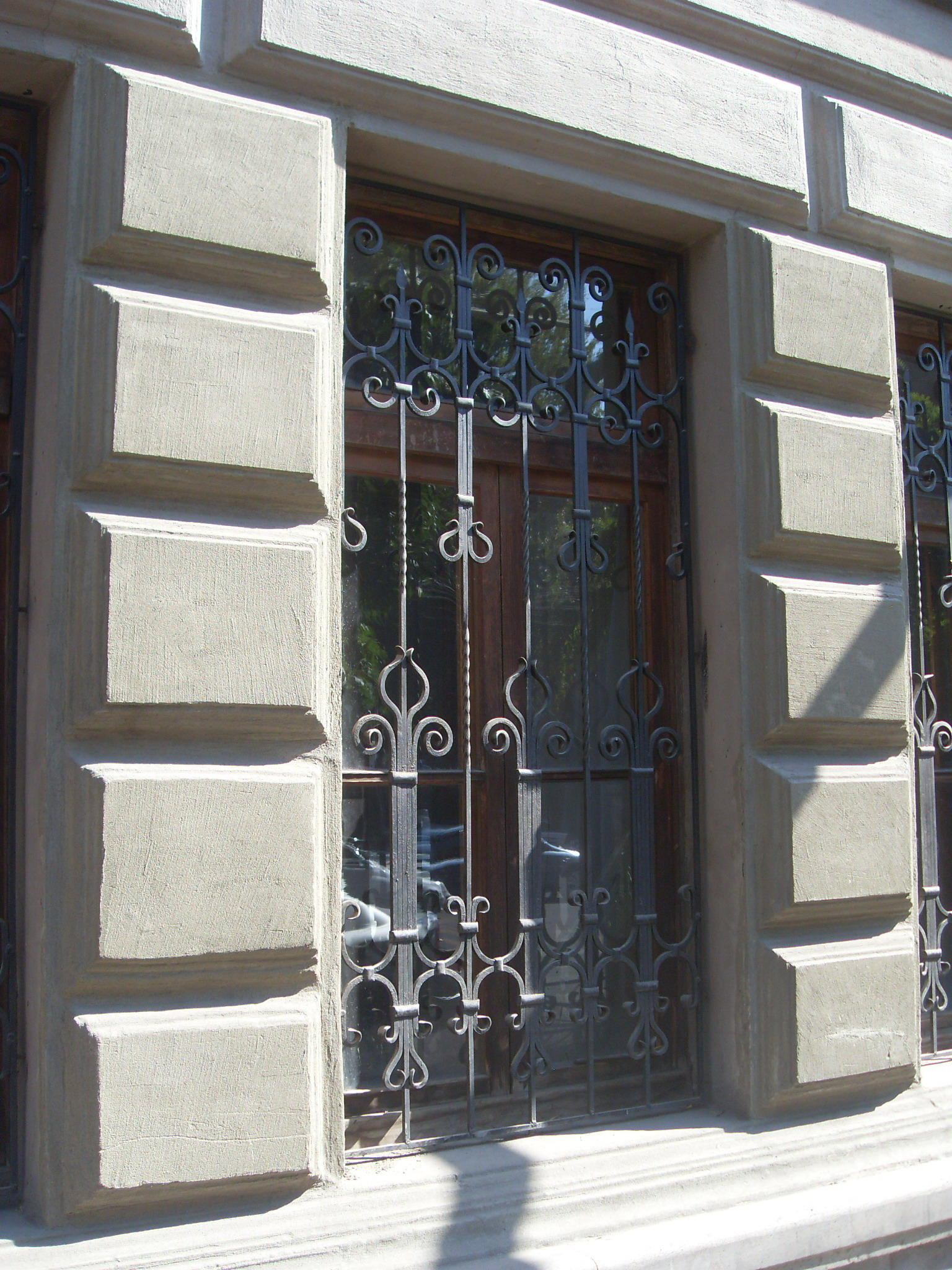

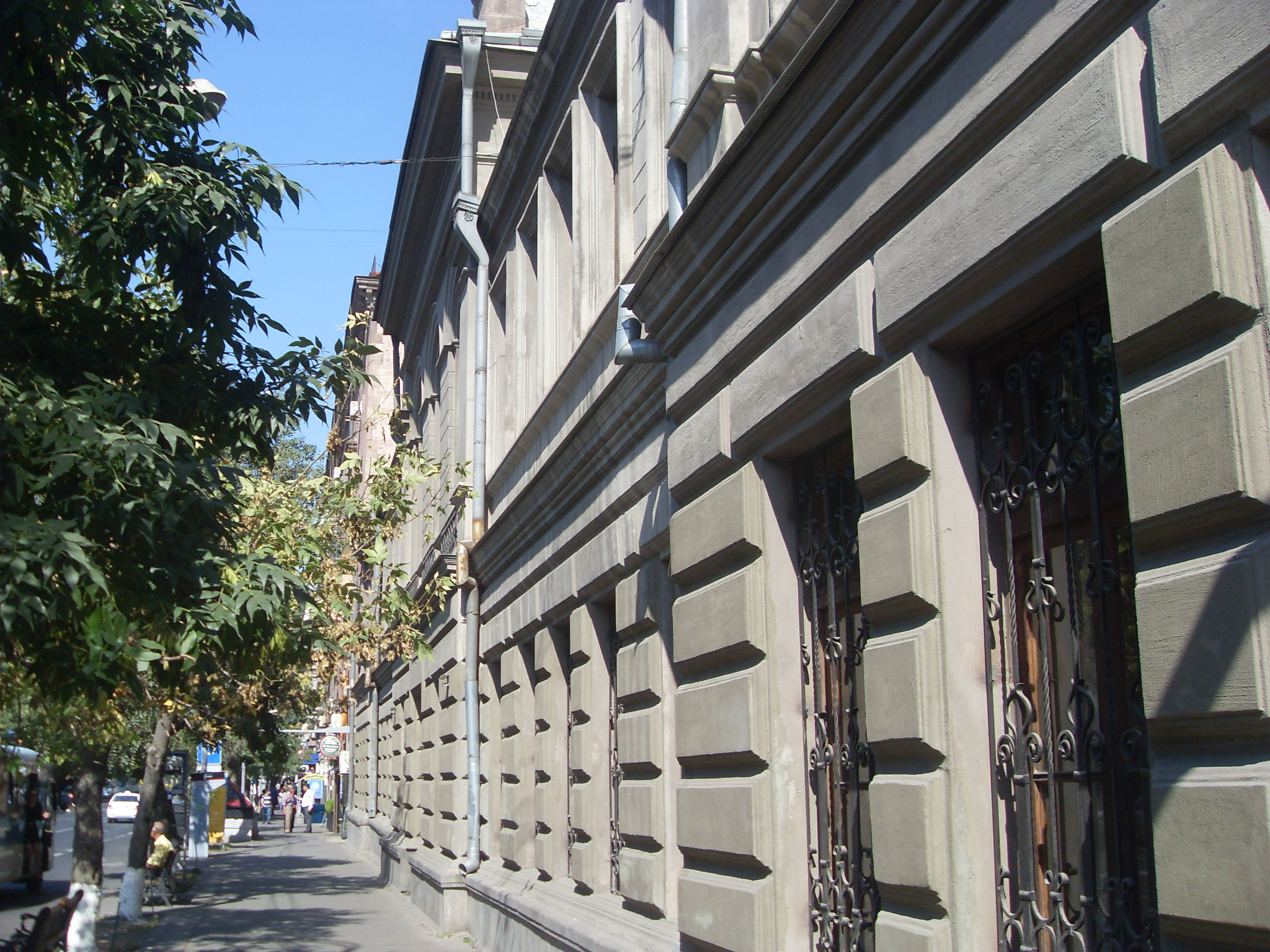

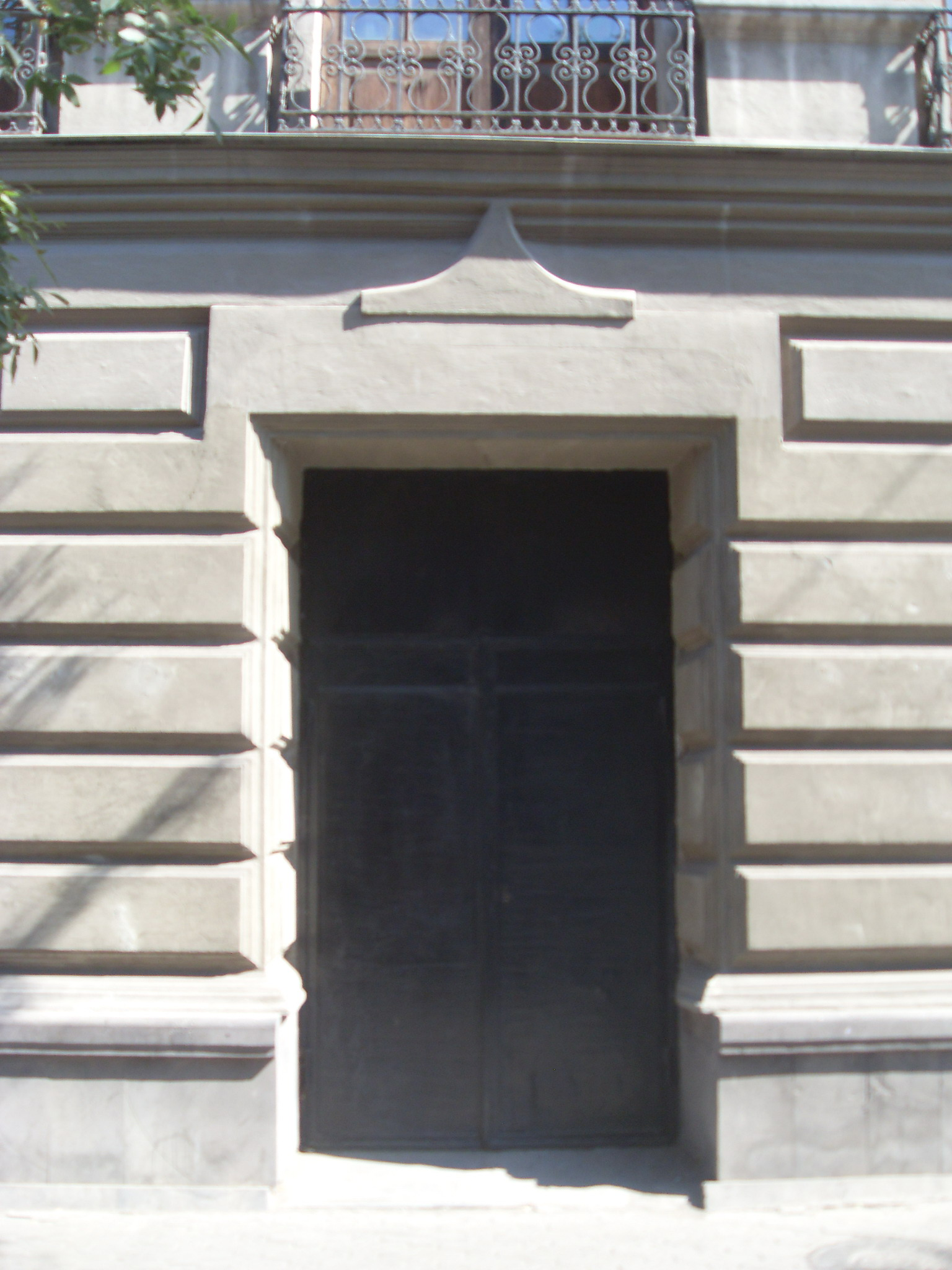

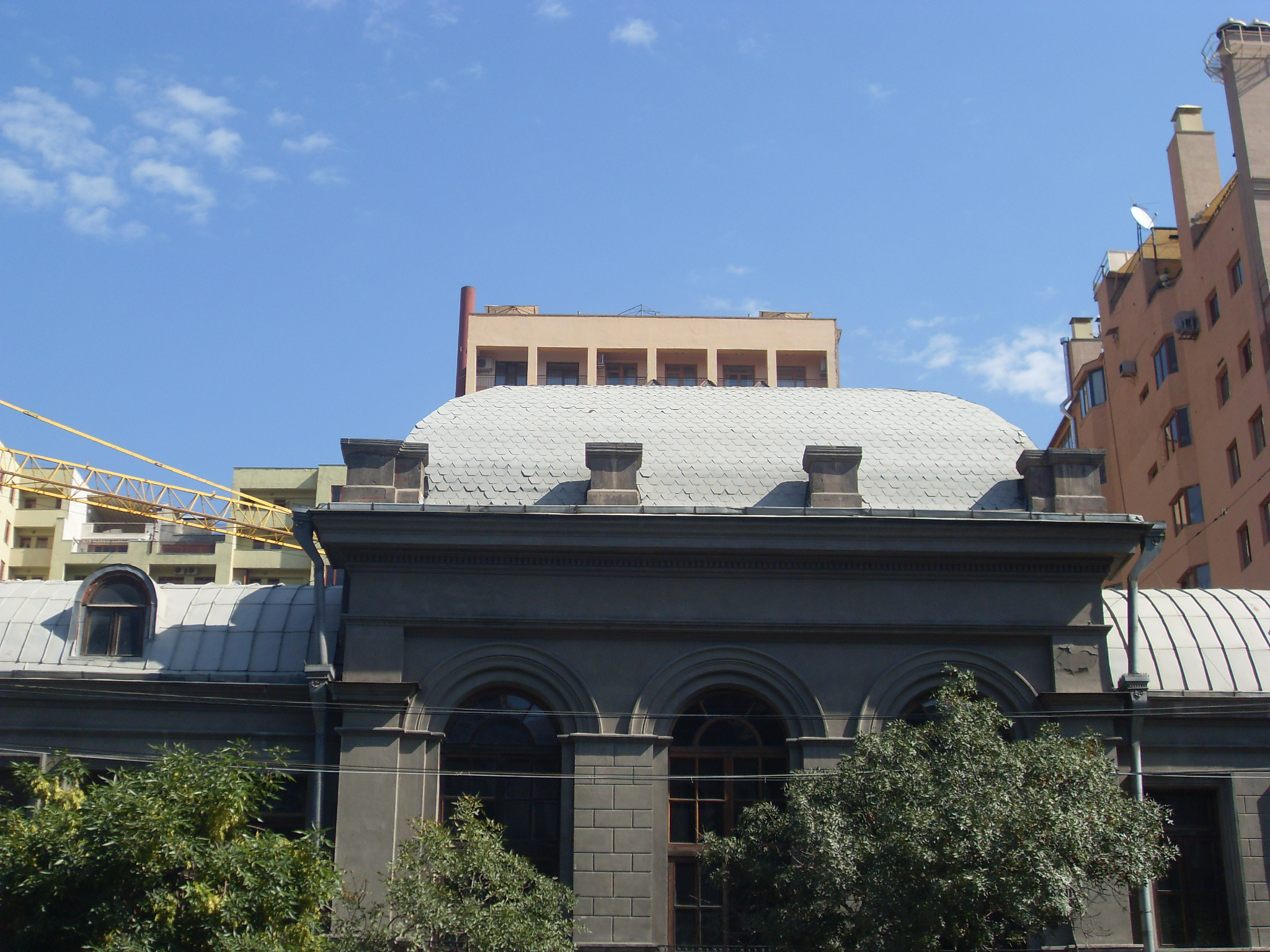
