= Noragyugh =

- Location within Armenia
- Coordinates: 40°10′04″N 44°29′36″E
- Country: Armenia
- Marz (Province): Yerevan
- District: Kentron
- Time zone: UTC+4 ( )

Noragyugh (Armenian: Նորագյուղ) is a historic neighbourhood in the Kentron District of Yerevan, Armenia. A proposal is in place to destroy the historic district and turn it into a business and residential district of tower blocks including 70-story skyscrapers, known as "New Yerevan". The plan was approved by the Armenian Government on January 29th 2026.
