= Aram Street =

Street in Yerevan, Armenia

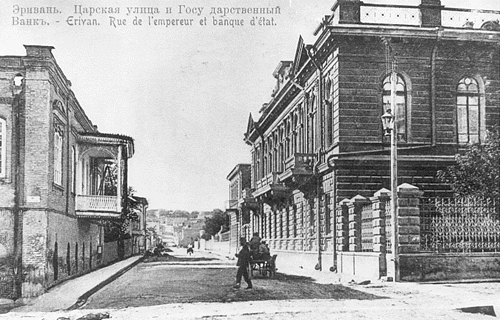
- Aram Street in the 1920s
- Interactive map of Aram Street
- Native name: Արամի Փողոց (Armenian)
- Former names: Tsarskaya Street (1837-1919); Aram Manukian Street (1919-1921); Spandaryan Street (1921-1991)
- Length: 1.2 km (0.75 mi)
- Width: 10 metres
- Location: Kentron district Yerevan, Armenia

Construction
- Inauguration: 1837

Aram Street (Armenian: Արամի Փողոց), is a street at the central Kentron district of the Armenian capital Yerevan, named after Aram Manukian; the leader of the Van Resistance of 1915 and one of the founders of the First Republic of Armenia. It is one of the oldest streets in modern Yerevan.

The street runs from the Khanjyan street at the southeast, to Mashtots Avenue at the northwest, along the Yerevan Vernissage market, the National Gallery of Armenia and Missak Manouchian park.

== History ==
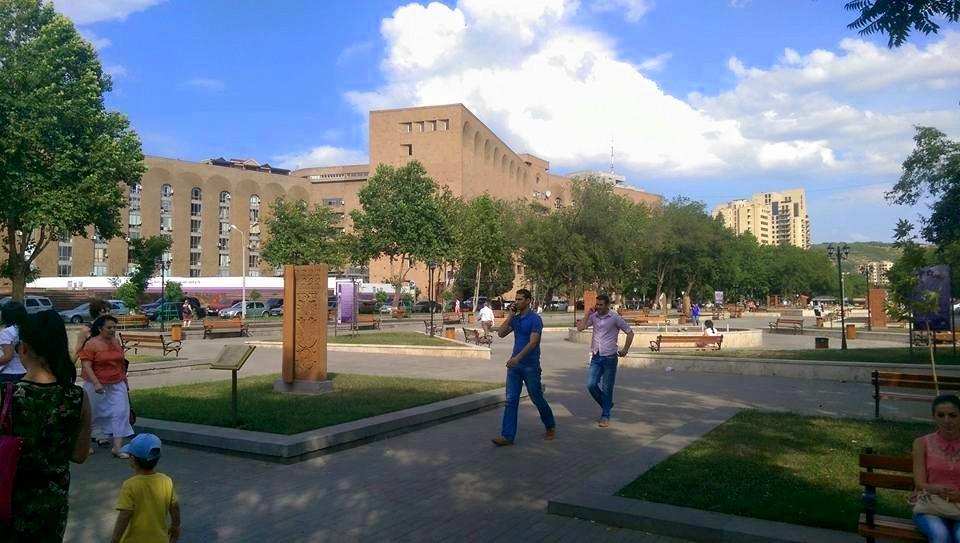
View from the street

The street was opened in 1837 and named Tsarskaya Street in the honour of Tsar Nicholas I who visited the city during that period. In 1919, after the death of the first interior minister of the First Republic of Armenia Aram Manukian, the street was officially renamed after him. After the sovietization of Armenia, the communists renamed the street after the bolshevik activist Suren Spandaryan in 1921. With the independence of Armenia in 1991, the name of Aram Manukian was restored and the street was officially renamed as Aram Street (in Armenian: Arami Poghots).

Between 1917 and 1919, Aram Manukian lived in the building located at Aram Street 9. The building which belonged to Fadey Kalantaryan, dates back to 1910 and designed by architect Boris Mehrabyan.

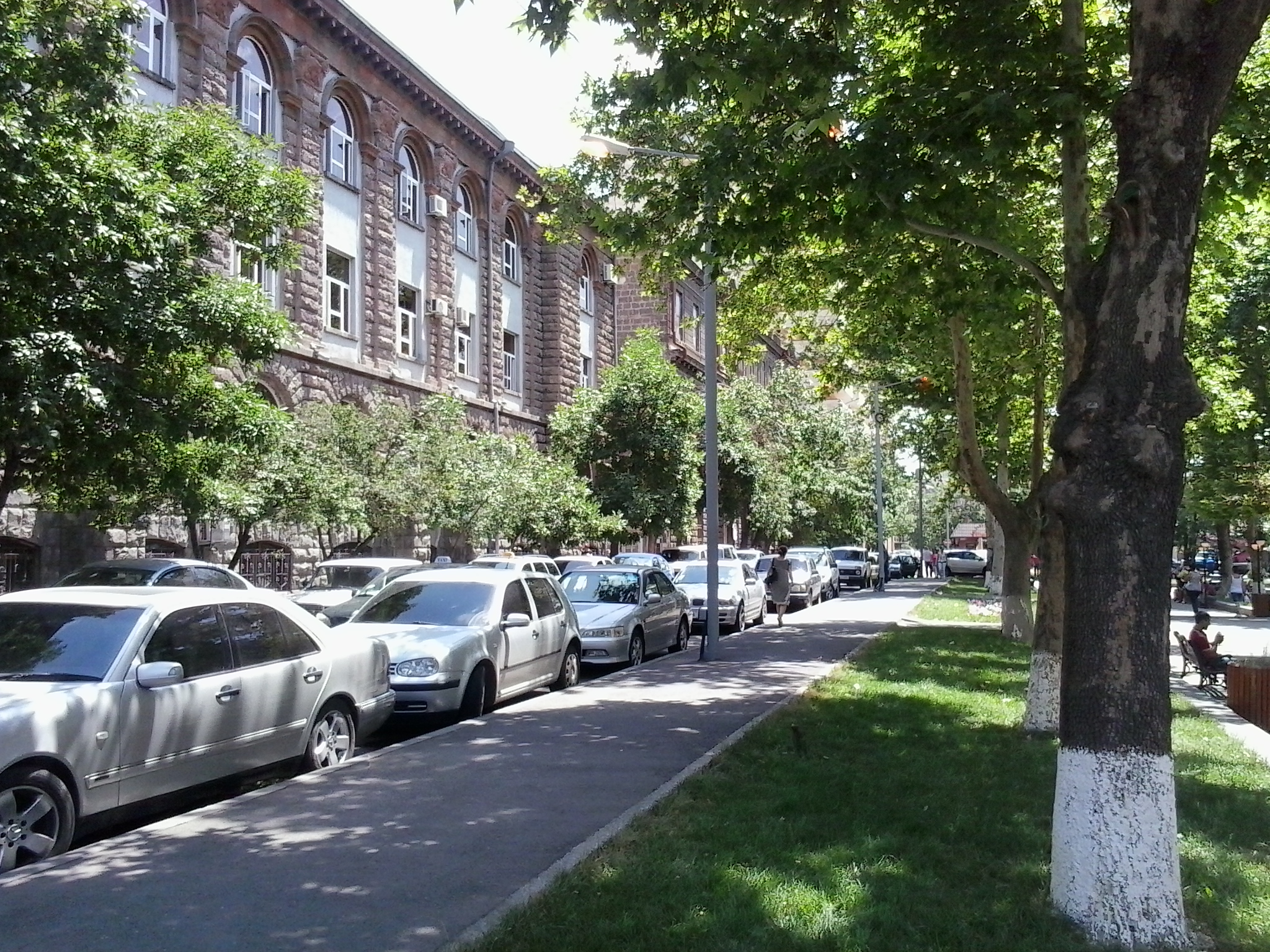
Aram Street in 2014

Aram Street was home to many old and traditional buildings of Yerevan. However, after the independence of Armenia, the majority of the historic buildings on the street were either entirely destroyed or transformed into modern residential buildings through the construction of additional floors. Only few structures were preserved, mainly in the portion that extends from the Abovyan Street to the Mashtots Avenue.

== "Old Yerevan" project ==
In 2005, the Yerevan City Council proposed a plan to restore the old buildings on Aram Street, within the frames of "Old Yerevan" project. The initial plan had suggested to rebuild the historic buildings on the section located between the Abovyan Street and Mashtots park, at a length of 320 meters.

However, the proposed plan was postponed for several years due to lack of financial resources. The budgeted amount for the investment on this project is around US$ 150 million, with a duration of between 3 and 5 years.

In April 2013, the project was revived as the reconstruction process of some old buildings was launched. Based on the revised plan, "Old Yerevan" will be implemented in accordance with the master plan of Yerevan. Thus, the rehabilitated territory will recreate an urban environment that features the historical scene of Yerevan, commercially and culturally integrated into the modern life of the city.
