= Armenia Sports Union =

Sports society in Yerevan, Armenia

Coordinates: 40°10′14″N 44°30′39″E

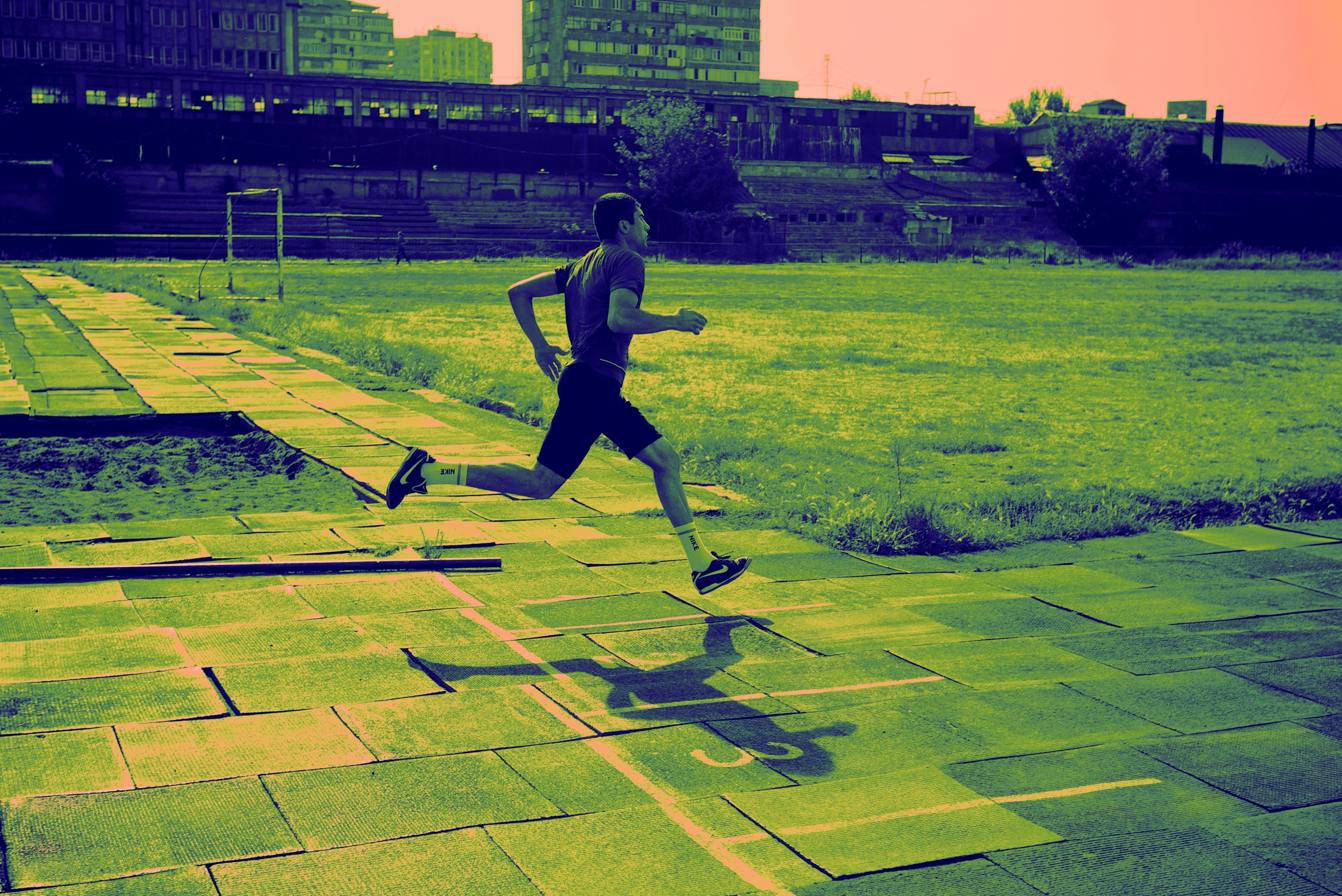
An athlete training at the Armenia Sports Union's Spartak Complex

Armenia Sports Union (Armenian: Հայաստան Մարզական Միություն), formerly known as Spartak Sports Union (Armenian: Սպարտակ Մարզական Միություն) between 1935 and 1999, is a sports society and organization in the city of Yerevan, the capital of Armenia. It is located on Agathangelos Street of the central Kentron District of the city.

== History ==
The Spartak Sports Union was established by the Soviet government in 1935, with the foundation of the Spartak training ground in Yerevan. It was the first football venue in the city and the 2nd-oldest in Armenia after the Gyumri City Stadium.

During the 1930s, the Spartak football ground was used as the home venue of the newly-founded "Spartak Football Club", which later became known as Ararat Yerevan.

During the Soviet years, the complex was supervised by the Yerevan Committee of Physical Culture. However, after the independence of Armenia, the organization was tuned into an NGO social and sports union in 1999 and renamed as "Armenia Sports Union".

The club is mainly involved in individual Olympic sports, including boxing, weightlifting, athletics, wrestling, taekwondo, table tennis, etc. It has an outdoor ground with a football pitch (100 x 65 meters), as well as an indoor training centre. In 2005, the indoor hall was entirely renovated through the efforts of Armenia Fund.
