= Kentron District =

District in Yerevan, Armenia

Kentron Կենտրոն
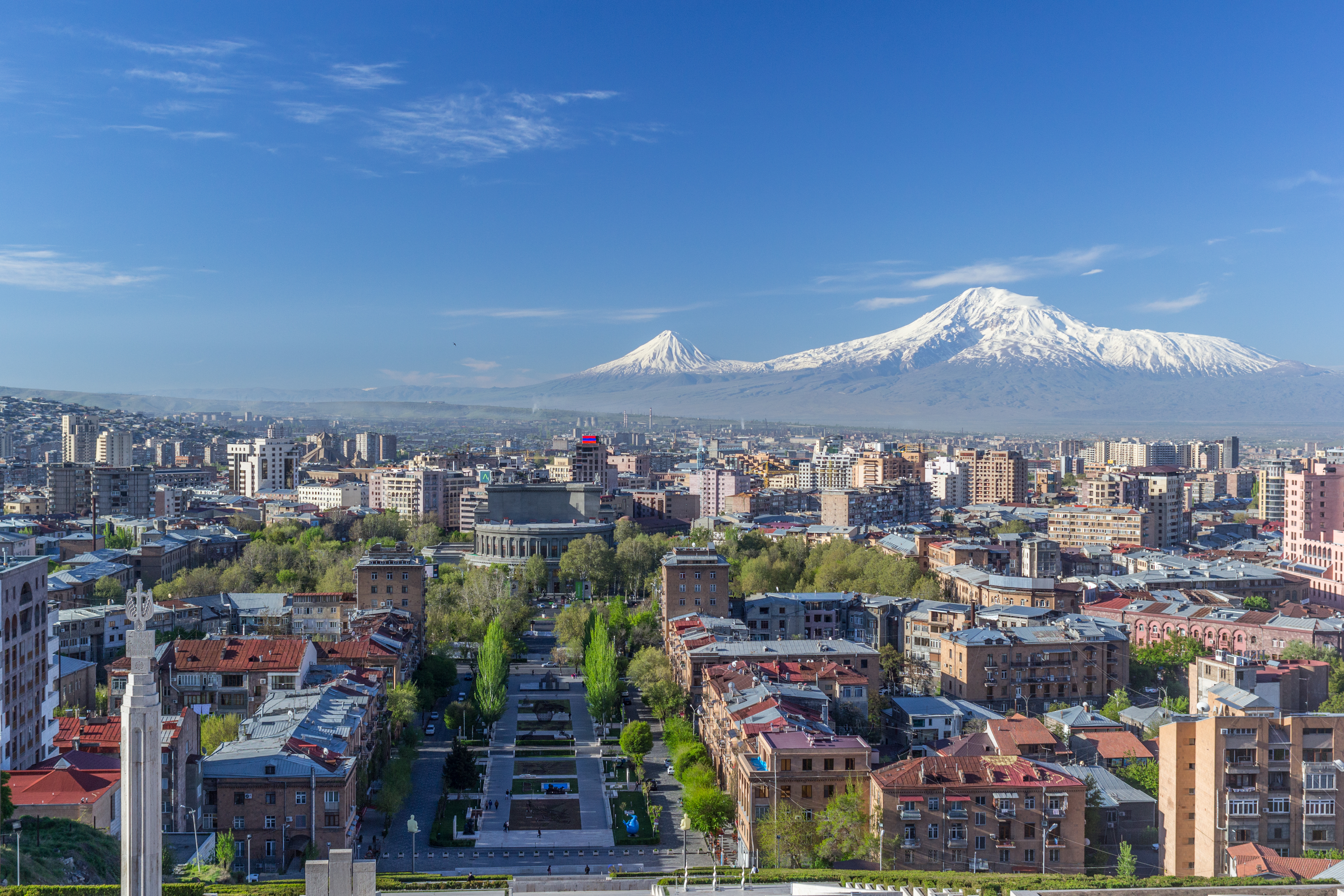
- Kentron District

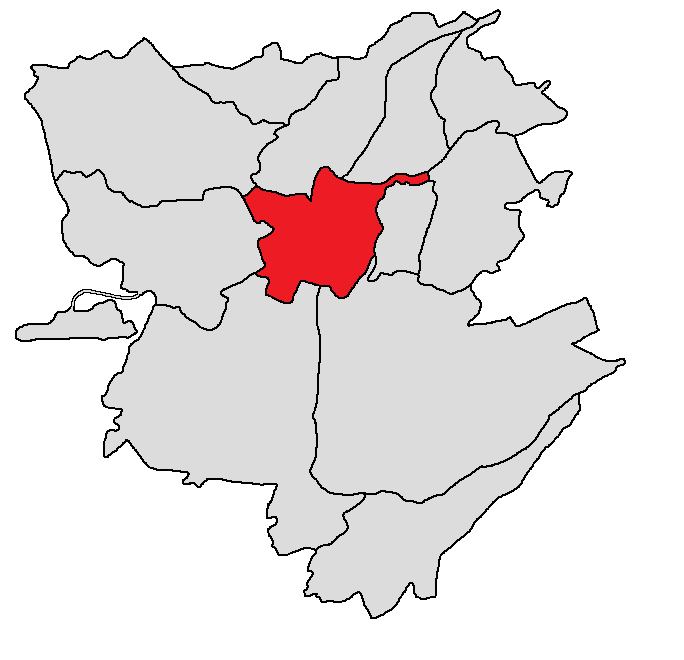
- Kentron district shown in red

- Location within Armenia
- Coordinates: 40°10′41″N 44°30′47″E
- Country: Armenia
- Marz (Province): Yerevan

Area
  - Total: 13.35 km^{2} (5.15 sq mi)
- Elevation: 995 m (3,264 ft)

Population (2022 census)
  - Total: 119,841
  - Density: 8,977/km^{2} (23,250/sq mi)
- Time zone: UTC+4 (AMT)

Kentron (Armenian: Կենտրոն վարչական շրջան, romanized: Kentron varch’akan shrjan), is one of the 12 districts of Yerevan, the capital of Armenia. It comprises the downtown, the commercial centre of the city. As of the 2022 census, the district has a population of 119,841.

Kentron is bordered by Ajapnyak and Malatia-Sebastia districts from the west, Shengavit and Erebuni districts from the south, Nor Nork District from the east and Arabkir and Kanaker-Zeytun districts from the north. Hrazdan River flows through the western part of the district.

== Etymology ==
The word kentron literally means "centre" in Armenian, and has the same etymological root as the English word, ultimately from Ancient Greek κέντρον (kéntron, "centre"). Its Western Armenian cognate is getron (Armenian: կեդրոն).

== Overview ==
The district is unofficially divided into smaller neighborhoods such as Kond, Noragyugh, Pokr Kentron, Nor Kilikia, Kozern and Aygestan.

Kond and Noragyugh are among the 7 original neighbourhoods of old Yerevan.

Parks:

- English Park.
- Children's Park
- Abovyan Children's Park and Railway
- Tsitsernakaberd Park
- Circular Park
- Lovers' Park
- Martiros Saryan Park
- Komitas Park
- Shahumyan Park
- Missak Manouchian Park

== History ==
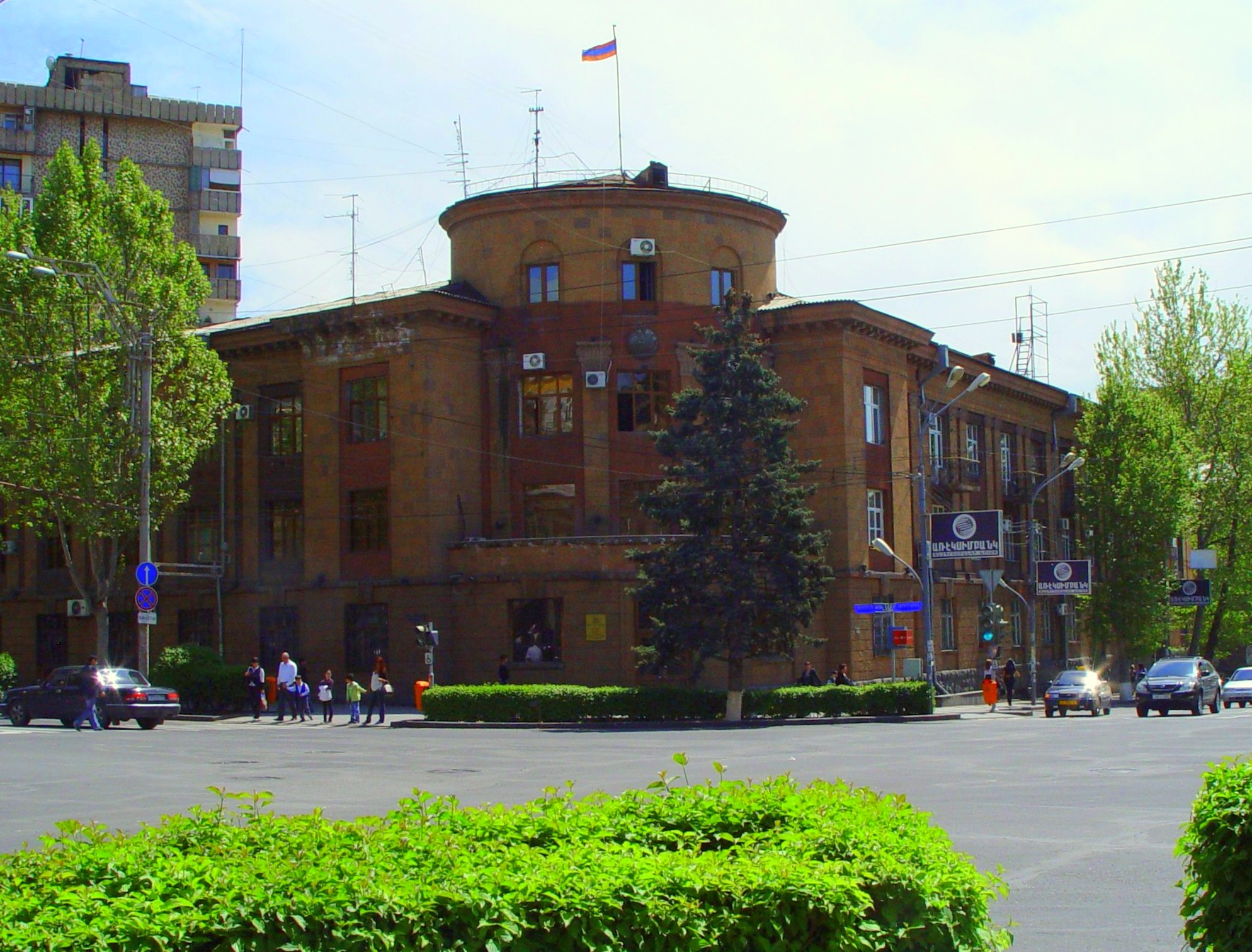
The administrative building of Kentron district

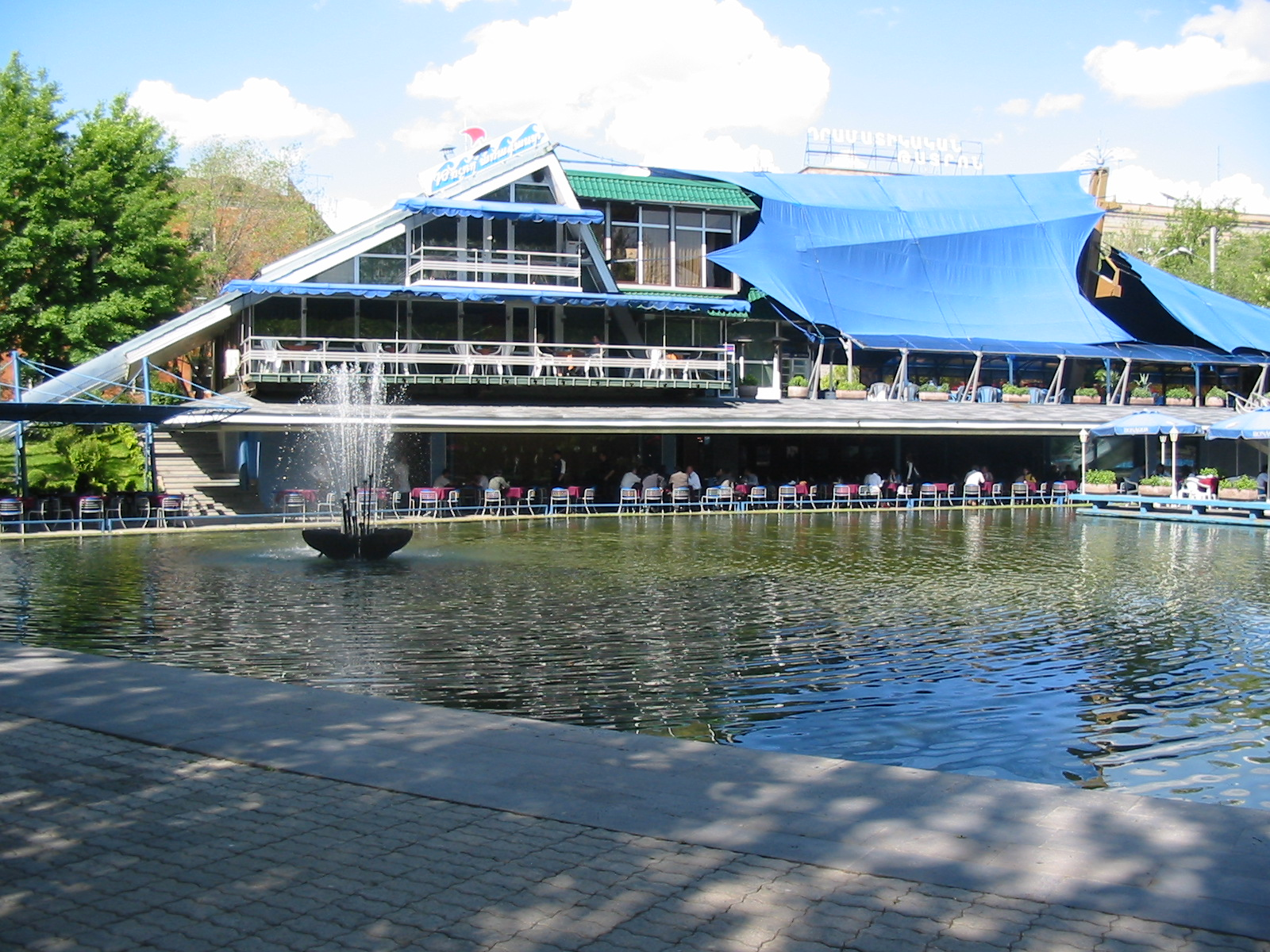
Poplavok lake at the Circular Park

After Armenia fell under Soviet rule between 1920 and 1921, Yerevan became the first among the cities in the Soviet Union for which a general plan was developed. The "General Plan of Yerevan" developed by the academic Alexander Tamanian, was approved in 1924. It was initially designed for a population of 150,000. The city was quickly transformed into a modern industrial metropolis of over one million people. New educational, scientific and cultural institutions were founded as well.

Tamanian incorporated national traditions with contemporary urban construction. His design presented a radial-circular arrangement that overlaid the existing city and incorporated much of its existing street plan. As a result, many historic buildings in the centre (modern-day Kentron district) of Yerevan were demolished, including churches, mosques, the Safavid fortress, baths, bazaars and caravanserais.

Within the years, Kentron has become the most developed district of Yerevan, something that created a significant gap compared with other districts in the city. Most of the educational, cultural and scientific institutions were centred in the Kentron district. It also became home to administrative buildings of Armenia, including the Presidential Palace, the National Assembly of Armenia, the Central Bank of Armenia, the National Security Service and most of the ministry buildings.

== Demographics ==
Religious buildings and historical sites:

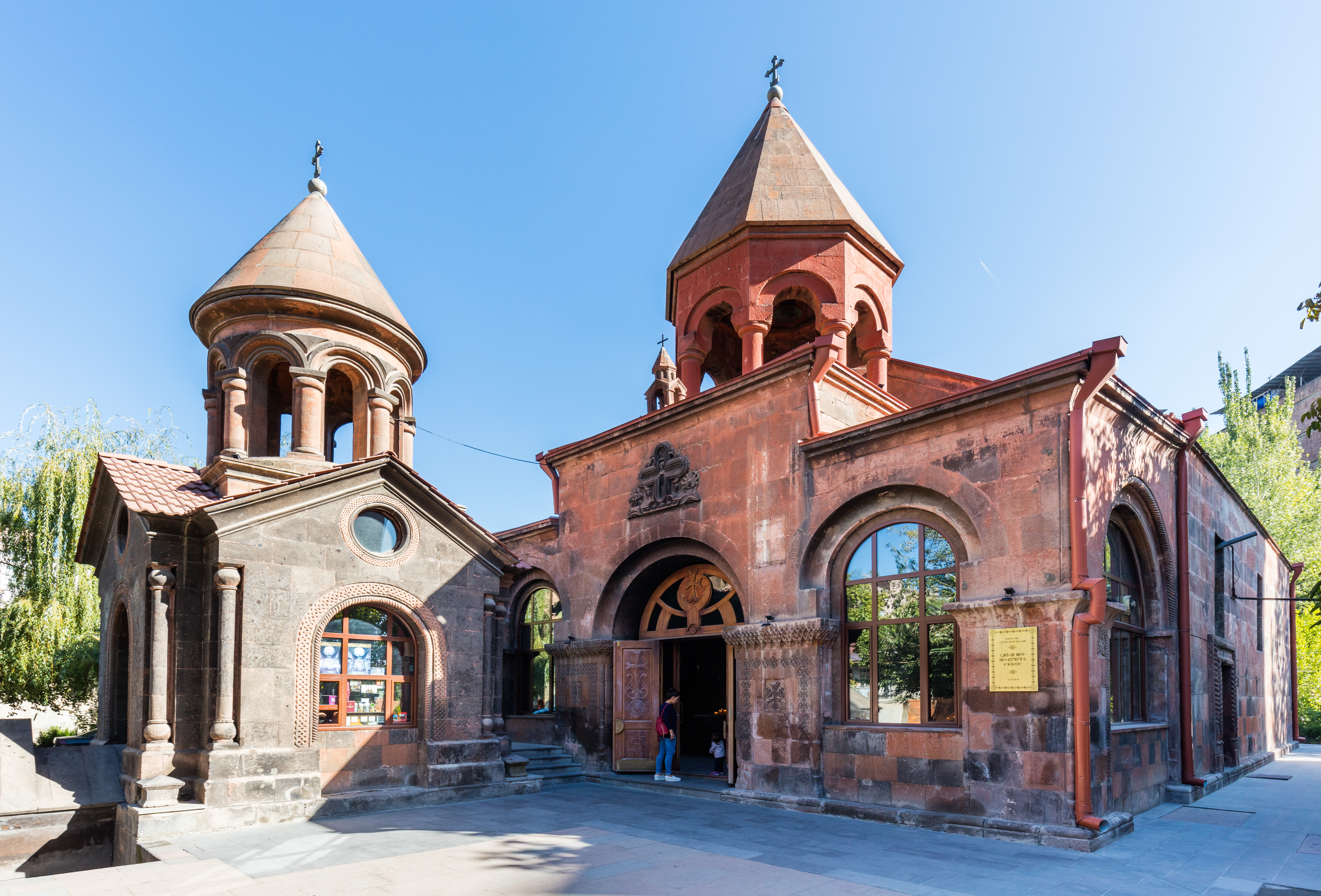
Zoravor Surp Astvatsatsin Church

- Zoravor Surp Astvatsatsin Church
- Saint Sarkis Cathedral
- Katoghike Church
- Saint John the Baptist Church
- Saint Gregory Cathedral
- Surp Anna Church
- Blue Mosque
- Kond neighbourhood
- Yerevan Red Bridge of the 17th century

== Culture ==
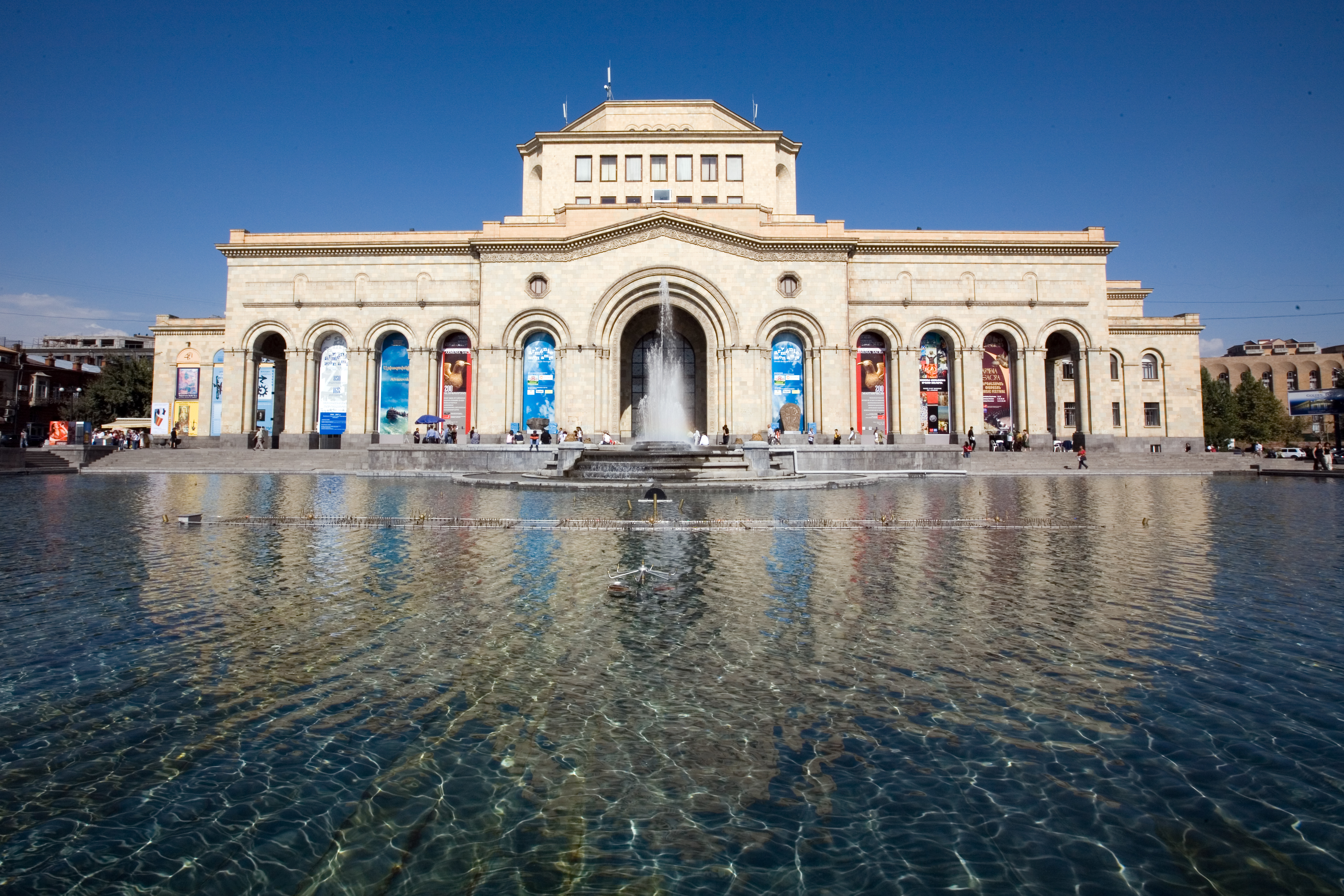
The National Gallery of Armenia

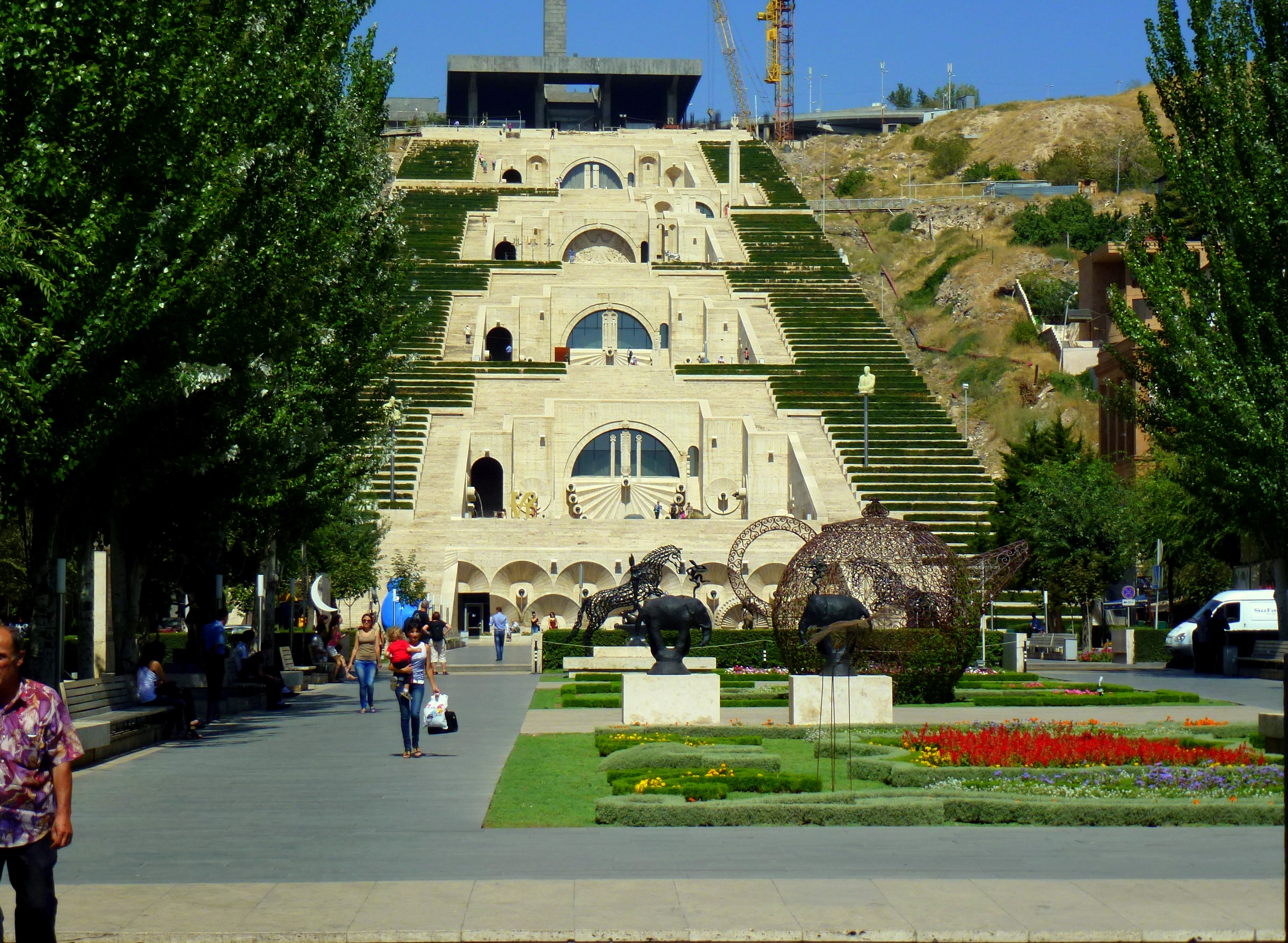
Cafesjian Museum of Art at the Yerevan Cascade

- National Library of Armenia
- National Gallery of Armenia
- Yerevan Opera Theater
- Sundukyan State Academic Theatre
- Paronyan Musical Comedy Theatre
- Stanislavski Russian Theatre
- Hovhannes Tumanyan Puppet Theatre of Yerevan
- Komitas Chamber Music Hall
- Arno Babajanian Concert Hall
- Museum-Institute of Ancient Manuscripts
- History Museum of Armenia
- Cafesjian Museum of Art
- Yerevan History Museum
- The Armenian Genocide Museum-Institute
- Sergei Parajanov Museum
- House-Museum of Aram Khachaturian
- Khnko Aper Children's Library
- Avetik Isahakyan Central Library
- Center of Contemporary Experimental Art

Entertainment and recreation:

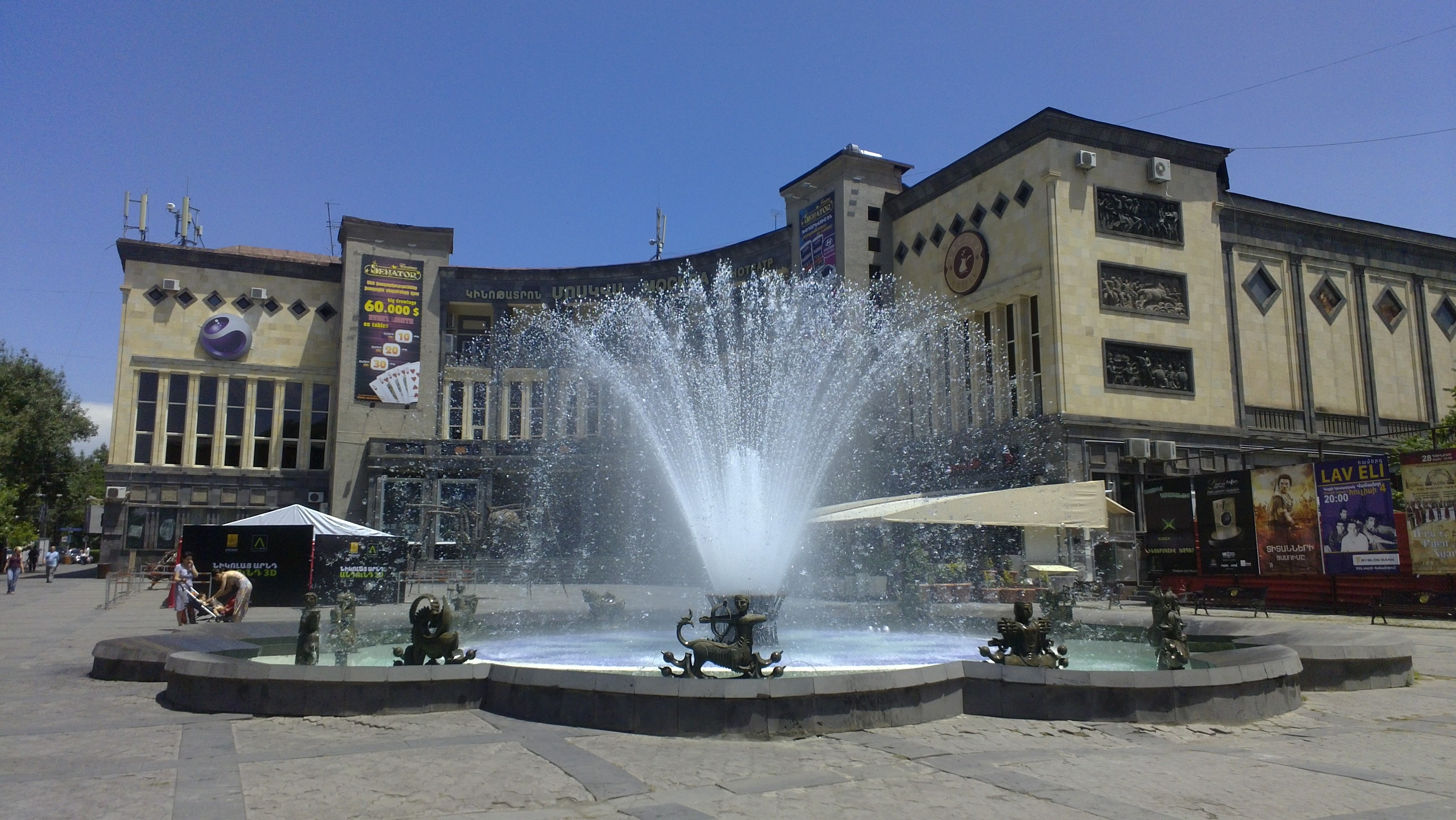
Moscow Cinema

- Moscow Cinema
- Nairi Cinema
- Yerevan Circus
- Yerevan Cascade
- Tashir Mall
- Yerevan Vernissage of art exhibition

== Transportation ==
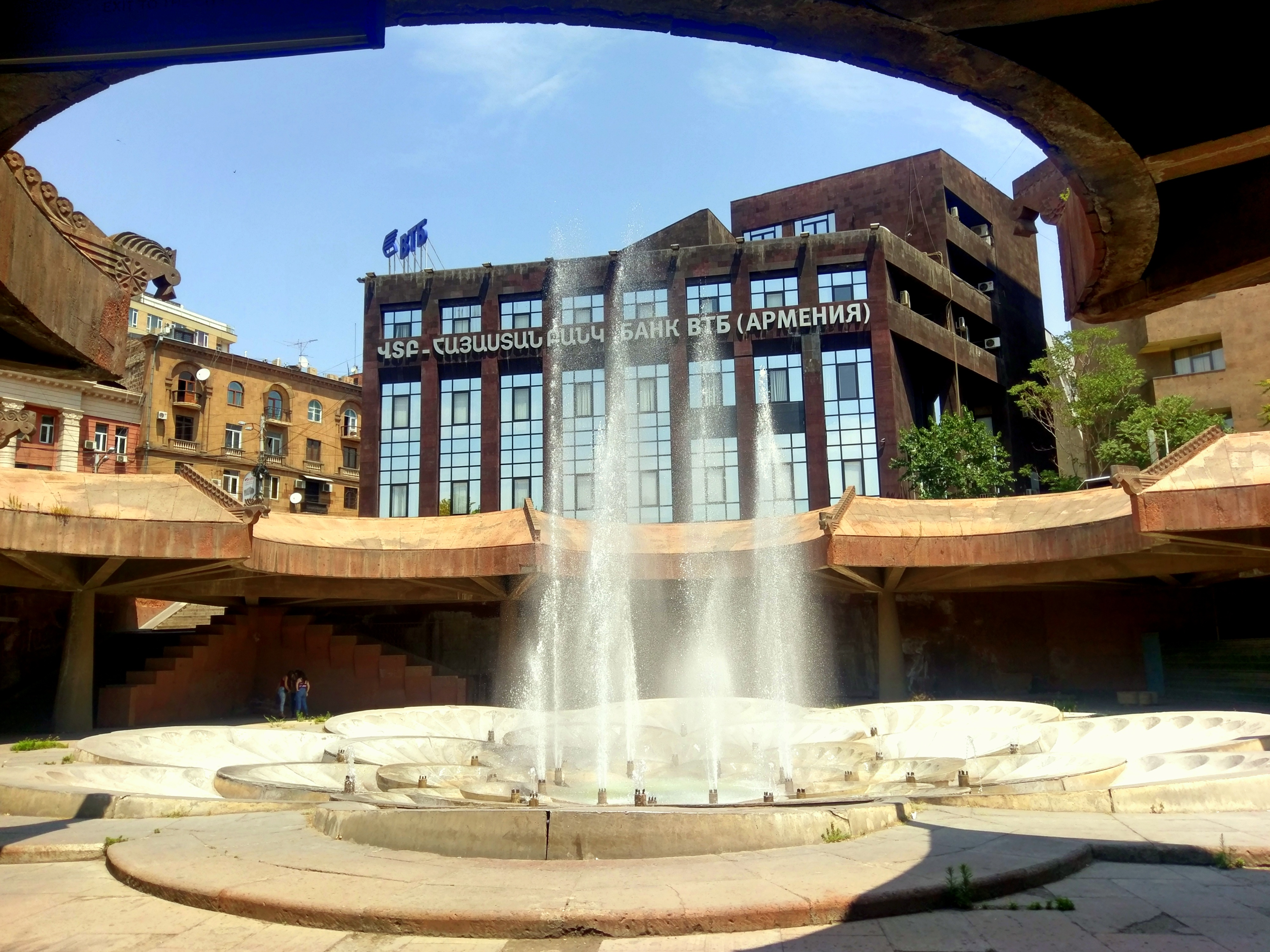
Fountains at the Republic Square metro station

Kentron district is served by a public transport network of buses and trolleybuses.

- The Yerevan underground metro has 4 stations in the Kentron district:
  - Marshal Baghramyan station
  - Yeritasardakan station
  - Republic Square station
  - General Andranik station

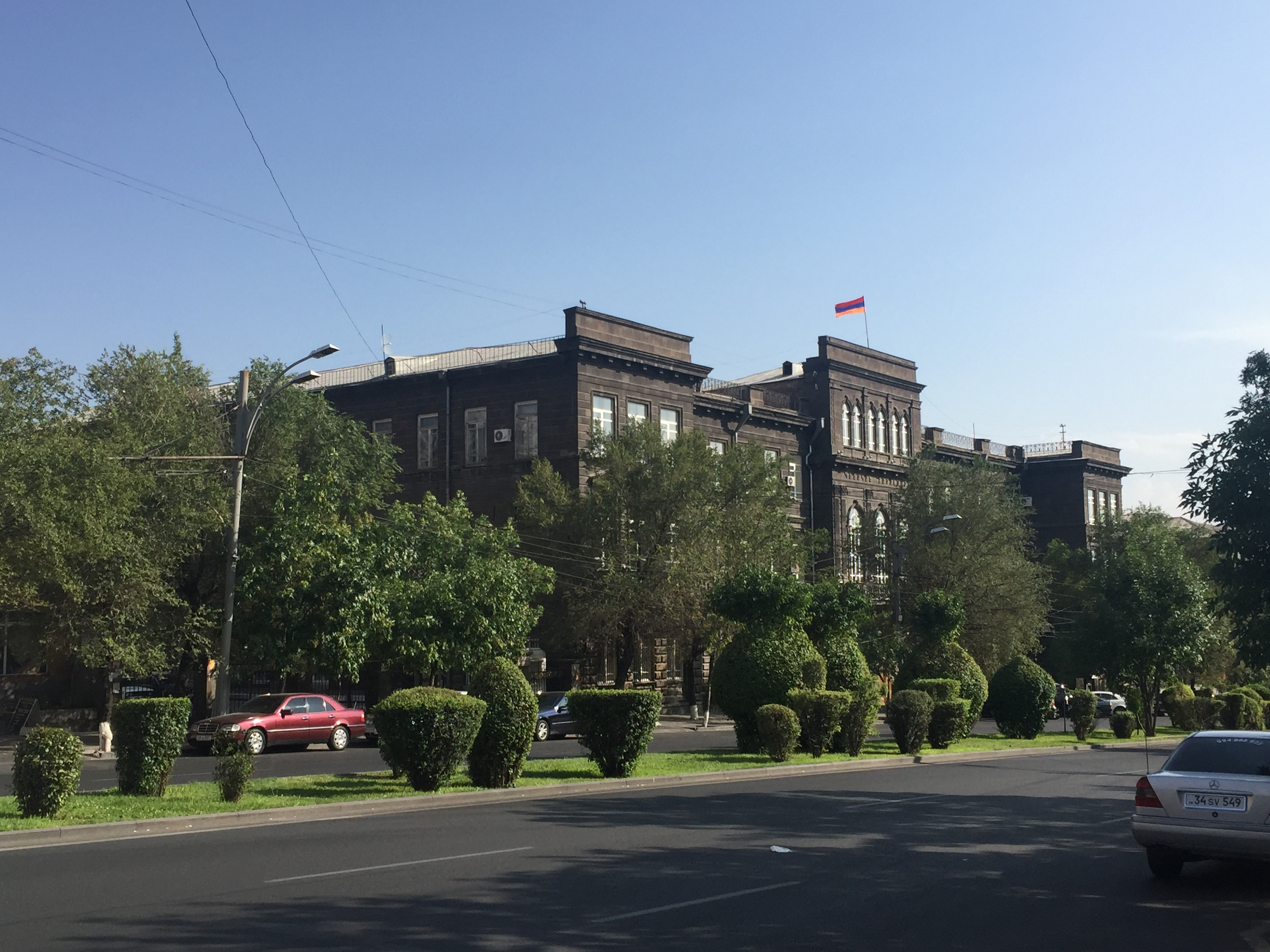
Abovyan Street

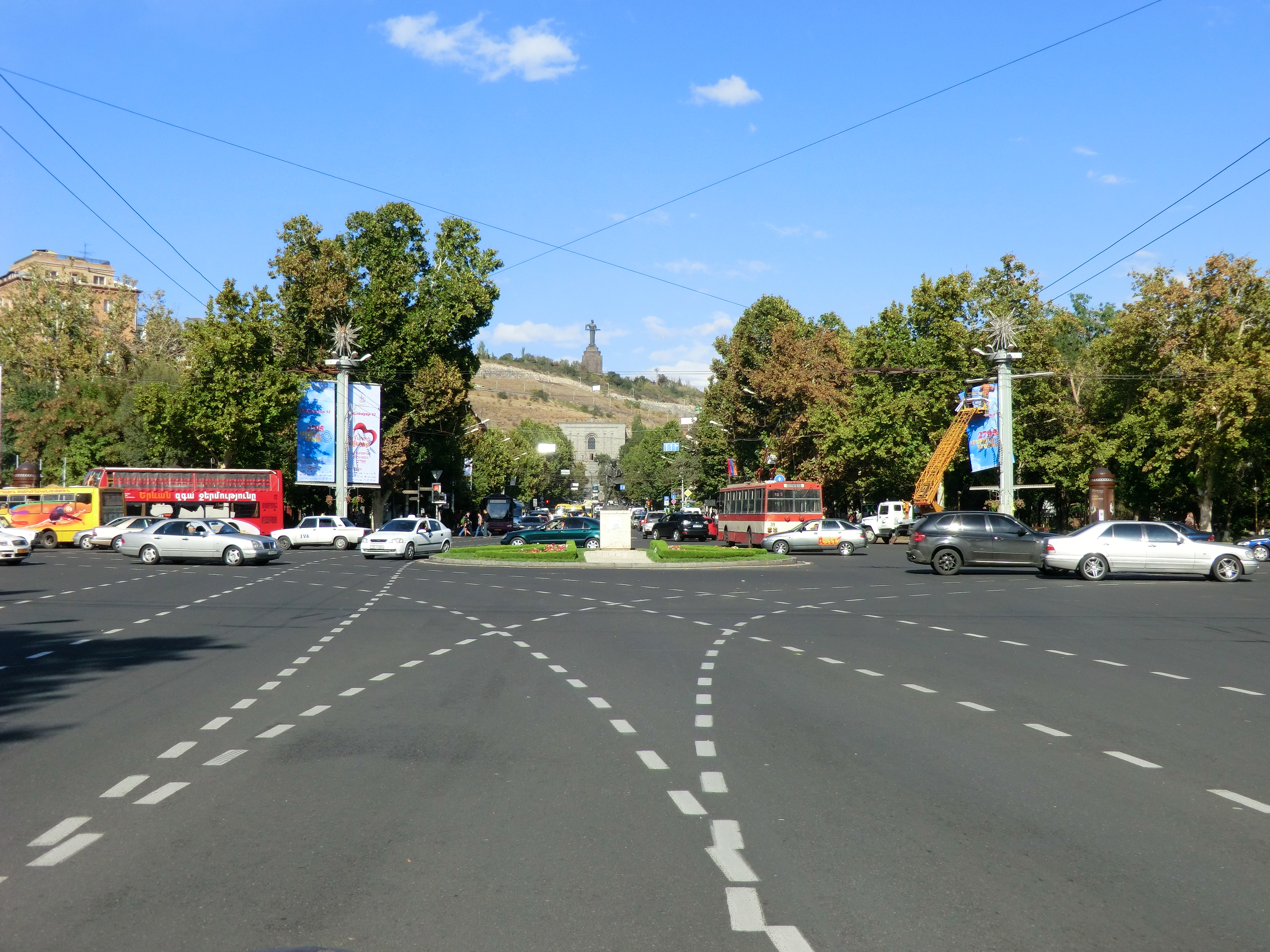
Place de France, with the statue of Jules Bastien-Lepage at the centre

- Aram Street
- Abovyan Street
- Mashtots Avenue
- Mikael Nalbandian Street
- Amiryan Street
- Tigran Mets (Tigranes the Great) Avenue
- Sayat-Nova Avenue
- Tumanyan Street
- Marshal Baghramyan Avenue
- Charents Street
- Paronyan Street
- Proshyan Street
- Italy Street
- Vazgen Sargsyan Street
- Argishti I Street
- Northern Avenue
- Saralanj Avenue
- Republic Square
- Freedom Square
- Charles Aznavour Square
- Andrei Sakharov Square
- Square of Russia
- Place de France
- Stepan Shahumyan Square
- Alexandr Myasnikyan Square

== Economy ==
Industrial plants:

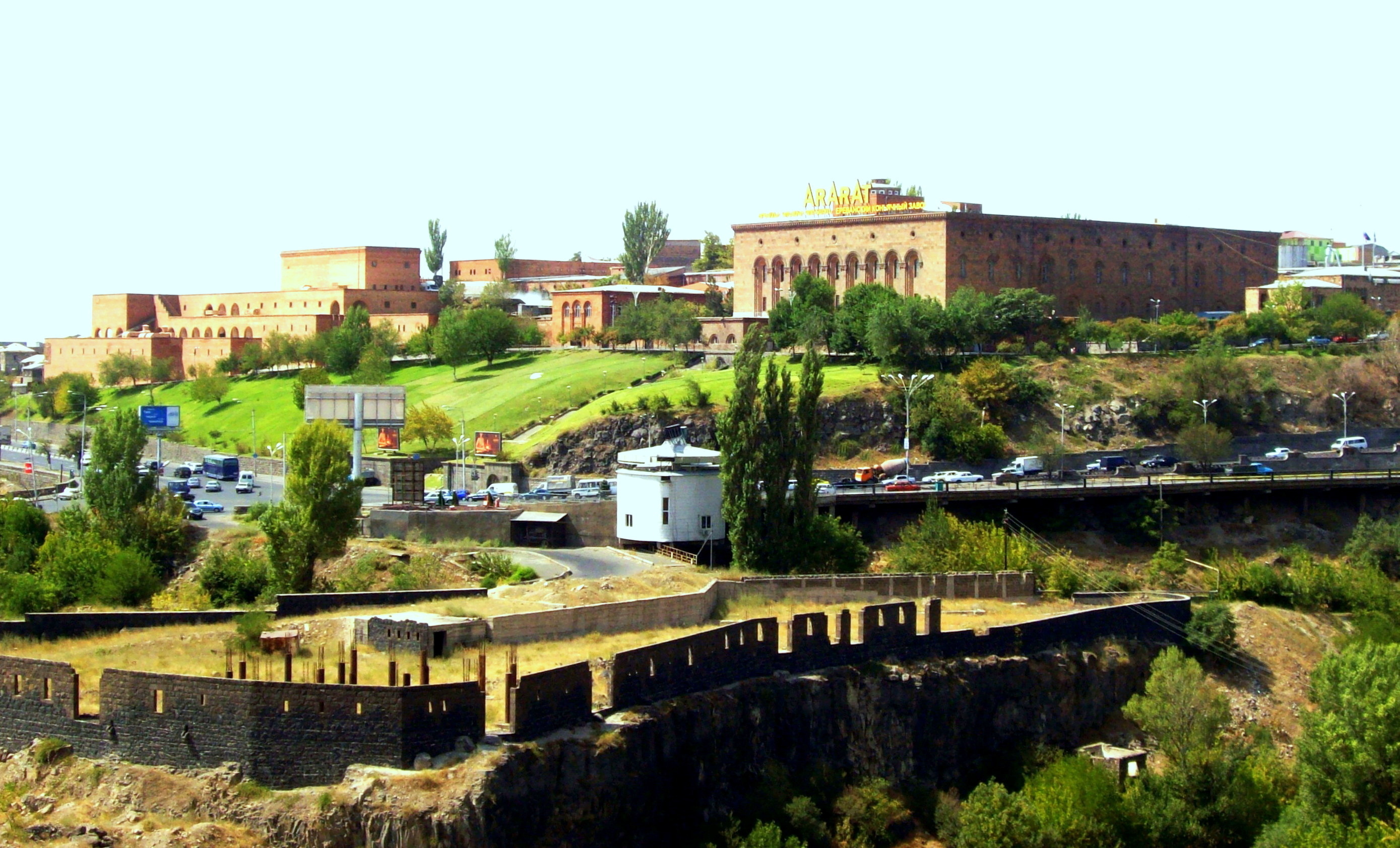
Yerevan Brandy Company

- Yerevan Ararat Wine Factory
- Yerevan Brandy Company
- Electro-House engineering factory

== Education ==
Educational institutions:

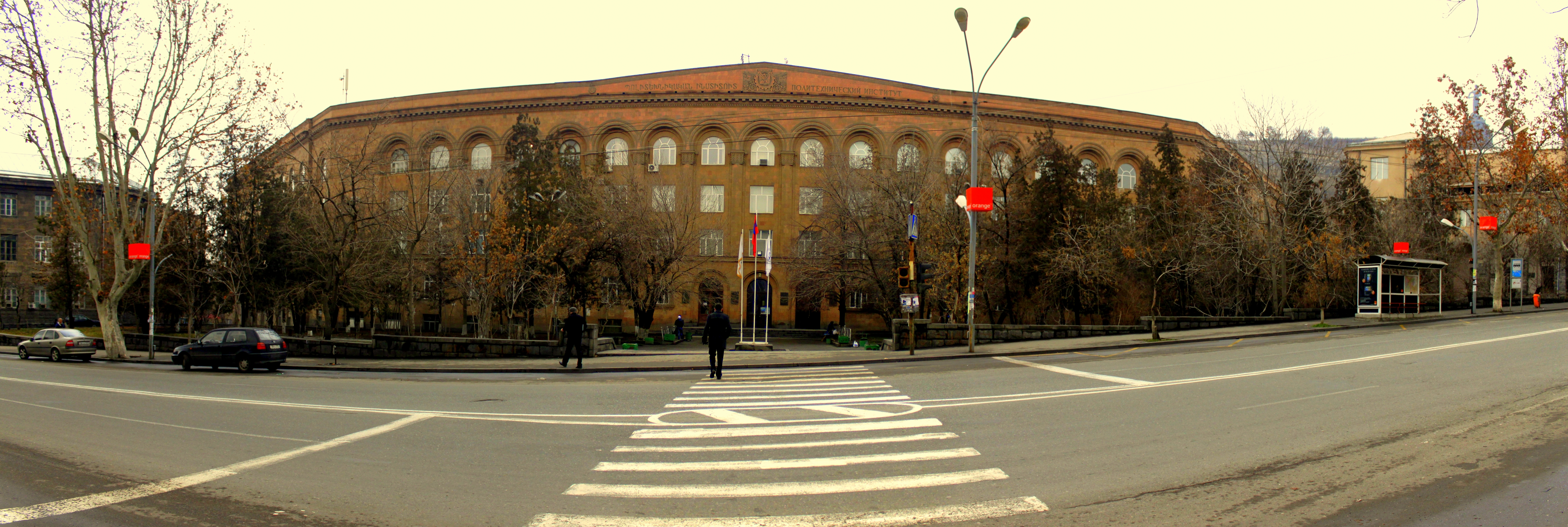
State Engineering University of Armenia

- Yerevan State University
- Yerevan State University of Architecture and Construction
- Yerevan State Musical Conservatory
- Armenian State Pedagogical University
- Yerevan State Medical University
- State Engineering University of Armenia
- Yerevan State Linguistic University
- Armenian State University of Economics
- Armenian National Academy of Sciences

== Sport ==
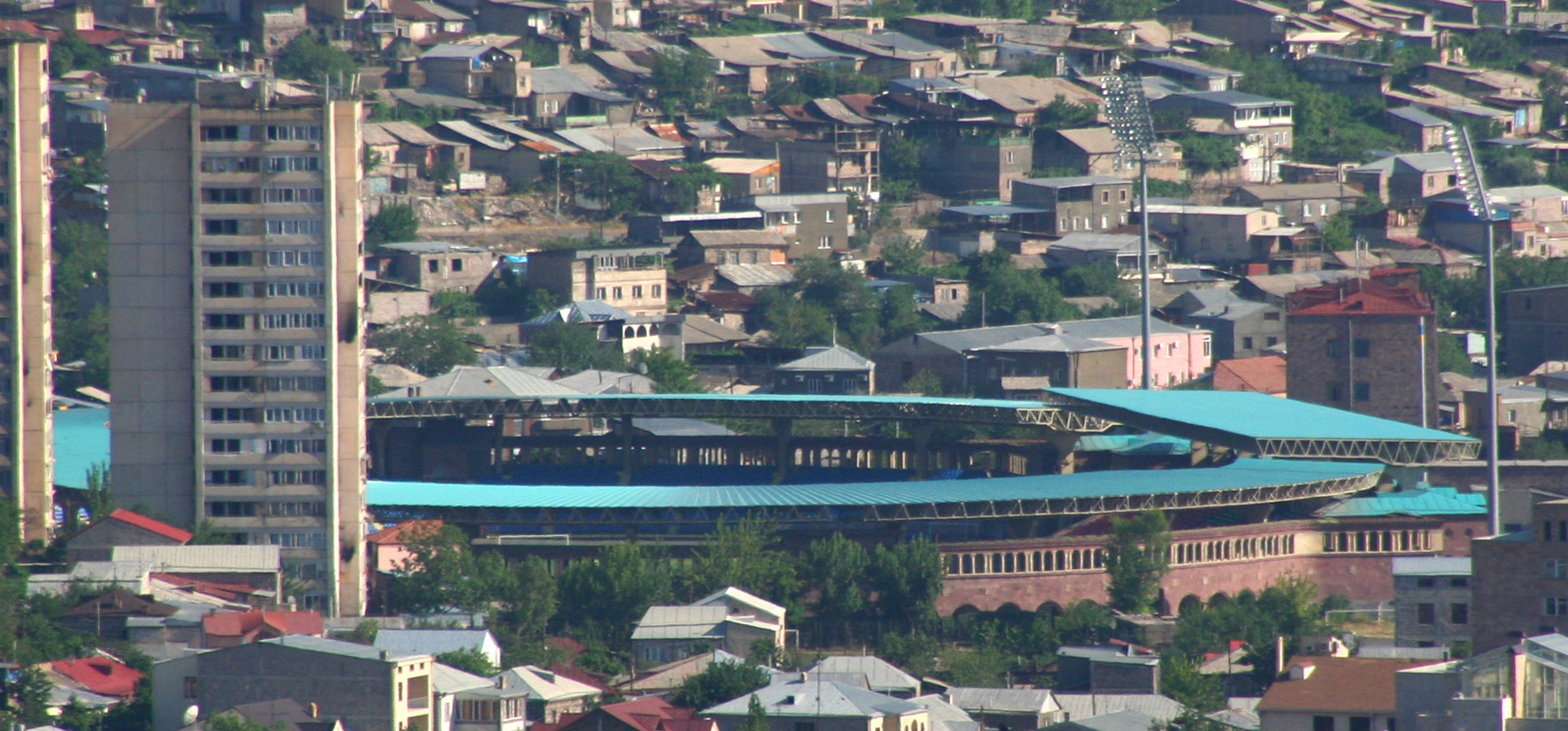
The Vazgen Sargsyan Republican Stadium, Yerevan

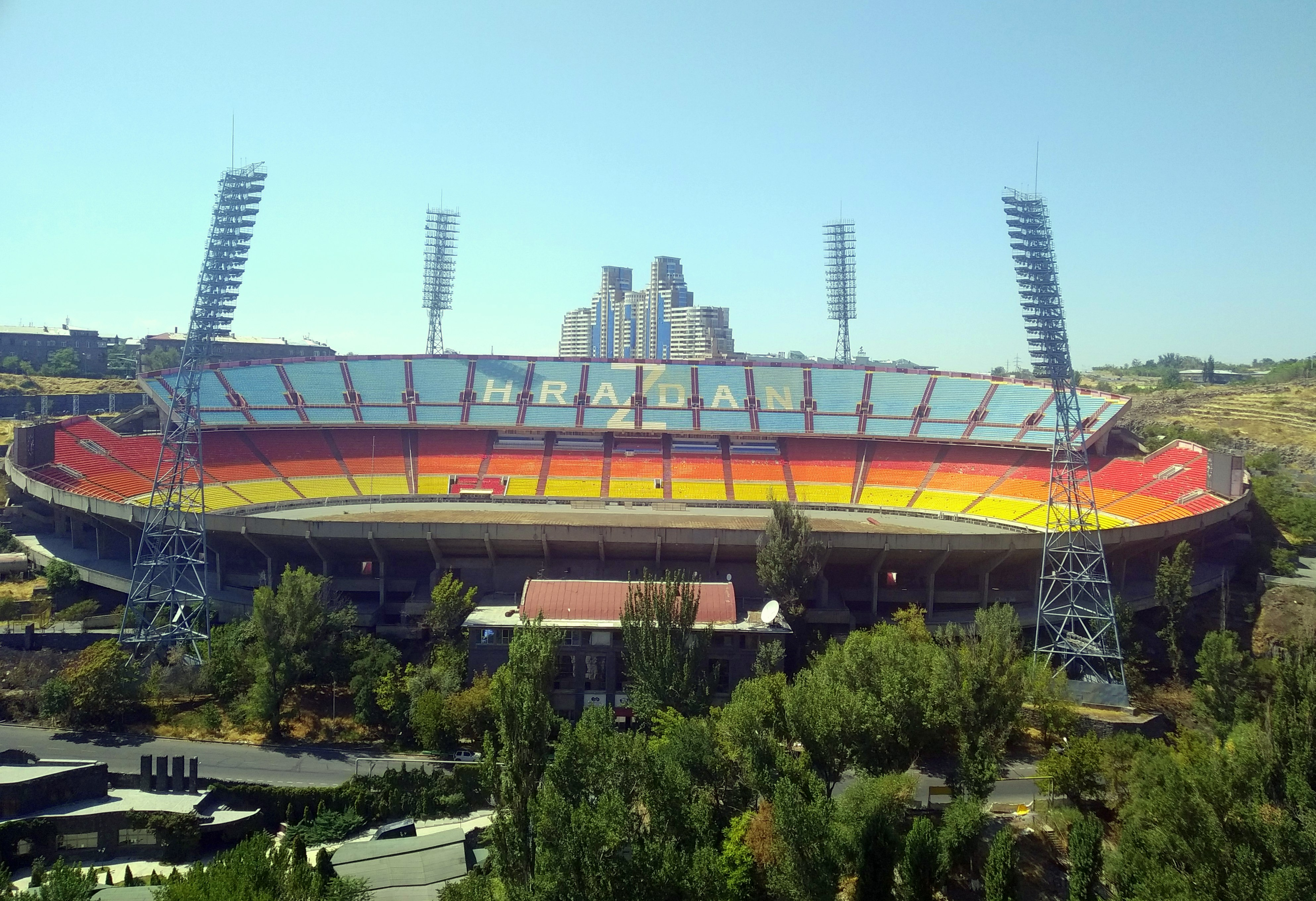
The Hrazdan Stadium, Yerevan

- Armenia Sports Stadium
- Vazgen Sargsyan Republican Stadium
- Tigran Petrosian Chess House
- Hrazdan Stadium
- Karen Demirchyan Complex
- Orange Tennis Club
- Master Class Tennis Club
- Dinamo Sports Arena
- Kilikia Sports Hall
- Pyunik Stadium
- Pyunik Training Centre

== Gallery ==
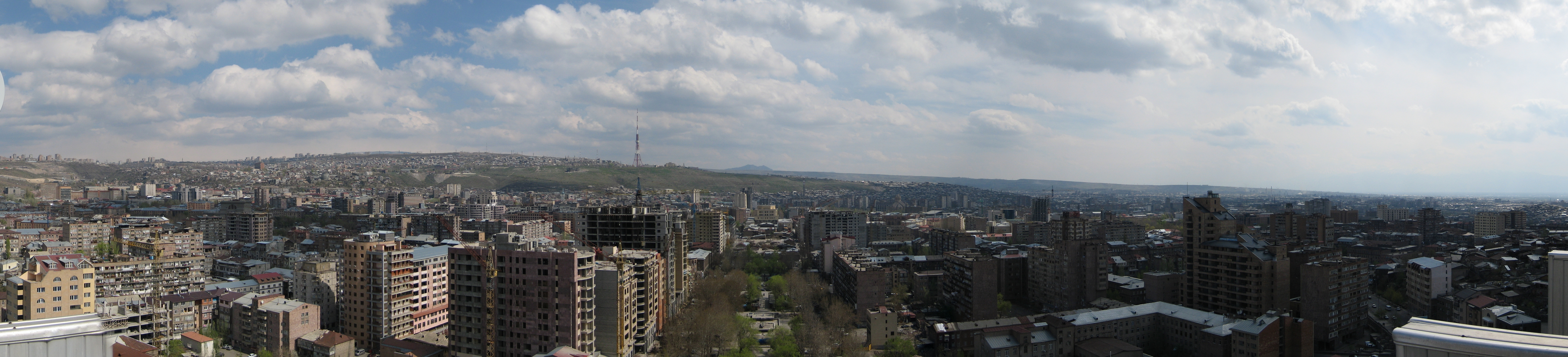
Panoramic view of Kentron district

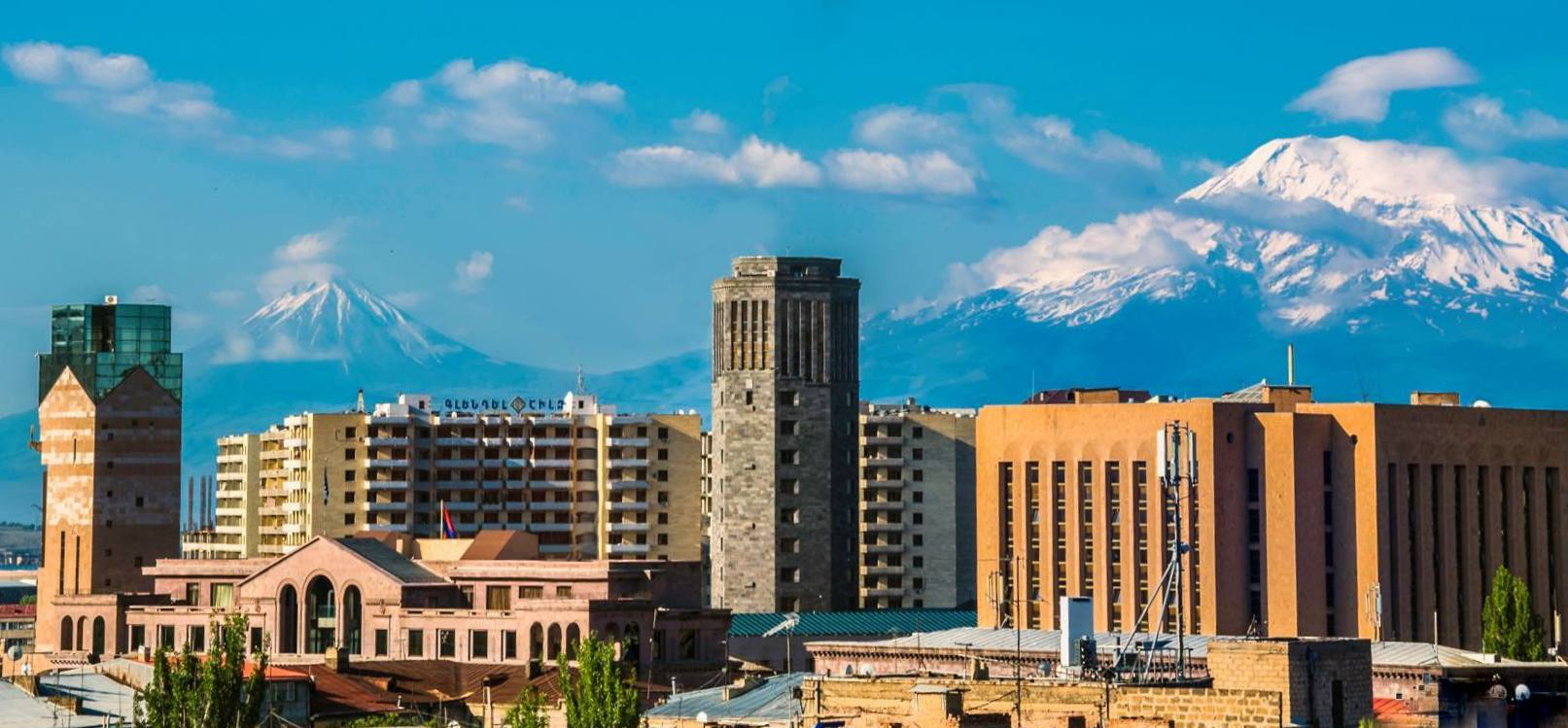
Panoramic view from the Kentron district (from left to right): The City Hall clock tower, Ardshinbank (foreground), Glendale Hills residential buildings (background), the Yerevan Ararat Brandy Factory tower, the Russian Embassy, the Mountains of Ararat in the overall background.

Kentron district

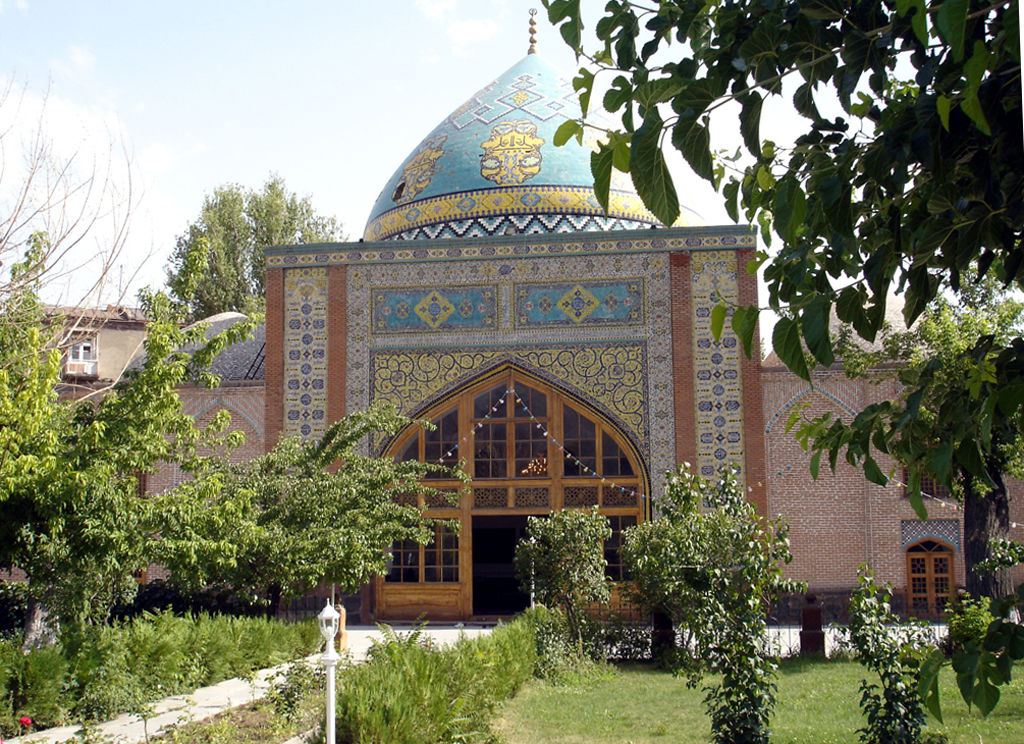
The Blue Mosque

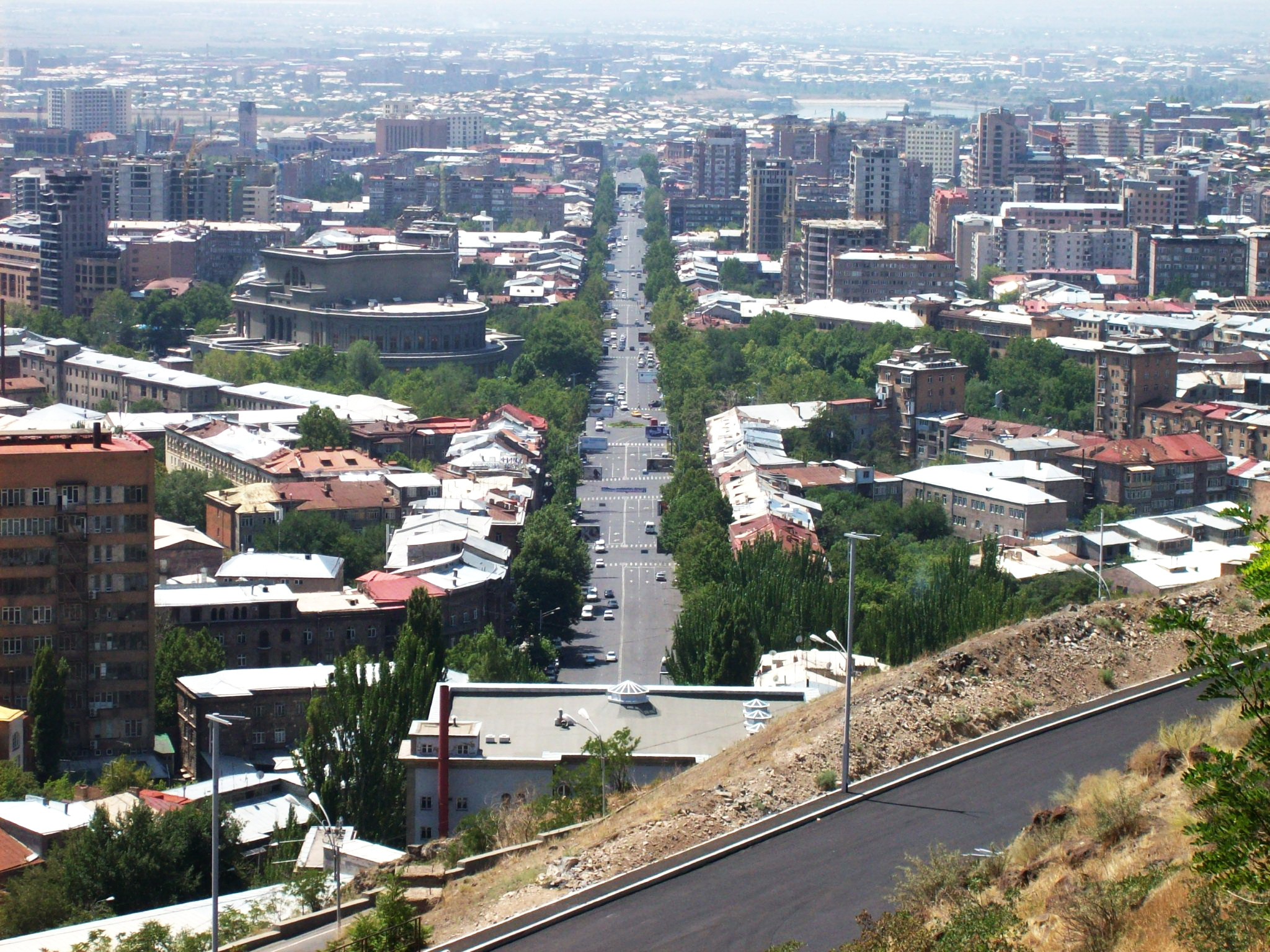
Mashtots Avenue

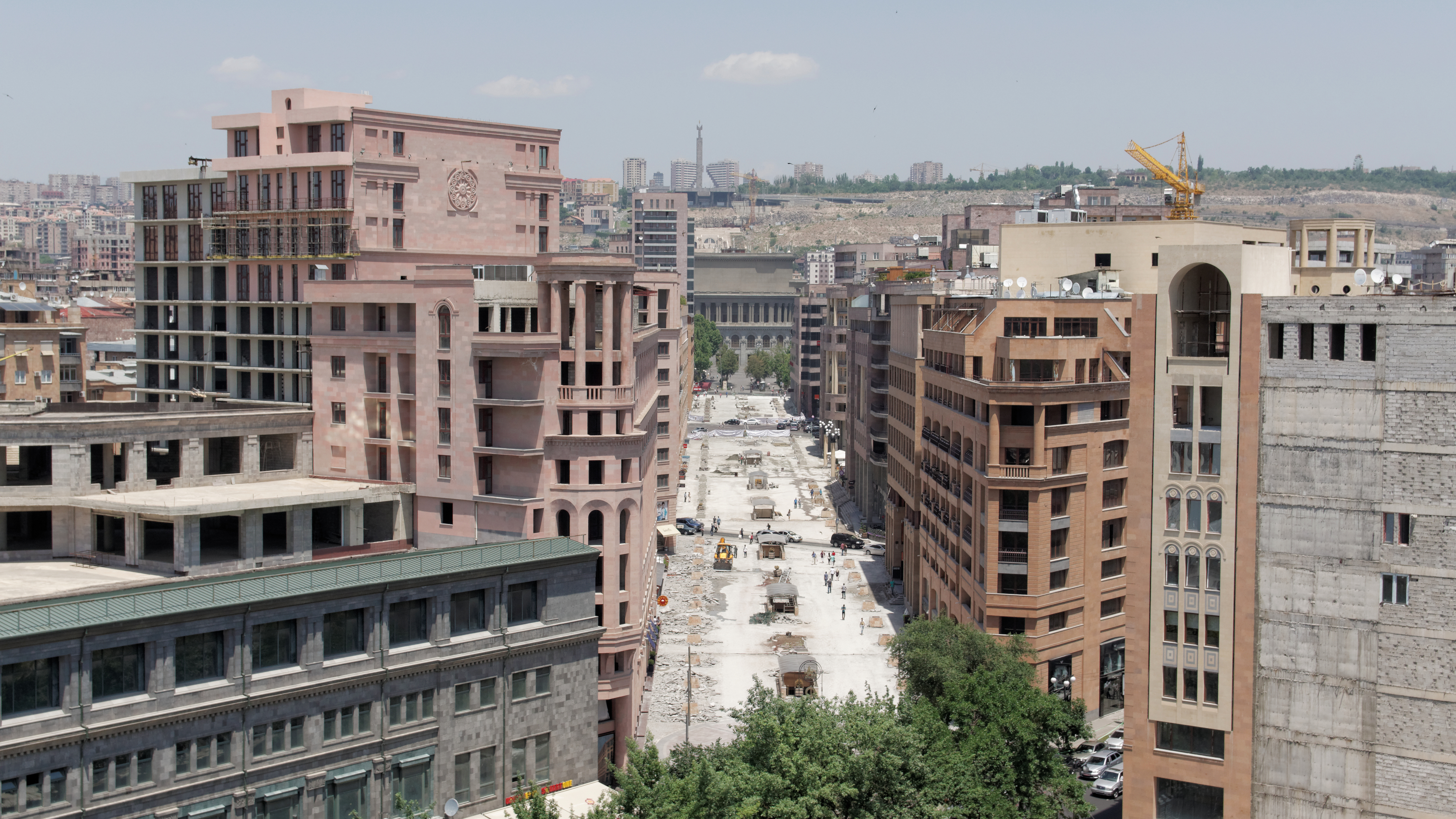
The Northern Avenue

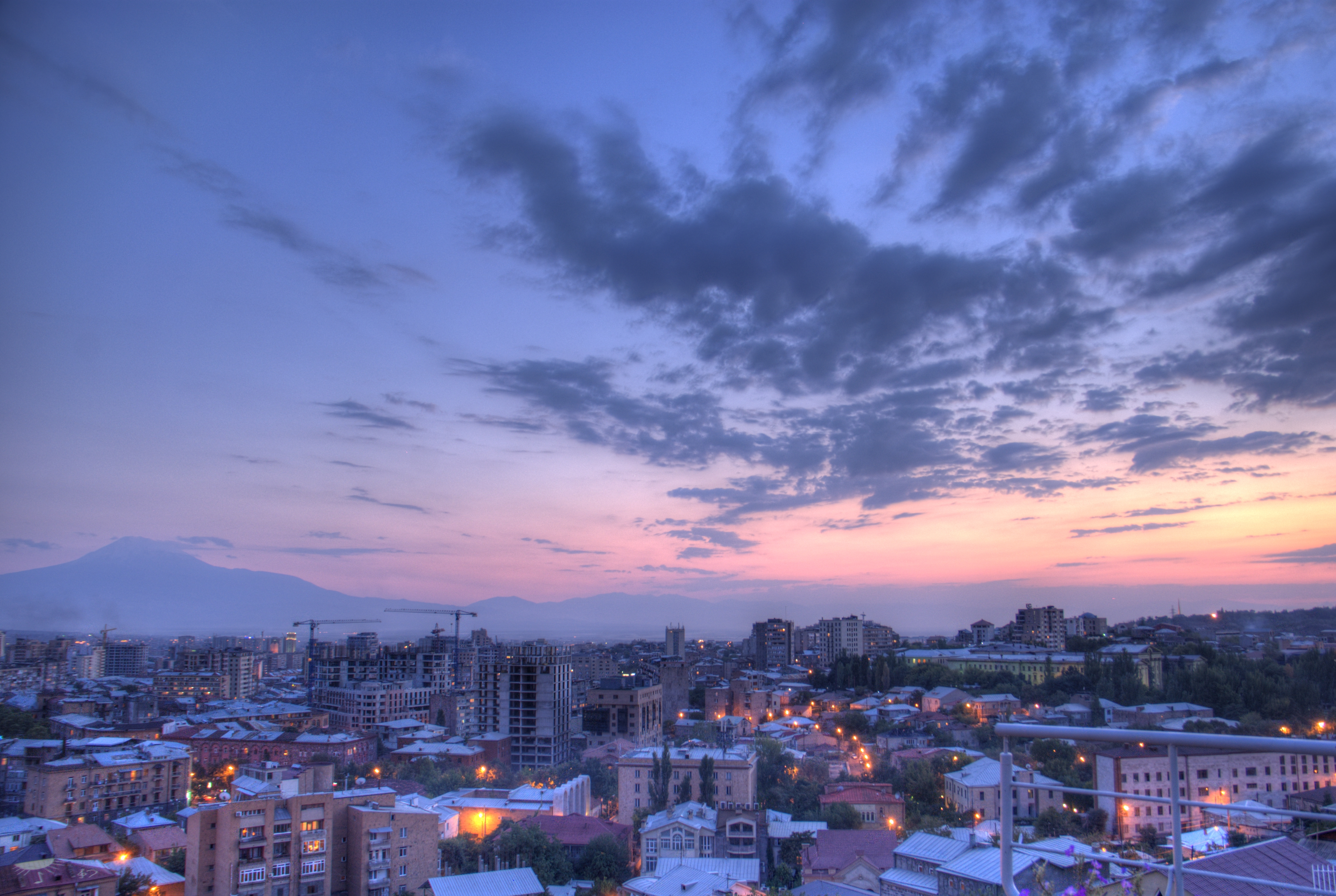
Sunset over the district

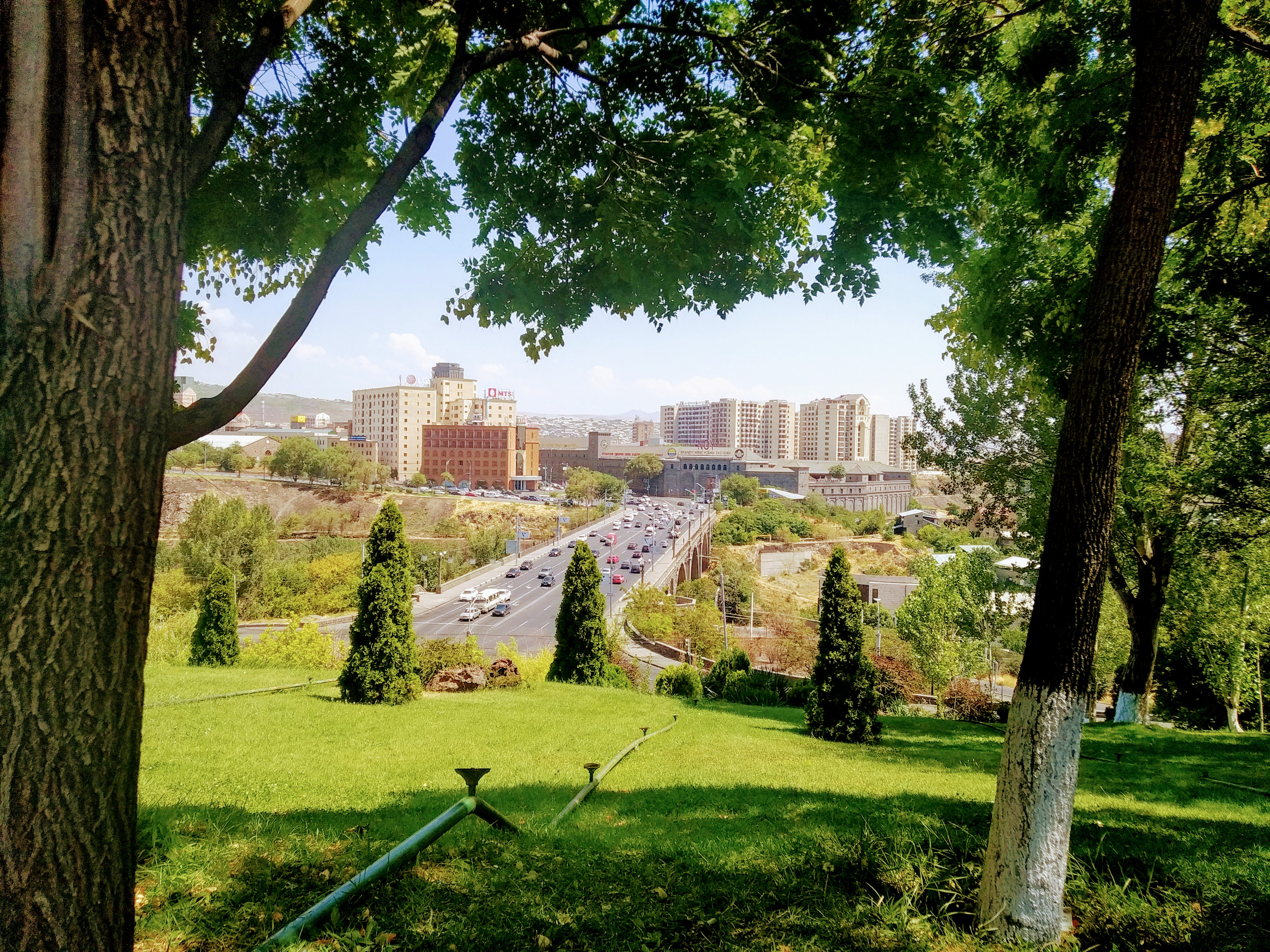
Victory bridge at Kentron district
