= Yerevan Vernissage =

Market in Yerevan, Armenia

Coordinates: 40°10′36″N 44°31′2″E

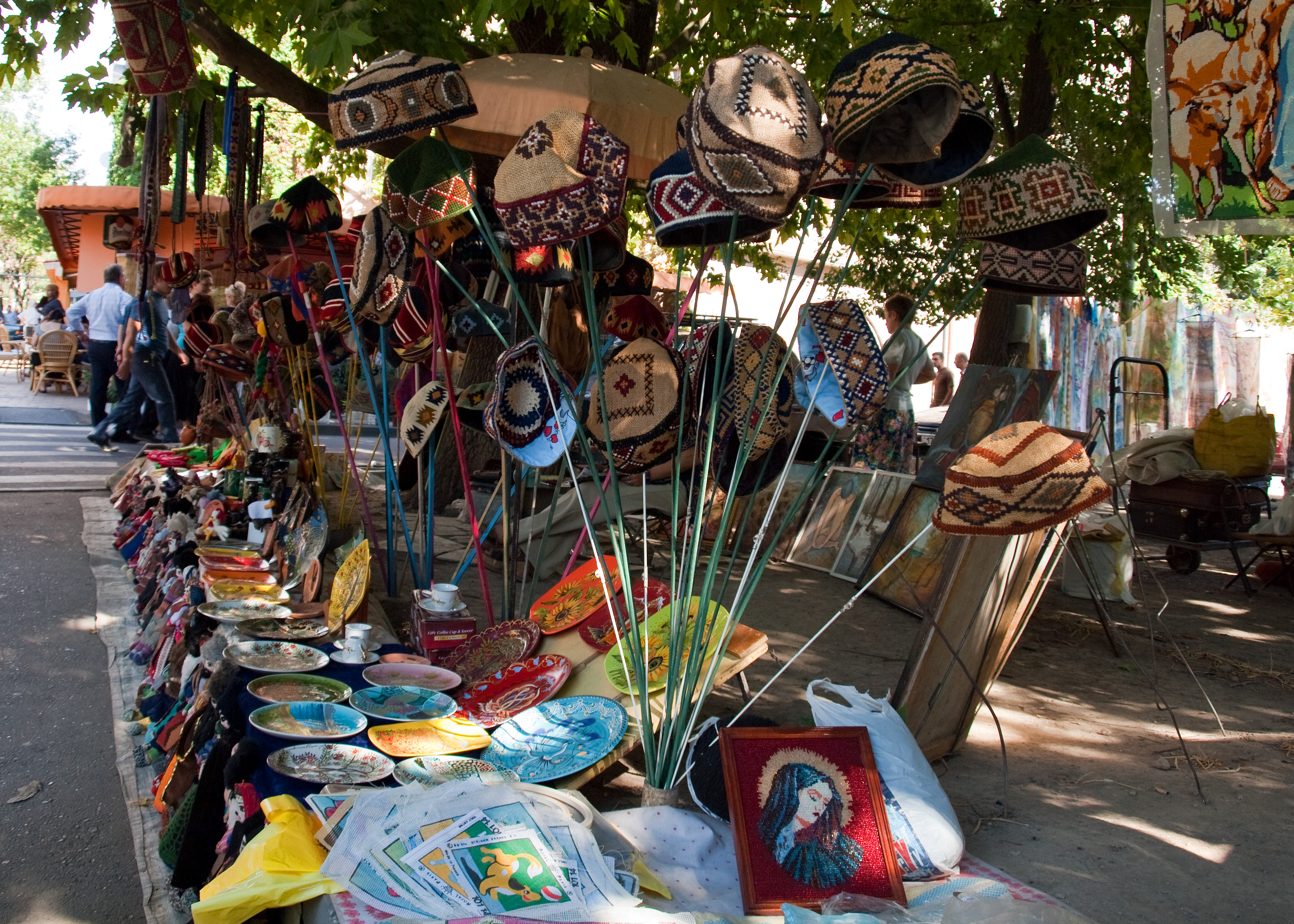

Yerevan Vernissage (Armenian: Վերնիսաժ Vernisazh) is a large open-air market in Yerevan, Armenia. The name of the market is the derived from the French word vernissage. The market lies along Aram Street and Buzand Street at a length of 350 metres (1,150 ft), connecting the Hanrapetutyun street with the Khanjyan street. The market mainly features a collection of different types of traditional Armenian art works.

== Overview ==
The Yerevan Vernissage is an open-air exhibition-market functioning every day. It was formed during the 1980s by Armenian artists who started to display their art works in the square next to the Artists' Union of Armenia (the current Charles Aznavour Square). Others have used the park next to Komitas State Conservatory to show their works. Later, the Vernissage was moved to Martiros Saryan garden in front of the Opera House. The exhibition-market was gradually enlarged and finally moved to Aram and Buzand streets, starting with the Republic square metro station and ending up with the statue of Vardan Mamikonyan. However, painters are still using the Saryan park to show their painting works.

In addition to carved wood and art works, traditional carpets, old collections of coins and medallions, books, jewellery, musical instruments, electronics and even pets are found in the market.

== Gallery ==
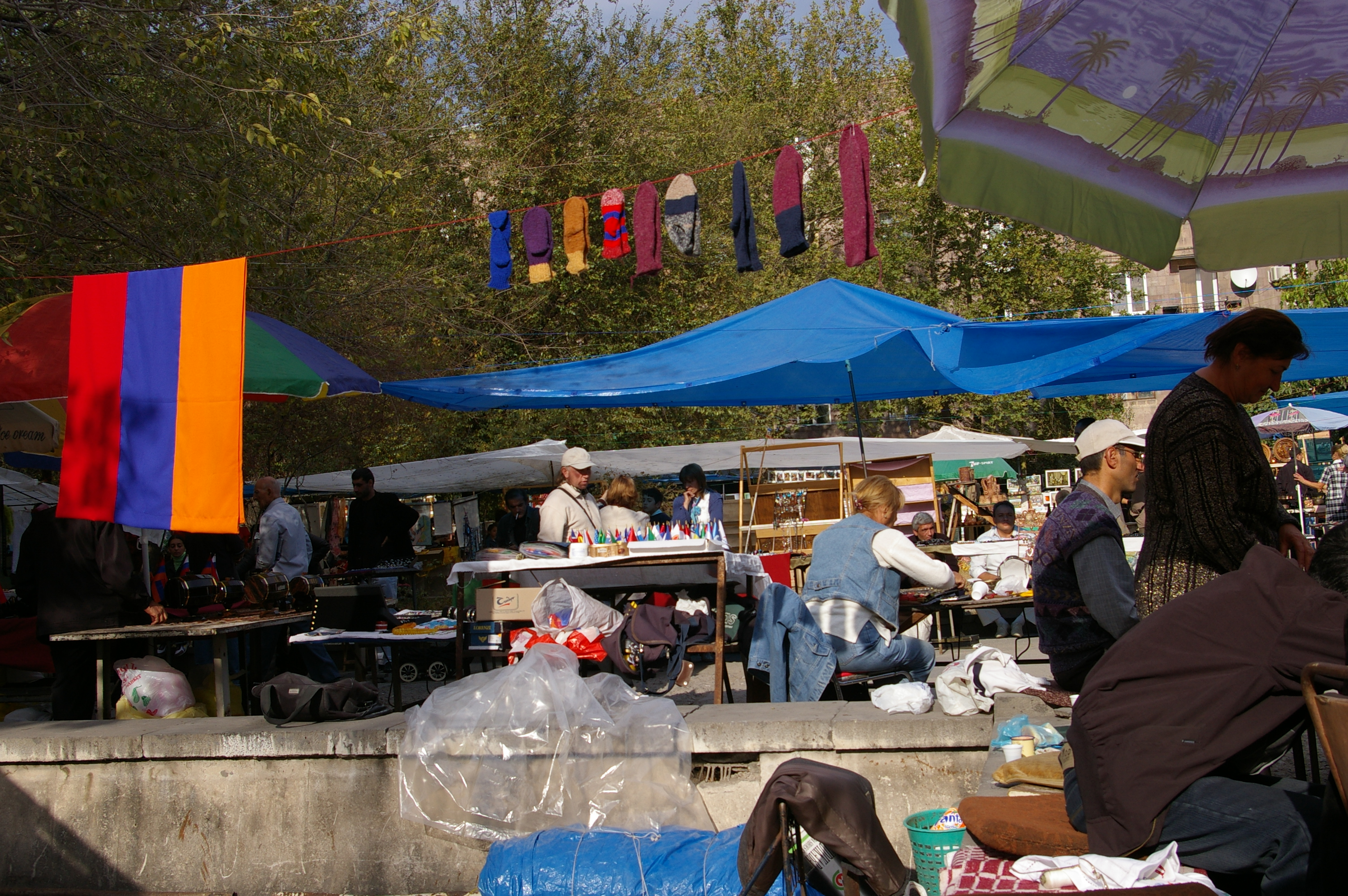

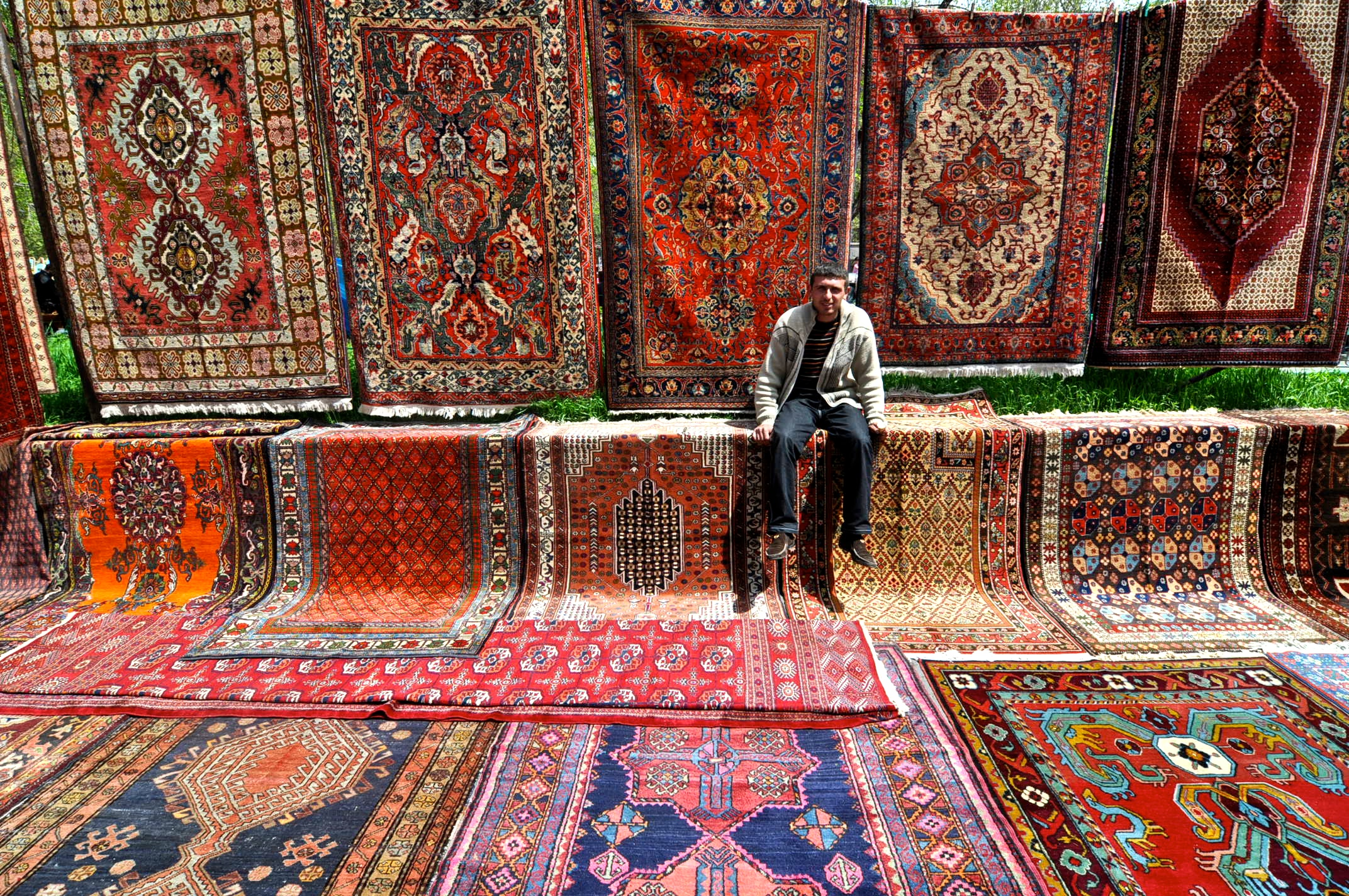
