= Blue Mosque, Yerevan =

18th-century Iranian mosque in Yerevan, Armenia

Blue Mosque
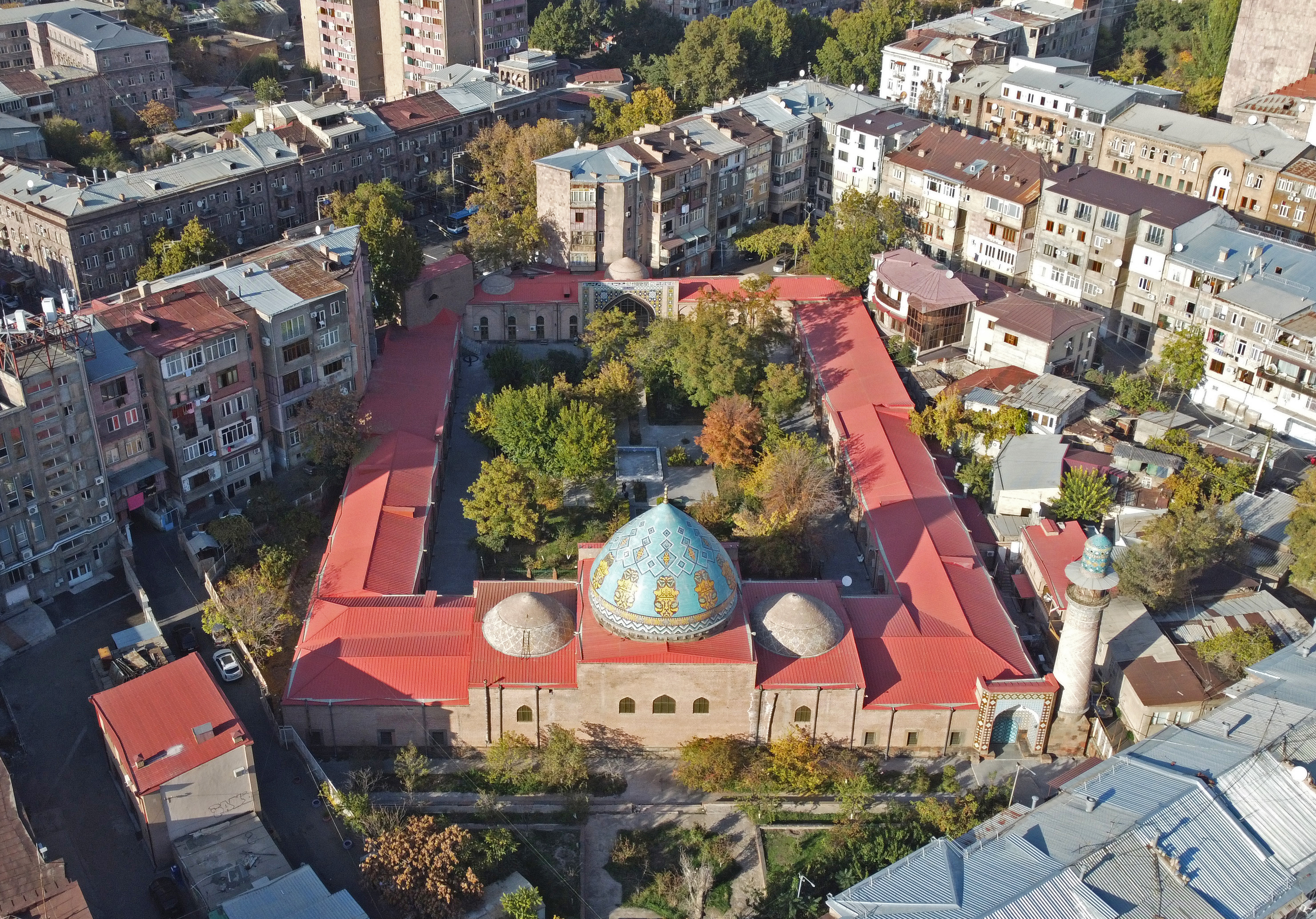
- An aerial view of the mosque, in 2023

Religion
- Affiliation: Islam
- Branch/tradition: Shia (Twelver)
- Ecclesiastical or organisational status: Mosque (until mid-1920s); Secular use (mid-1920s–1996); Mosque (since 1996); Cultural center (since 2015)
- Status: Active

Location
- Location: 12 Mashtots Avenue, Yerevan
- Country: Armenia
- Interactive map of Blue Mosque
- Coordinates: 40°10′41″N 44°30′20″E

Architecture
- Type: Mosque architecture
- Style: Iranian
- Founder: Hoseyn Ali Khan
- Completed: 1179 AH (1765/1766 CE); 1996 (restored)

Specifications
- Dome: 3
- Minaret: 1
- Minaret height: 24 m (79 ft)

The Blue Mosque (Armenian: Կապույտ մզկիթ, romanized: Kapuyt mzkit’; Persian: مسجد کبود, romanized: Masjed-e Kabūd; Turkic: Gök Jami) is an 18th-century Iranian Twelver Shia mosque, located in Yerevan, Armenia. It was commissioned by Hoseyn Ali Khan, the khan of the Erivan Khanate. It is one of the oldest extant structures in central Yerevan and the most significant structure from the city's Iranian period. It was the largest of the eight mosques of Yerevan in the 19th century and is the only active mosque in Armenia today.

The mosque was secularized in the 1920s and housed the History Museum of Yerevan for more than five decades. Following Armenia's independence, the mosque was renovated with support from the Iranian government and again started operating as a mosque, serving the Muslims residing in Armenia.

== Names ==
Western visitors in the Russian period, such as H. F. B. Lynch and Luigi Villari, referred to the mosque as Gök Jami (Gok Djami), which translates from Turkish as 'sky blue mosque'. It is known as Kapuyt mzkit’ 'Blue Mosque' in Armenian, although Gyoy mzkit’ is sometimes used as well. It is known in Persian as Masjid-i Juma 'Friday mosque' or Jami-i Shahr 'city congregational mosque'.

== History ==
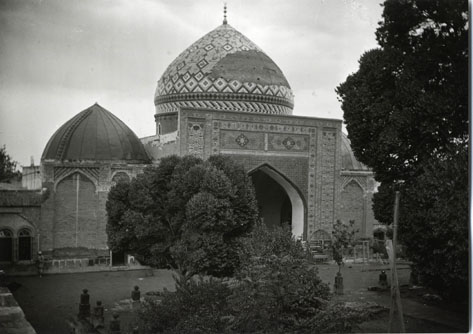
The Blue Mosque in Yerevan, view from the courtyard towards the prayer hall (photo F. Sarre, 1897)

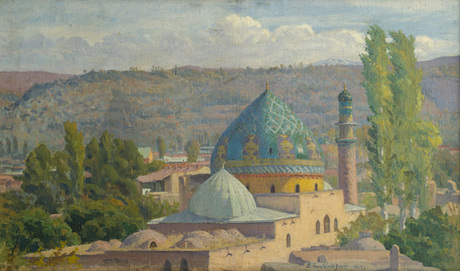
The Blue Mosque by Panos Terlemezian, 1917

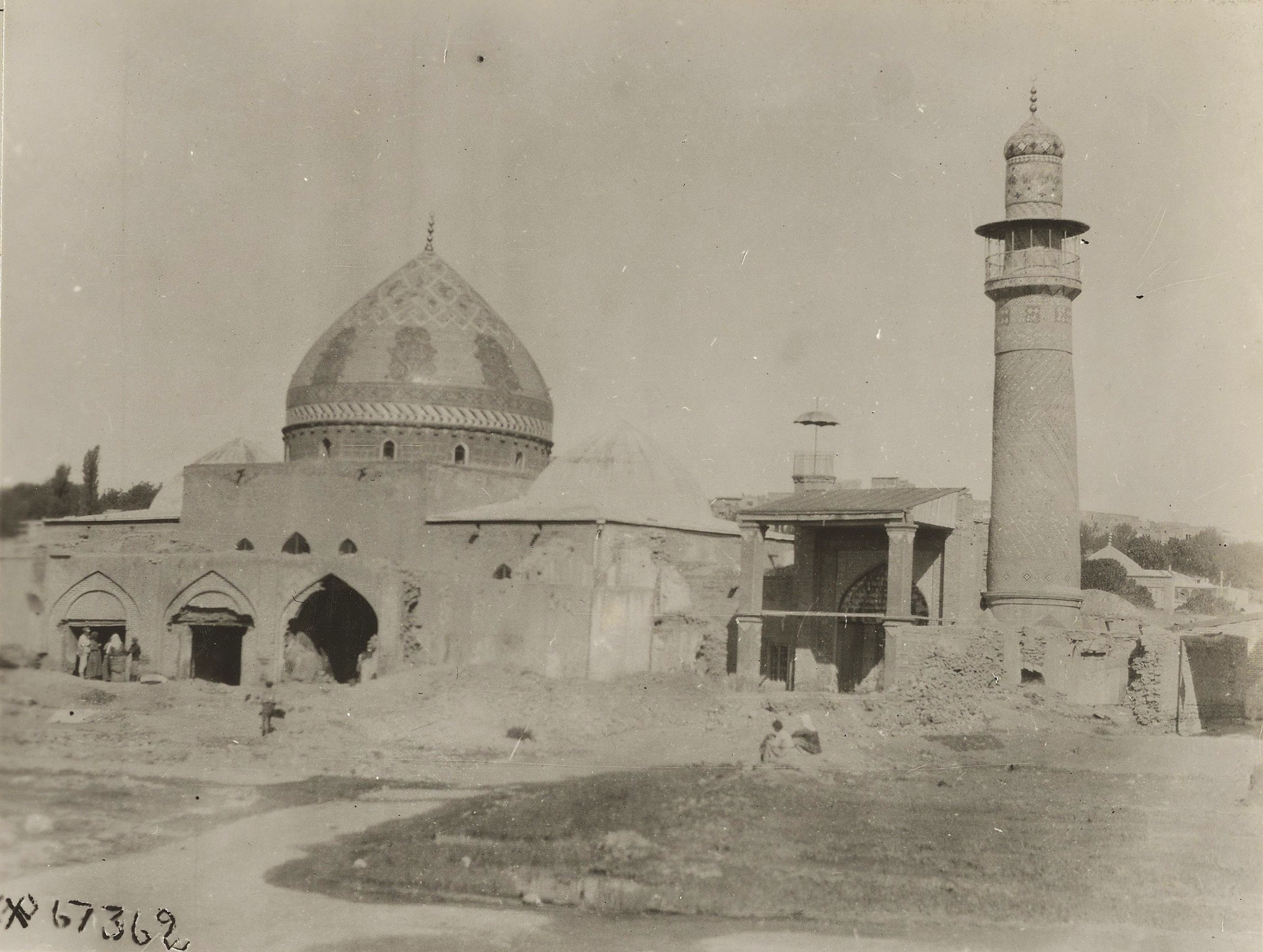
The mosque in 1919

=== Early history ===
The mosque was built in 1765–1766 (AH 1179) (Note: Alternatively given as 1767-1768 (AH 1181) by Markus Ritter "as evidenced by the inscriptions of the main mihrab.) by Hoseyn Ali Khan, the ruler of the Erivan Khanate of Iran, as the city's main Friday mosque. The mosque was the largest of the eight mosques operating in Yerevan when the Russians captured the city in 1827. The mosque underwent substantial redecoration with tiles around 1887-88 (AH 1305), under Russian administration. The mosque underwent another reconstruction in 1907–1910.

H. F. B. Lynch, who visited Erivan in 1890s, wrote: "There is nothing very remarkable in the architecture of the mosque; but the floral paintings which adorn the ceiling of a companion and smaller edifice on the north side of the court are of very high merit." Luigi Villari, an Italian diplomat and historian, gave a detailed description of the mosque in his 1906 book titled Fire and Sword in the Caucasus. He wrote that the "great mosque called the Gok Djami [...] is a good deal more than a mosque; it is a long quadrangle containing several places of worship and a number of cells, schools, and offices of the Moslem religious administration. It is not very ancient [...] but it is handsome." The Encyclopædia Britannica (1911) described the mosque as the "finest building in the city." The minaret of the mosque, standing at 24 metres (79 ft) was the tallest structure in 19th-century Yerevan.

From the late 18th century, the mosque was home to a school (madrasa), which was the largest and most regularly operating of the mosque schools in Erivan. The German scholar August von Haxthausen, who visited the mosque in the 1840s, gave a description of the school:

In one of the halls, to the left of the mosque, we found a school assembled, consisting of about thirty boys, who sat in a row against the walls, all with their legs crossed under them; two teachers, in the same posture, sat facing them, one on each side; in the centre stood water-jugs, inkstands, etc. The boys were summoned two at a time to repeat their lessons […]. Although they are all Tatar children, the only language taught is Persian: in no case do they learn to read or write their own language. They have only manuscript books; the teachers read to them, until they become accustomed to the characters; the book generally used for this purpose is a Persian history of Nadir Shah. The process of teaching them to read and write in a language quite foreign to them is very tedious, sometimes occupying several years.

As Tadevos Hakobyan writes, the relatively poor conditions and educational methods described by Haxthausen were common to the schools attached to churches and mosques in Erivan in this period, which, in any case, were attended by only a small percentage of the city's children.

=== Soviet period ===
The Blue Mosque served as a Friday mosque for the Muslim population in Yerevan until the mid-1920s, when it ceased to operate as a religious institution. During the Soviet period, certain physical changes were made to the structure. Its entrances and exits were modified significantly. The main gate, on the southern side, to the right of the minaret was blocked. The western gate was "incorporated into a residence complex and became hardly recognizable as an entrance." The entrance on the northern side became the only entrance. It is accessible and visible from Mashtots Avenue.

Beginning with Alexander Tamanian's 1924 master plan for Yerevan, the mosque has been situated more than two meters below the street level, which requires visitors to descend a flight of steps. Its courtyard became a "creative space for Armenian artists, writers, poets, and intelligentsia, facilitating the production of a new cultural and aesthetic order for socialist Armenia. The courtyard was protected by large elm and plane trees, and in this way provided the hot and dusty city with a shaded refuge."

The courtyard housed a teahouse, which became a hub for intellectual gatherings. Yeghishe Charents, Martiros Saryan, Aksel Bakunts were among its regular visitors. Foreign guests included Armenian-American writer William Saroyan, Russian poet Osip Mandelstam, Russian novelist Andrei Bely and others. Local artists used the "courtyard for exhibitions and as a laboratory for new socialist spirituality." The mosque was preserved through the efforts of Armenian intellectuals, especially Charents. In 2026 the ceremonial hall of the mosque was named after Charents for his efforts to preserve the mosque and his interest in Iranian culture and literature.

In the 1930s, first the Anti-Religious Museum and subsequently the Museum of Anti-fascism were housed at the mosque. From 1936 until the collapse of the Soviet Union, the mosque housed the Museum of Natural Sciences, which included a planetarium inside the main prayer hall and the Yerevan History Museum.

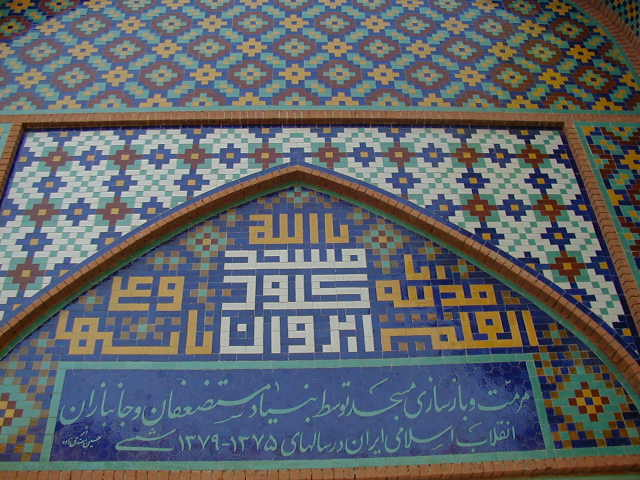
The main entrance of the mosque from Mashtots Avenue.

=== Independence period ===
In the late 1980s, during the Nagorno-Karabakh conflict, the mosque did not sustain any damages because it was considered to be Persian, not Azerbaijani, and housed the city's history museum.

In February 1991, a preliminary agreement was reached between the city's authorities and an Iranian delegation to restore the mosque. The mosque underwent major renovation between 1994 and 1998. The city's authorities officially transferred the right to use the mosque to Iran on October 13, 1995. The government of Iran allocated some 1 billion Iranian rials (over $1 million) for restoration works. Tehran selected the Mostazafan Foundation as the organization responsible for its restoration, with the Iranian-Armenian engineer Varoujan Arakelian overseeing the process. The mosque was re-opened as a religious institution in 1996. Brady Kiesling described the restoration as "structurally necessary but aesthetically ambiguous."

Another reconstruction was done between 2009 and 2011.

View of the interior.

==== Today ====
The Blue Mosque is the only active mosque in Armenia, which has a small Muslim population (between 812 and 1,000 or 0.03% of the total population).

Since restoration, it has become a religious and cultural center for the Iranians residing in Armenia and Iranian tourists visiting Armenia. In 2003 the journalist Thomas de Waal noted that the only regular worshippers at the mosque were "the dozen or so diplomats from the Iranian Embassy." Less than a decade later, in 2009, ArmeniaNow wrote that of the up to 2,000 Iranians residing in Yerevan as many as 500 periodically attend the mosque on Thursdays. The Iranian cultural center inside the mosque complex attracts young Armenians seeking to learn Persian. The Persian library of over 8,000 items, named after the poet Hafez, was opened inside the complex in October 2014.

On December 10, 2015, the government of Armenia leased the mosque complex to the embassy of Iran to Armenia for 99 years to use it as a cultural center.

Closer view of the dome

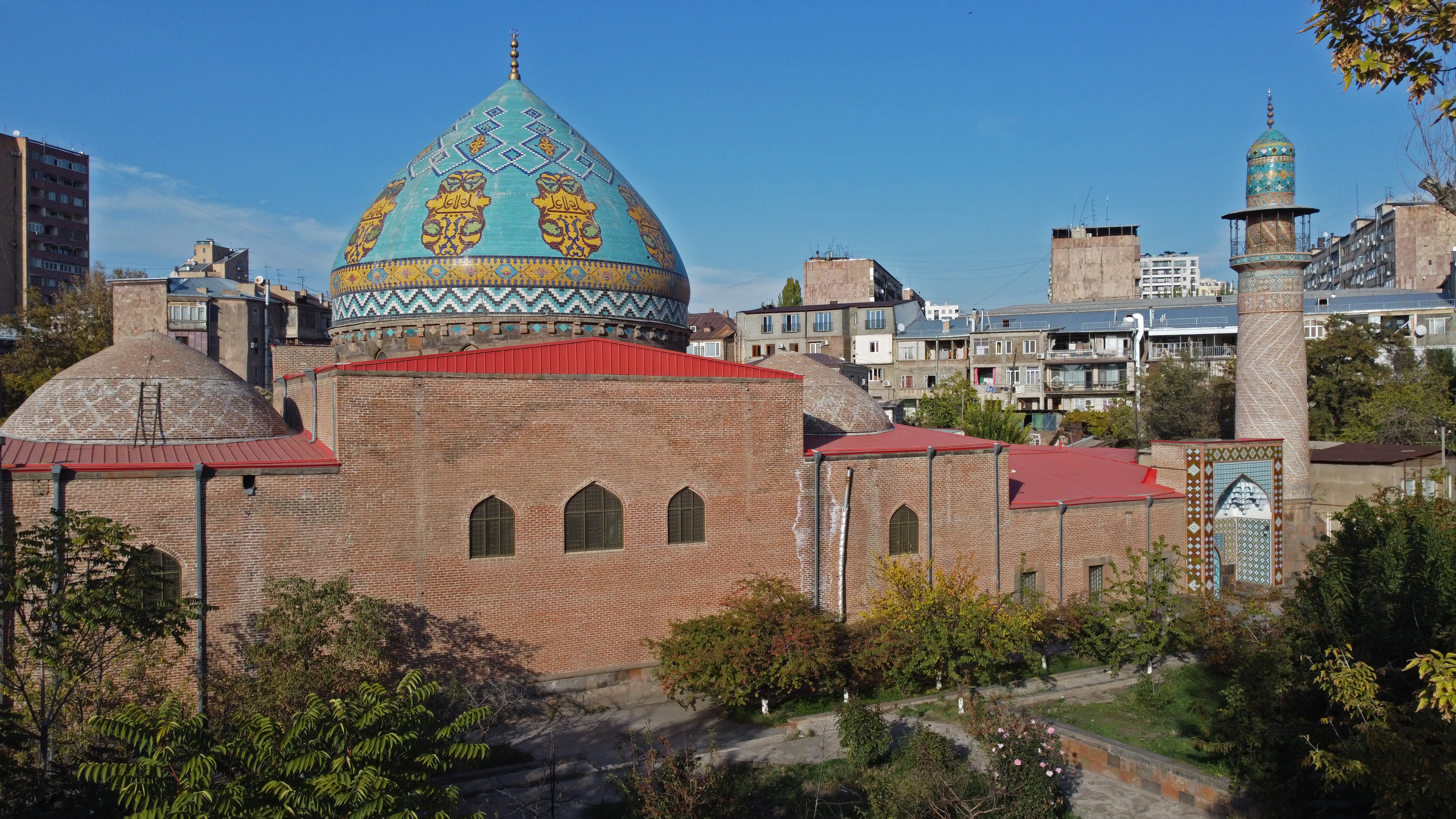
The dome and the minaret

The minaret

During the Twelve-Day War in June 2025, the U.S. embassy in Yerevan recommended U.S. citizens exercise increased caution and avoid locations with known Iranian government affiliation, including the Blue Mosque. Iranian President Masoud Pezeshkian visited and prayed at the mosque during his August 2025 visit to Armenia. In March 2026, a commemoration ceremony was held at the mosque honoring the "martyrdom" of the late Supreme Leader of Iran, Ayatollah Ali Khamenei. Iranian Vice President Hamid Pourmohammadi honored Iranian-Armenian composer and conductor Loris Tjeknavorian inside the mosque in November 2026 during the presentation of the Armenian translation of Ferdowsi's Shahnameh.

== Architecture ==
The mosque is listed by the Armenian government as a monument of national significance. It is "one of the oldest buildings in central Yerevan" and the "only extant building of the Iranian period in Yerevan." The historian of Islamic art Markus Ritter described it as the "main model for the early Qajar mosque architecture of the Iranian period." The mosque complex covers an area of 7,000 square metres (75,000 sq ft). The mosque itself is 97 by 66 metres (318 ft × 217 ft), while the courtyard is 70 by 47 metres (230 ft × 154 ft). Its dome design, tile patterns, brickwork and color scheme, and the layout of the main prayer area set it apart from both Sunni and Ottoman mosques. The mosque contains the traditional Shia attributes, including a minaret, three mihrabs (prayer halls), holy inscriptions, etc.

The building demonstrates a noticeable connection to Iranian architectural traditions, especially with its façade design. Its continuous and refined façade, united by a double arcade, reflects the characteristics of early Qajar mosques, including the Dar ul-Ihsan Mosque at Sanandaj, the Jameh Mosque at Qom, and the Sardar Mosque and School at Qazvin. The mosque includes 24 arched cells that face the pool in the middle of the courtyard, which is surrounded by a rose garden. The minaret, standing at 24 metres (79 ft) tall, has a 7-degree slope, but is considered to be architecturally safe.

== Efforts to list as a World Heritage Site ==
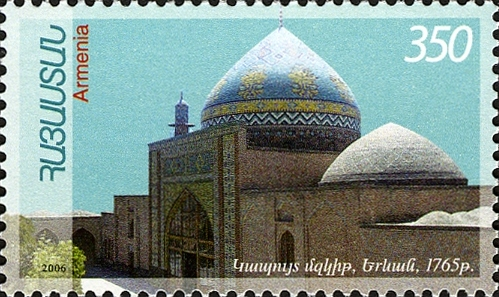
A 2007 Armenian stamp depicting the mosque.

In October 2007, the Armenian minister of foreign affairs Vartan Oskanian stated during his speech at the 34th session of the UNESCO General Conference in Paris that the Blue Mosque and other sites are on the waiting list for inclusion in the UNESCO World Heritage List. In January 2013 Armenian minister of culture Hasmik Poghosyan stated that Armenia will take all possible steps for inclusion of the mosque in the list. She reaffirmed this position in a meeting with the Iranian culture minister Mohammad Hosseini in April 2013. Hosseini stated that he hoped Armenian efforts would succeed. In his speech at the 38th session of UNESCO General Conference in November 2015, Armenia's foreign affairs minister Eduard Nalbandyan said:

...neighboring Iran has made great efforts to preserve and protect the Armenian cultural heritage. The Armenian Monastic Ensembles of Iran, the oldest of which dates back to the 7th century, were inscribed on the World Heritage List by the Iranian Government. On our part, Armenia reconstructed the Iranian 18th century Blue Mosque in Yerevan, and is going to inscribe it on the World Heritage List.

On October 15, 2015, Armenian prime minister Hovik Abrahamyan and First Vice President of Iran Eshaq Jahangiri attended an event dedicated to the 250th anniversary of the mosque. Abrahamyan stated in his speech that both Armenia and Iran "are now making efforts to have it put on the UNESCO World Heritage list."

== In politics ==
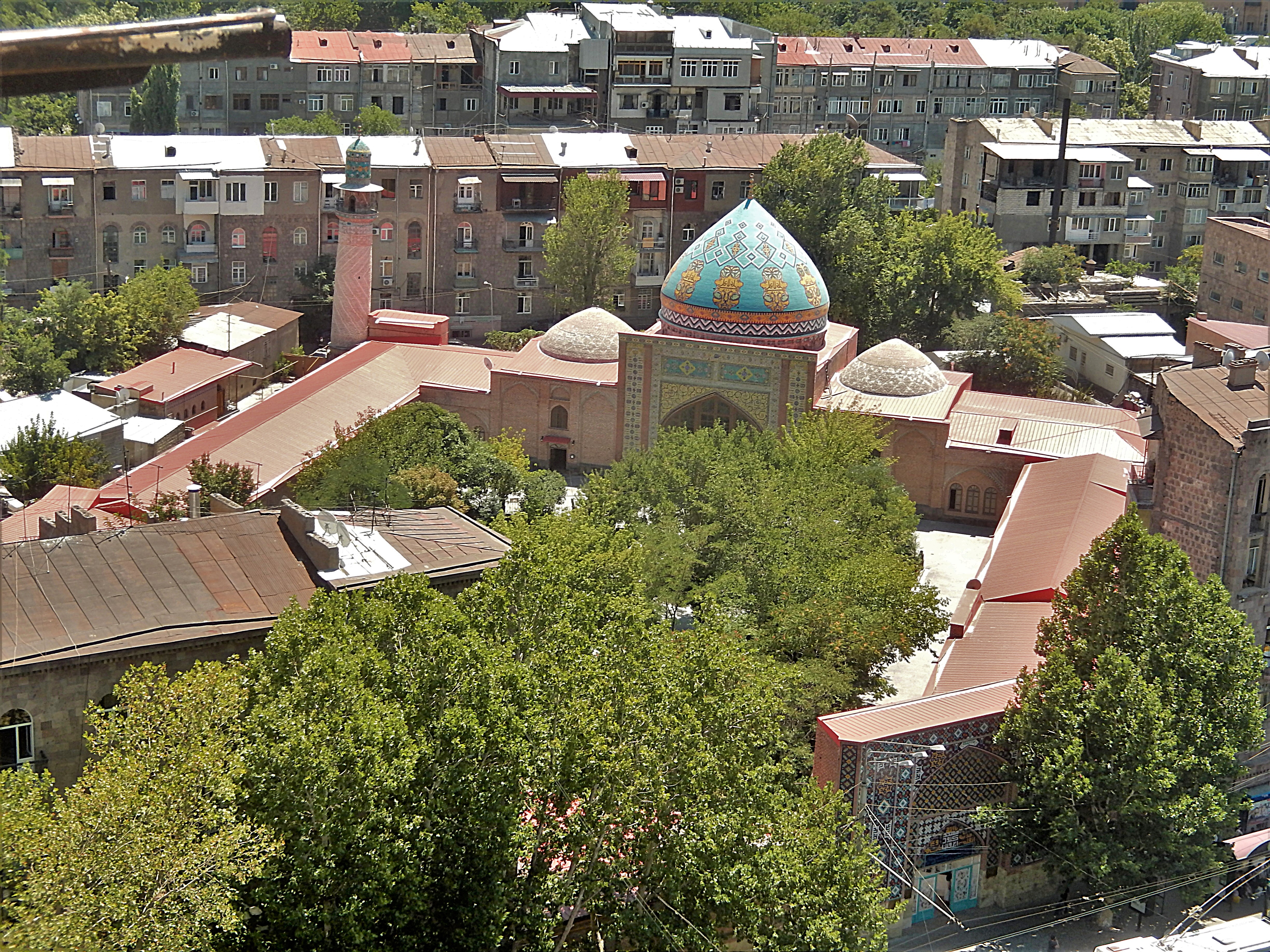
An aerial view

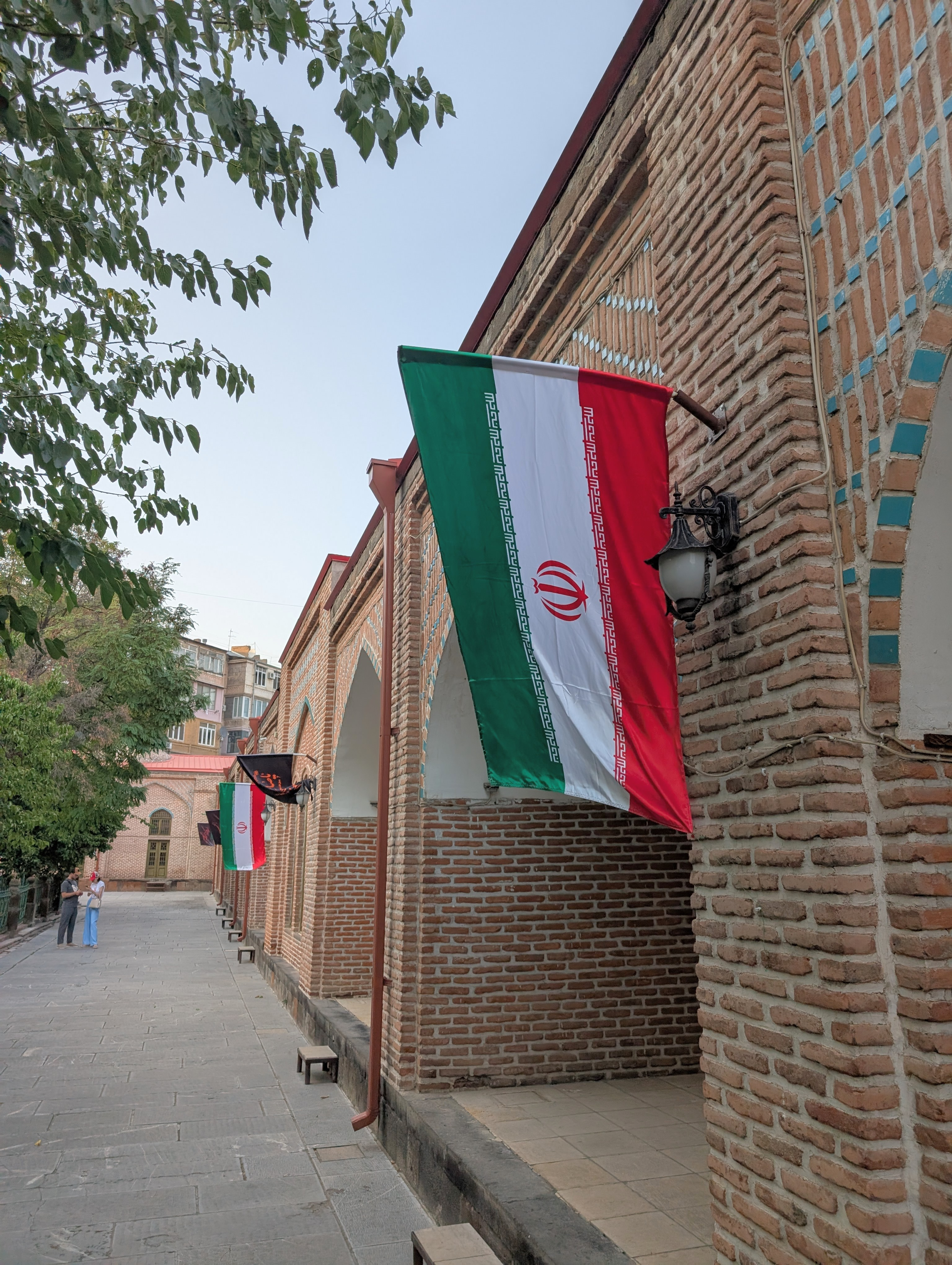
An Iranian flag inside the mosque

Multiple Western and Armenian sources describe the mosque as Iranian/Persian. (Note: For instance, Armenpress, the state news agency, calls it the "Iranian Blue Mosque of Yerevan" in a 2013 article.) The anthropologist and ethnographer Tsypylma Darieva notes that "in local media and in official discourses, the Blue Mosque has been strongly associated with the new expatriate political body symbolizing the recent Armenian–Iranian friendship. This dominant reading of the place defines the Blue Mosque exclusively as the 'Persian Mosque'."

In Azerbaijan, the mosque is usually referred to as a monument of Azerbaijani heritage of Yerevan. One government official called it "the largest religious center of Azerbaijanis living in Yerevan." A 2007 book titled War against Azerbaijan: Targeting Cultural Heritage, published by the Ministry of Foreign Affairs of Azerbaijan and the Heydar Aliyev Foundation, objected to the restoration of the mosque in the 1990s and to its "presentation as a Persian mosque." The Blue Mosque is given an exclusive Azerbaijani character by the official Azerbaijani discourse, which is spread through speeches, news and media sources, and scholarly works. Some Azerbaijani sources anachronistically equate the modern Azerbaijani nation with the ethnically diverse population of the Erivan Khanate in the 19th century. In Azerbaijan, the Heydar Aliyev Foundation has heavily funded efforts to alter historical facts in order to shape the views of Azerbaijani citizens.

The independent Armenian scholar Rouben Galichian argues in his 2009 book Invention of History:

It must be said that all mosques built [in Yerevan] between the 1635 and 1820s were erected by the Iranians and bearing in mind that the local Muslim population, as well as the Persians were both Shias, their mosques were identical. Hence, it is very difficult to understand how the Blue Mosque could be an “Azeri” mosque, since such a classification did not exist.

At a 2022 forum, Armenian prime minister Nikol Pashinyan stated: "We have great respect for Islamic civilization and religion, and one of the clearest proofs of this is the Blue Mosque in the center of Yerevan, which, by the way, was restored during the period of Armenia’s independence." At the 2023 Munich Security Conference, Pashinyan, in response to Ilham Aliyev's accusation that Armenia destroyed mosques in Nagorno-Karabakh, stated that Armenia has a "Muslim minority in our country, and we have a functioning mosque."

=== Visit of Azerbaijani MPs ===
In February 2022 two Azerbaijani pro-government MPs, Tahir Mirkişili and Soltan Məmmədov, attending a Euronest Parliamentary Assembly meeting in Yerevan, visited the mosque. Mirkişili wrote that "Although there are inscriptions related to another state on its walls, its architecture, walls, and spirit as a whole are affiliated with Azerbaijan. We believe that its true owners will soon be able to offer their prayers in the mosque." The Iranian embassy in Armenia responded by calling the mosque a "symbol of Iranian art" and noting that "centuries-old Persian epigraphy has been preserved" on its walls. Mahmoud Movahedifar, an Iranian clergyman serving at the mosque, stated that it has distinctive features of Iran's traditional Islamic architecture and that all inscriptions are in Persian. Movahedifar added, "Even if there was a single tile here with an Azerbaijani inscription we would recognize that fact."

== Artistic depictions ==
The mosque has been depicting in paintings by Grigory Gagarin (d. 1893), Panos Terlemezian (1917), Sargis Hovhannisian (1921), Aleksei Ilyich Kravchenko (1934).

== See also ==
- Islam in Armenia
- List of mosques in Armenia
- Iranian Armenia

== Bibliography ==
- Darieva, Tsypylma (2016). "Prayer house or cultural centre? Restoring a mosque in post-socialist Armenia". Central Asian Survey. 35 (2). Routledge: 292–308. doi:10.1080/02634937.2016.1140374. S2CID 147672093.
- de Waal, Thomas (2003). Black Garden: Armenia and Azerbaijan Through Peace and War. New York: New York University Press. ISBN 978-0-8147-1945-9.
- Hakobyan, T. (1971). Erevani patmutʻyuně (1500—1800 tʻtʻ.) Երևանի պատմությունը (1500—1800 թթ.) [History of Yerevan (1500–1800)] (in Armenian). Erevani hamalsarani hratarakchʻutʻyun. OCLC 582481141.
- Haxthausen, August von (1854). Transcaucasia: Sketches of the Nations and Races between the Black Sea and the Caspian. London: Chapman and Hall.
- Kouhi-Esfahani, Marzieh (2019). Iran's Foreign Policy in the South Caucasus Relations with Azerbaijan and Armenia. Routledge. ISBN 978-1138309081.
- Lynch, H. F. B. (1901). Armenia, travels and studies. Volume I: The Russian Provinces. London: Longmans, Green, and Co. pp. 213-215.
- Markossian, Nara (April 2002). "Islam in Armenia: Restored Blue Mosque Serves Yerevan's Growing Iranian Community". Armenian International Magazine. 13 (3). Glendale, California: 44-45. ISSN 1050-3471.
- Mozaffari, Ali; Akbar, Ali (2024). "Heritage conservation and civilisational competition in the South Caucasus: the Blue Mosque of Yerevan and the Govhar Agha Mosque in Shusha". International Journal of Heritage Studies. 30 (12). Taylor & Francis: 1393–1422. doi:10.1080/13527258.2024.2393612.
- Ritter, Markus (2009). "The Lost Mosque(s) in the Citadel of Qajar Yerevan: Architecture and Identity, Iranian and Local Traditions in the Early 19th Century". Iran and the Caucasus. 13 (2): 239–279. JSTOR 25703805.
- Villari, Luigi (1906). "The Land of Ararat". Fire and Sword in the Caucasus. London: T. Fisher Unwin.
