= Victory Bridge =

Victory Bridge may refer to:

- Victory Bridge (Yerevan), in Yerevan, Armenia
- Victory Bridge (New Jersey), in Middlesex County, New Jersey
- Victory Bridge (Florida), in Sneads, Florida
- Veresk Bridge, which was known in World War II as the "Bridge of Victory"
