= Nairi Cinema =

Cinema in Yervan,Armenia

Coordinates: 40°11′21″N 44°31′06″E

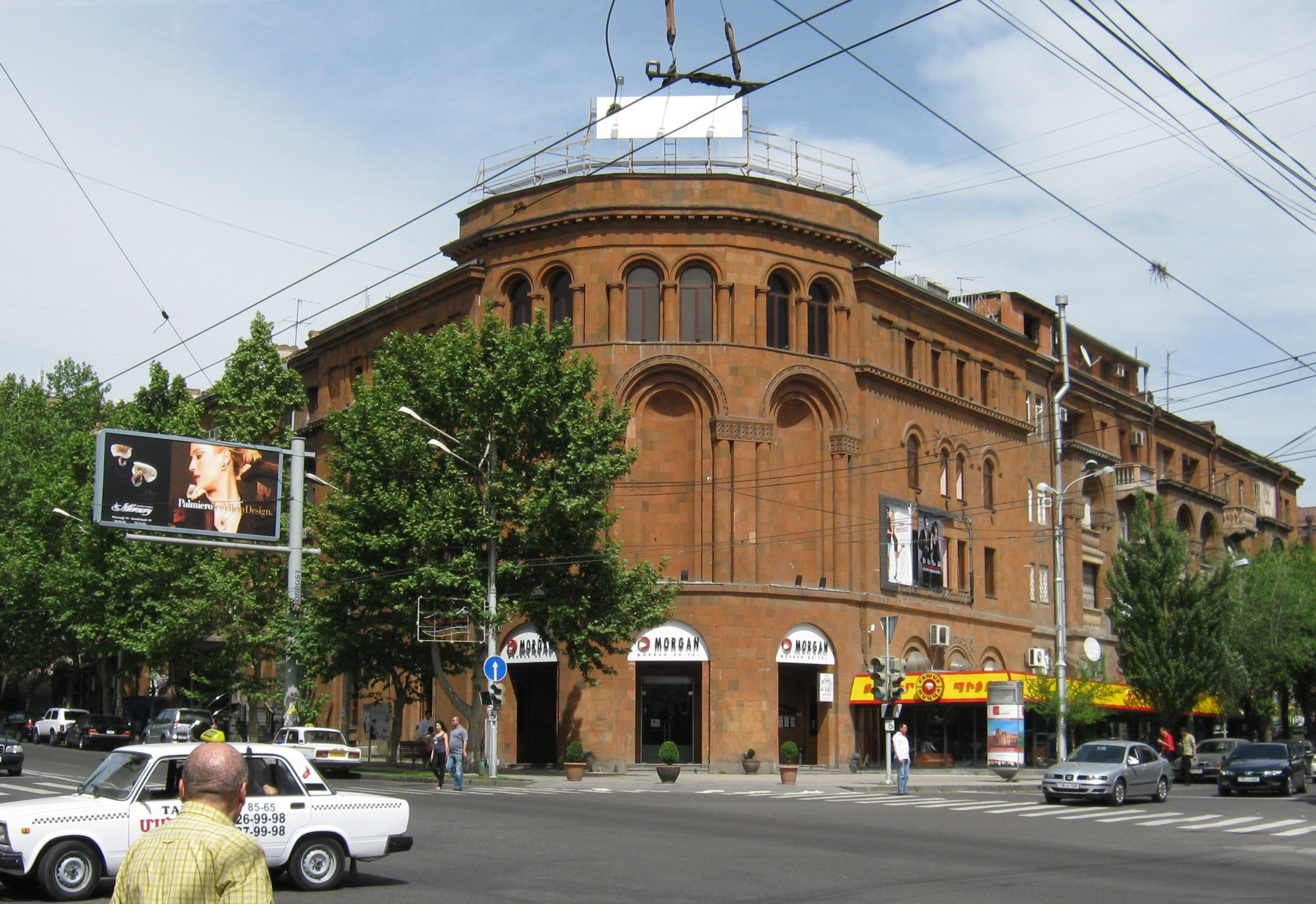
- Nairi Cinema
- Interactive map of Nairi Cinema
- Location: Mashtots Avenue; Yerevan, Armenia
- Seating type: Reserved
- Type: Indoor theatre

Construction
- Opened: 1920; 1954 (reopened)

Website
- http://nairicinema.am/

Nairi Cinema (Armenian: Նաիրի կինոթատրոն (Nairi kinotatron)), is the second-largest cinema hall in the Armenian capital of Yerevan, located on the intersection of Mashtots Avenue with the Isahakyan street at the central Kentron District. After being closed for a while, it reopened in 2026.

== History ==
Opened in 1920, Nairi Cinema is the oldest movie theatre in Yerevan. The original building was located on Amiryan street until the 1950s when it was moved to the current building on Mahstots Avenue. The first ever produced Soviet-Armenian movie Zaré was shown in the cinema in 1926.

The current building of the cinema was constructed between 1952 and 1954 and consists of two halls. It was designed by architect Gevorg Tamanian, the son of Alexander Tamanian.

The Nairi Cinema was reopened to the public in 2026.

== See also ==
- Armenian National Cinematheque
- Cinema of Armenia
