= Jameh Mosque of Qom =

Mosque in Qom, Iran; Iranian national heritage site

Jāmeh Mosque of Qom
- مسجد جامع قم
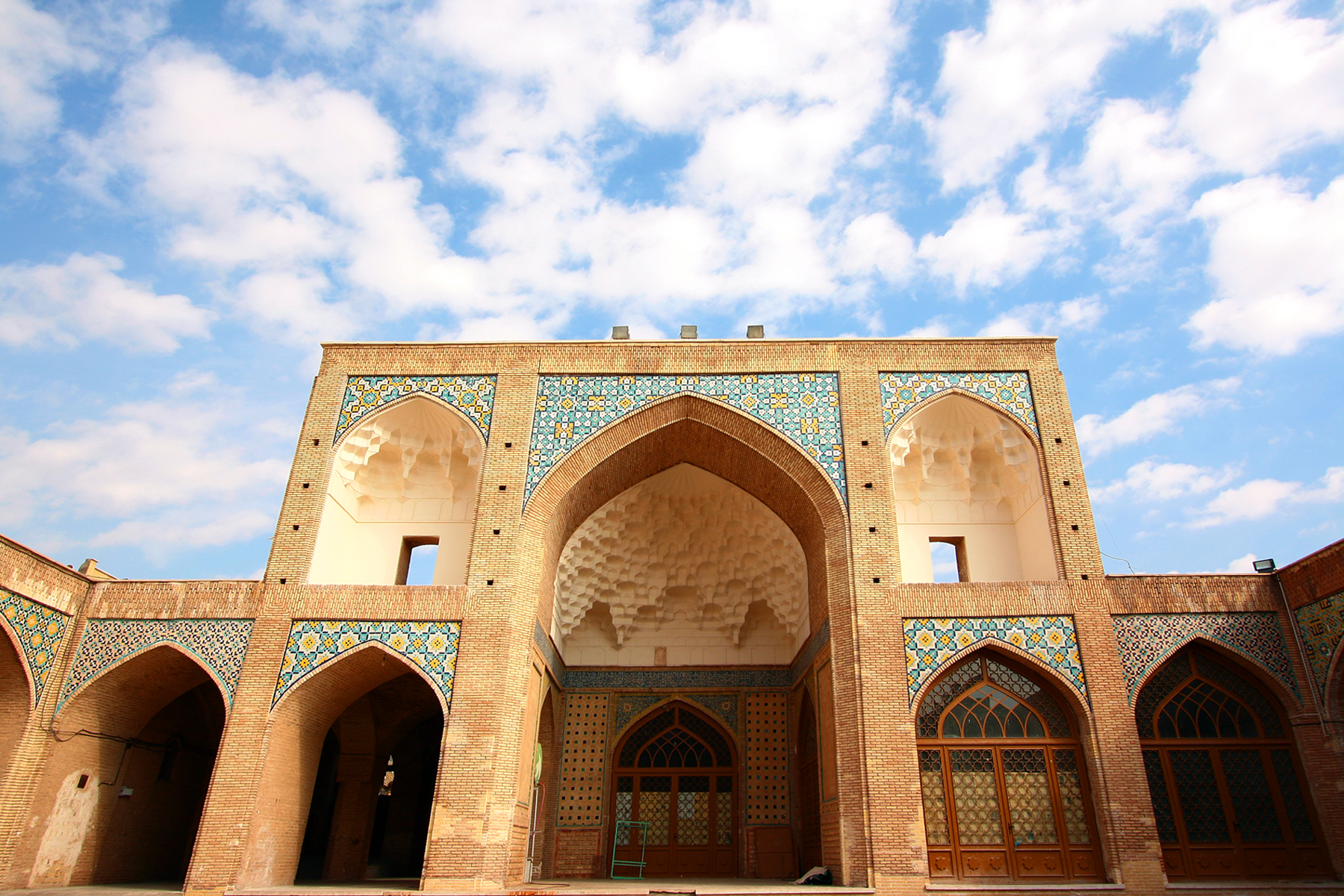
- The mosque iwan in 2009

- Location of the mosque in Iran

Religion
- Affiliation: Shia Islam
- Ecclesiastical or organisational status: Friday mosque
- Status: Active

Location
- Location: Qom, Qom Province
- Country: Iran
- Coordinates: 28°44′52″N 54°32′32″E

Architecture
- Type: Mosque architecture
- Style: Seljuk; Safavid; Qajar
- Founder: Jani Khan (attrib.)
- Completed: 529 AH (1134/1135 CE)

Specifications
- Interior area: 6,000 m^{2} (65,000 sq ft)
- Dome: One
- Materials: Mudbricks

Iran National Heritage List
- Official name: Friday Mosque of Qom
- Type: Friday Mosque
- Designated: 1933
- Reference no.: 194
- Conservation organization: Cultural Heritage, Handicrafts and Tourism Organization of Iran

The Jāmeh Mosque of Qom (Persian: مسجد جامع قم), also known as the Atiq Jameh Mosque of Qom, is a Shi'ite Friday mosque (jāmeh), located in the downtown area of the city of Qom, in the province of Qom, Iran. It is one of the oldest mosques in Qom.

The mosque was added to the Iran National Heritage List on 31 July 1933, administered by the Cultural Heritage, Handicrafts and Tourism Organization of Iran.

== Overview ==
The mosque was constructed on a rectangular plan. The main skeleton of the dome was commenced in the early-to-mid-6th century CE and ranks second in antiquity to the Imam Hasan al-Askari Mosque. Completed in 529 AH (1134/1135 CE), the dome's tall south facing porch and colored encrustation of plasterwork is from the Safavid period. The construction of the northern porch and nocturnal areas in an east–west direction are from the Qajar era.

No iron was used in the building of the 6,000-square-metre (65,000 sq ft) mosque and its dome that is standing after many years. The mosque consists of an old Maqsurah and dome, an old porch with two squinches and three prayer halls, one basement, iwan, sahn and the entrance gate.

== Gallery ==
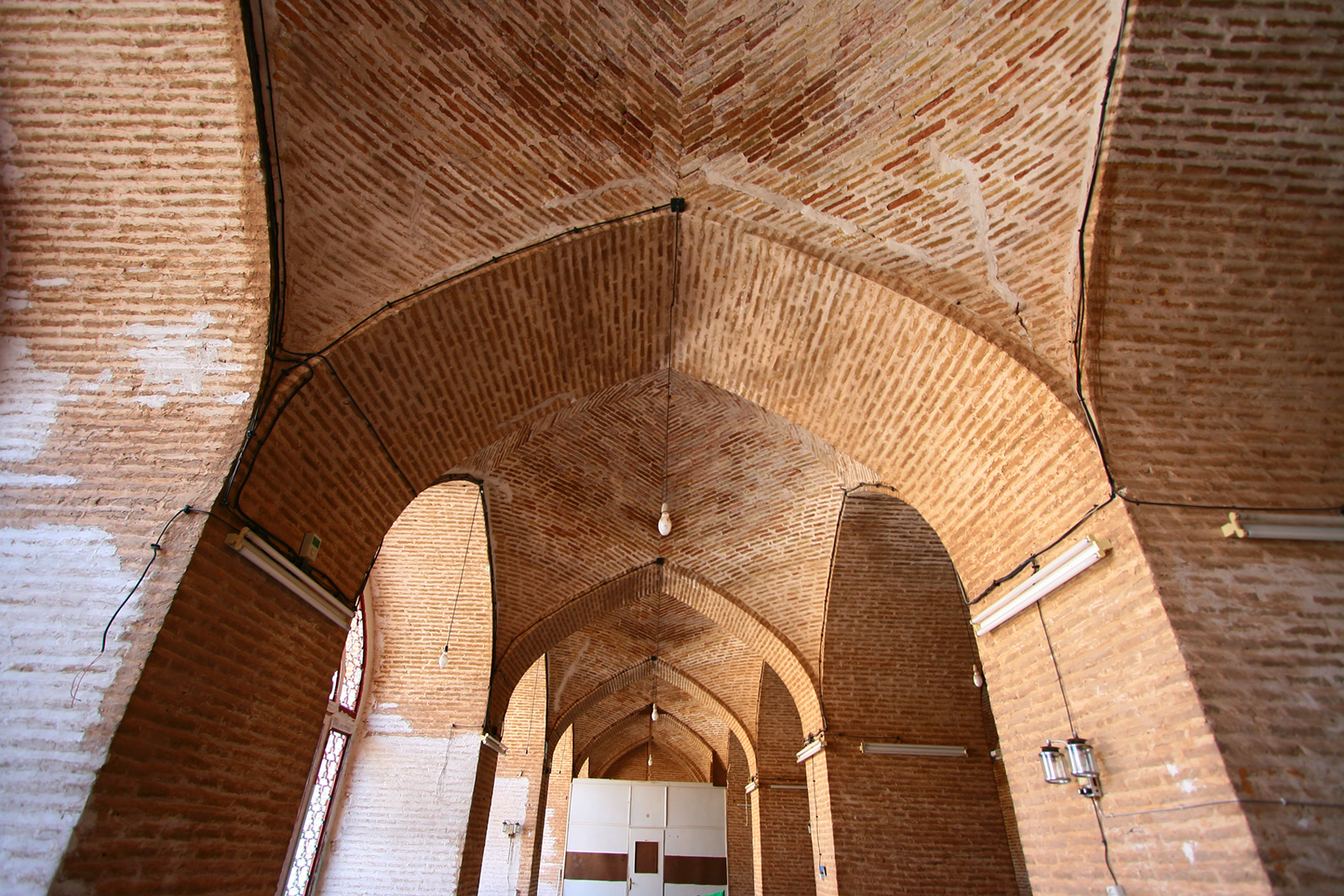

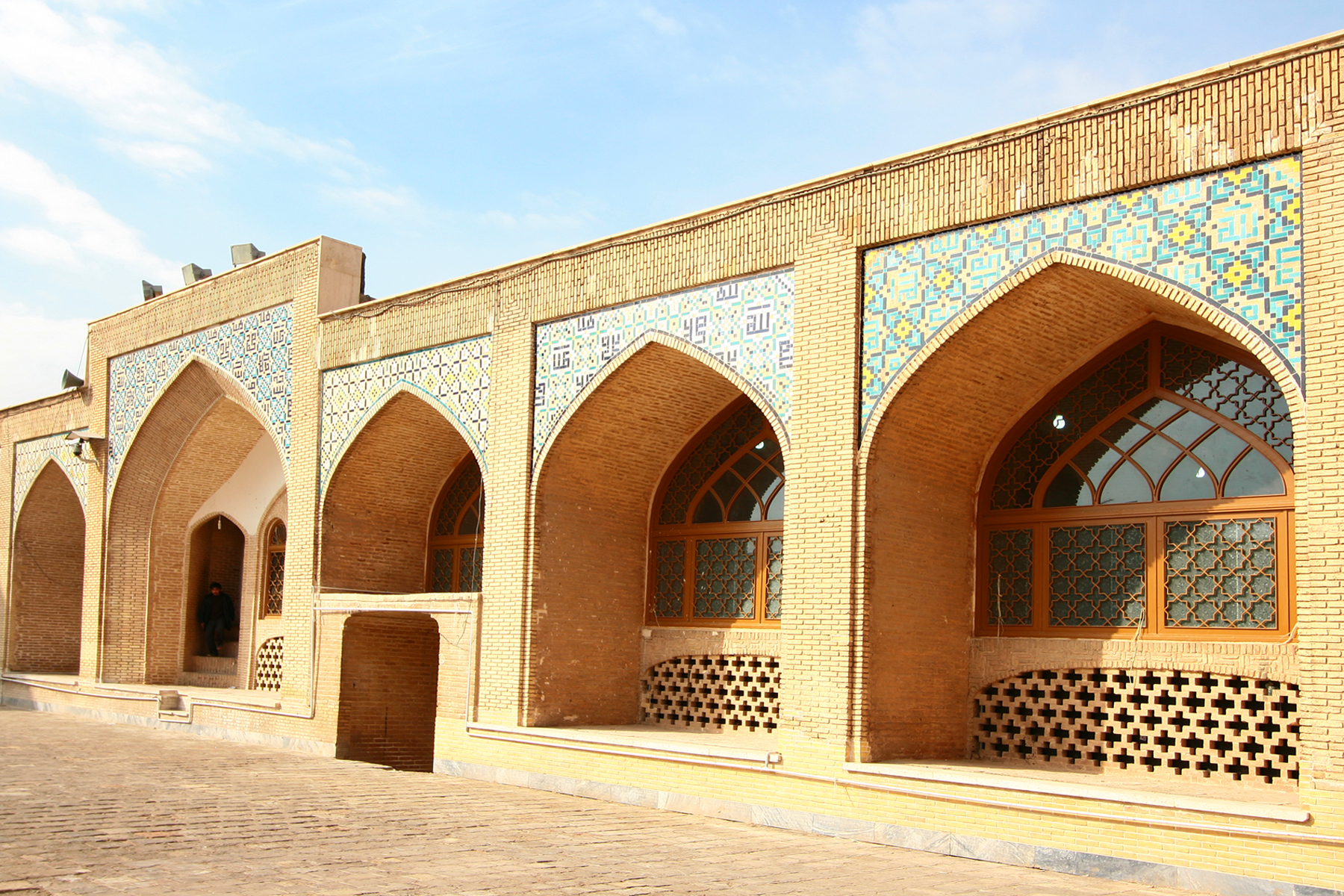

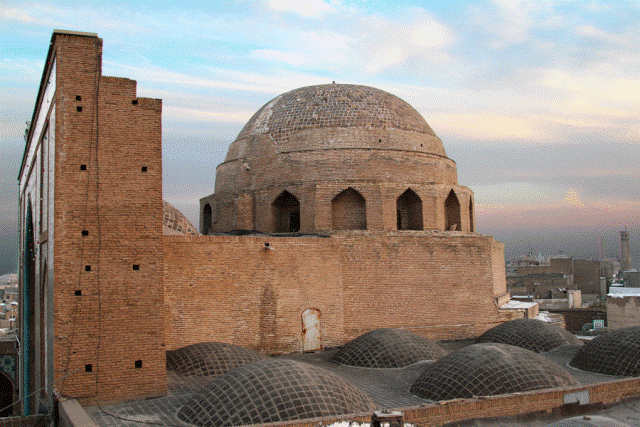

== See also ==
- Shia Islam in Iran
- List of mosques in Iran
- List of oldest mosques in Iran
