= Mashtots Avenue =

Street in Yerevan, Armenia

Coordinates: 40°10′57″N 44°30′35″E

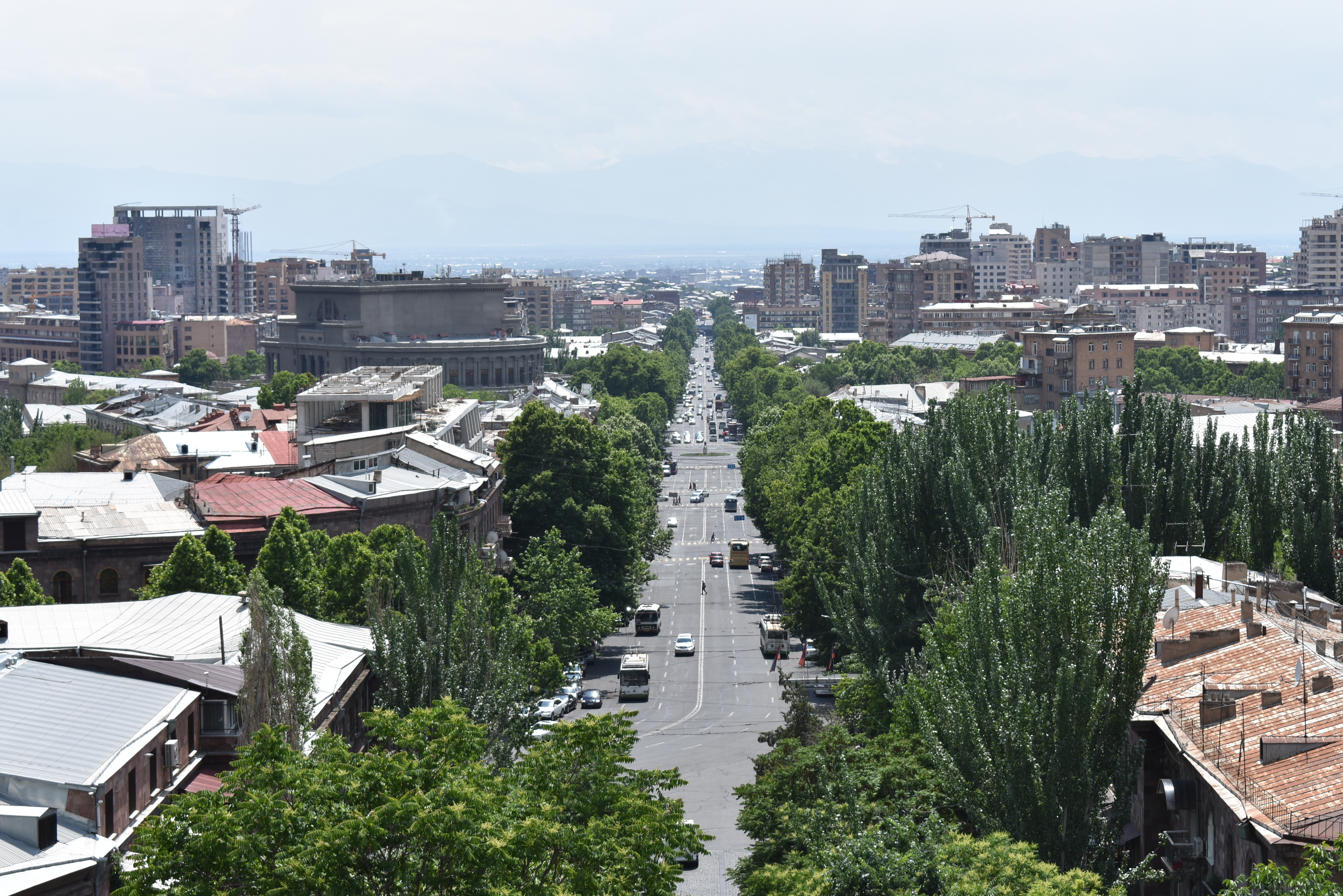
- Mashtots Avenue in 2018 as seen from the Matenadaran
- Interactive map of Mashtots Avenue
- Former name: Lenin Avenue (1924–1990)
- Length: 2.6 km (1.6 mi)
- Location: Kentron district, Yerevan Armenia

Construction
- Inauguration: 1924

Mashtots Avenue (Armenian: Մաշտոցի Պողոտա Mashtots'i Poghota), known as Lenin Avenue until 1990, is an avenue in the central Kentron district of Yerevan, Armenia.

The avenue starts with the Victory Bridge at the south and ends up with the Matenadaran museum to the north.

== Notable buildings ==
Many prominent buildings in the city of Yerevan are located on the Mashtots Avenue. Below is a list of significant structures located on the avenue (from north to south):

- Blue Mosque (1768)
- Eduard Isabekyan Gallery (2007)
- Yerevan Opera Theater (1933)
- Nairi Cinema (1954)
- Matenadaran (1959)
- President's Residence (1985)
- Yerevan State Marionettes Theatre (1987)

== Gallery ==
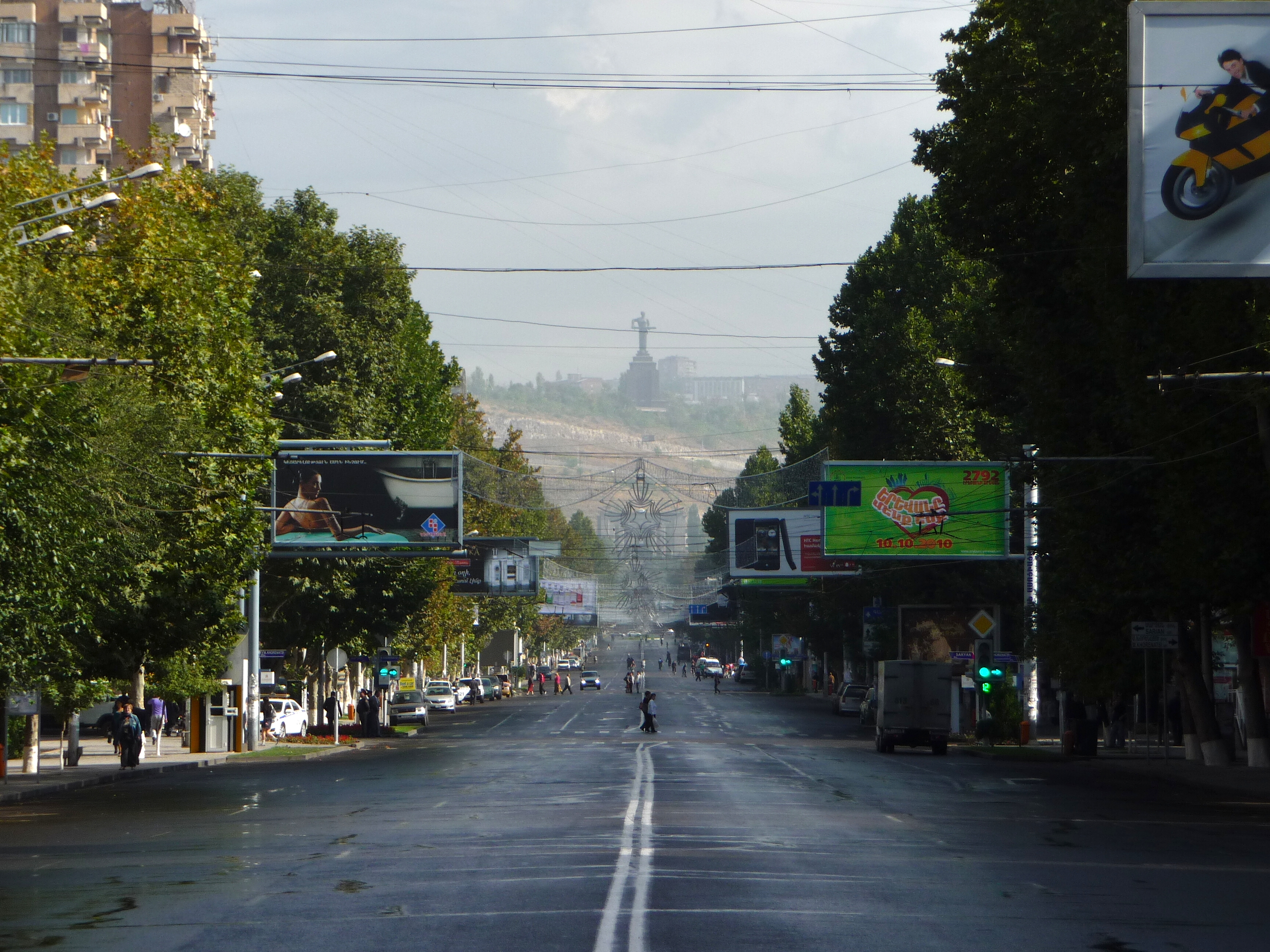
Mashtots Avenue from south to north

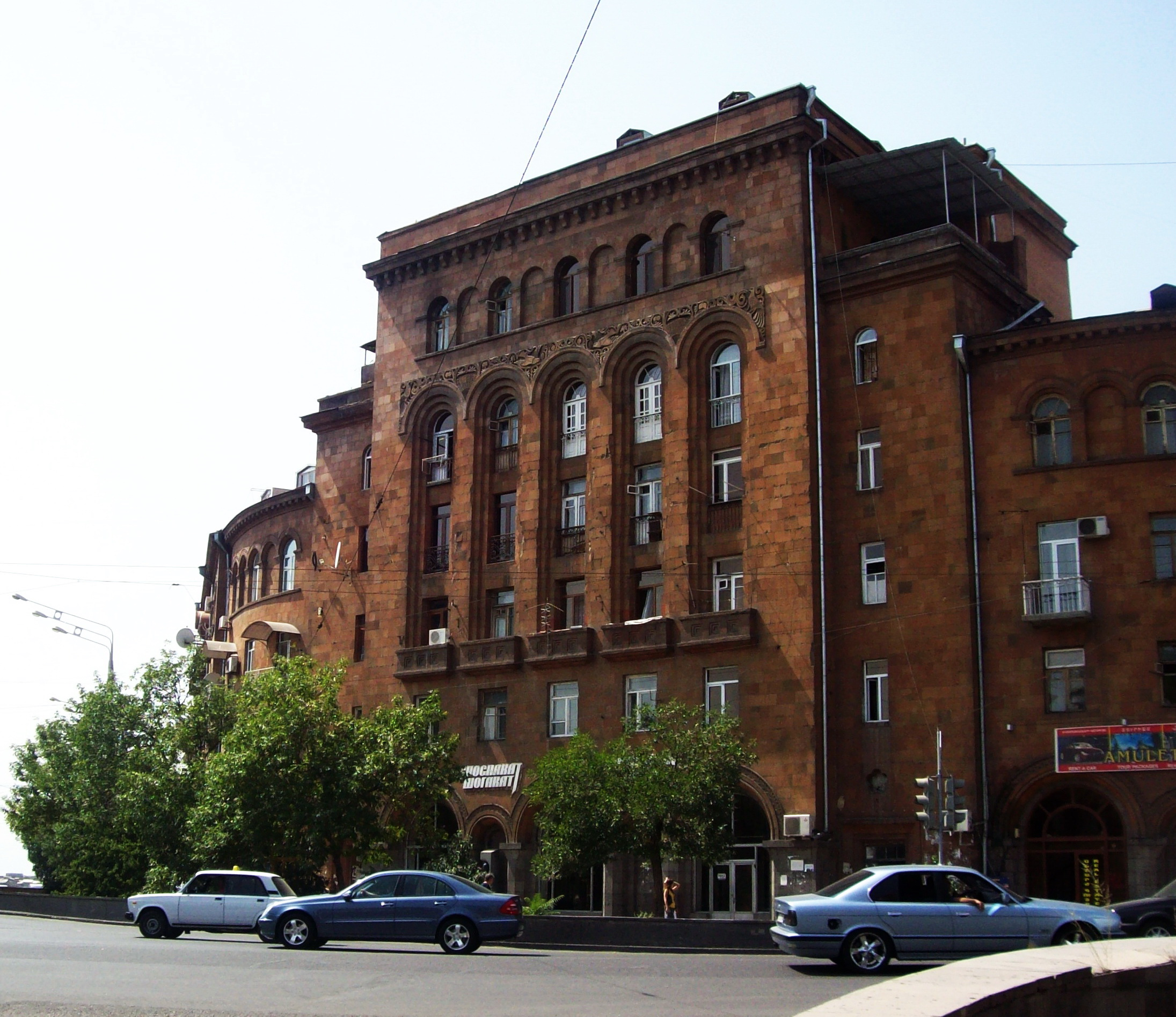
Residential building on the avenue

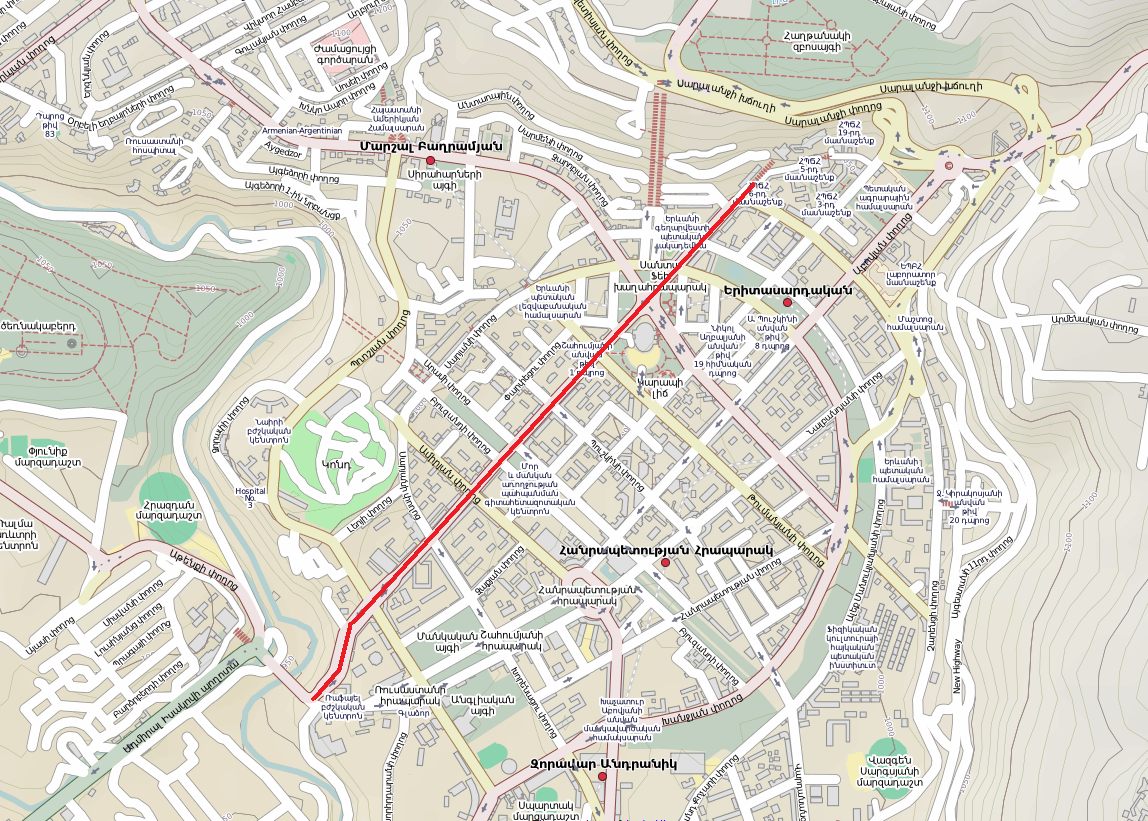
map

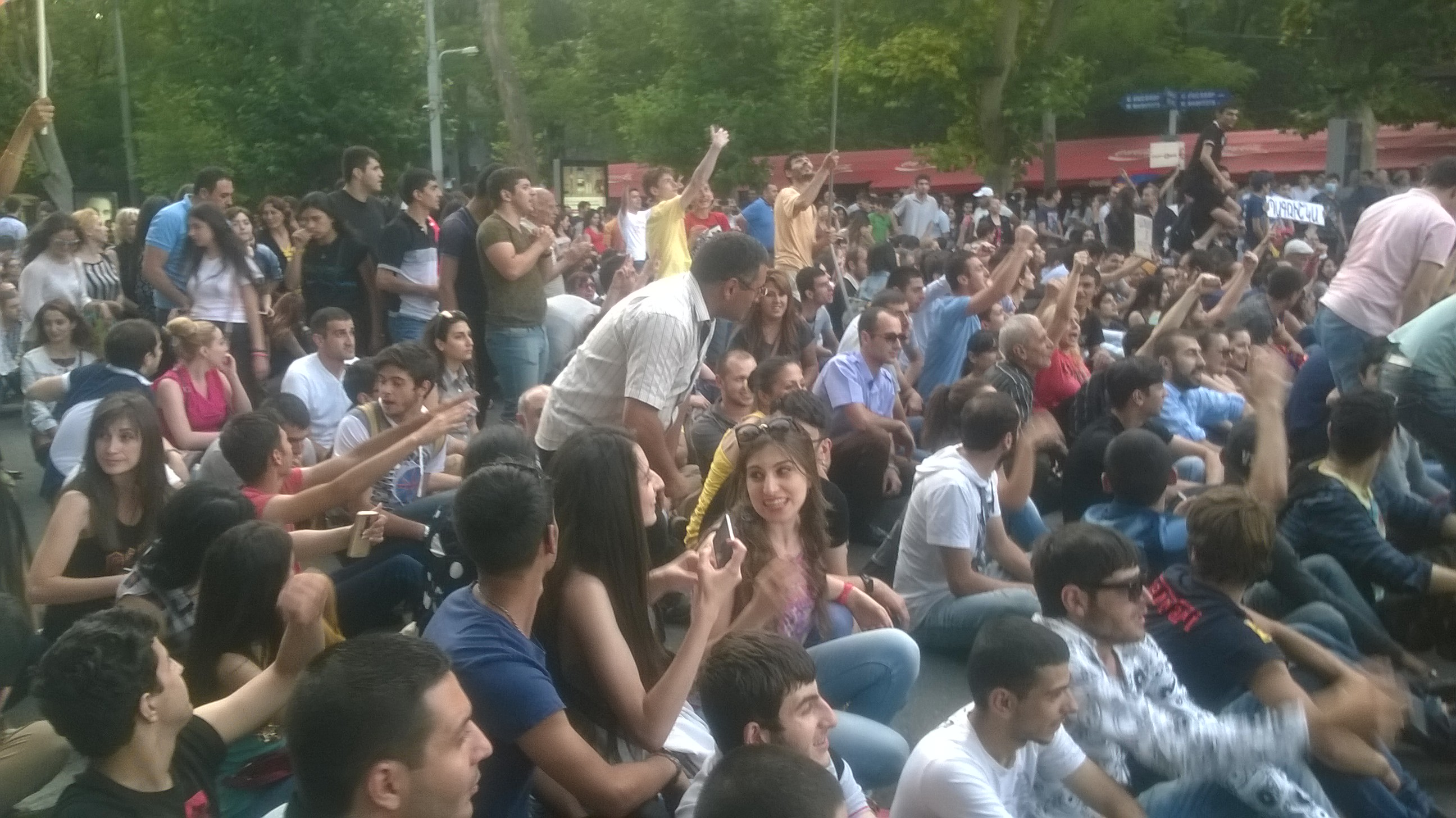
In Rally and Sit-in against the approved rise in electricity tariffs, June 26, 2015.
