= Tsypylma Darieva =

Russian anthropologist and ethnographer (born 1967)

- Born: 1967 (age 57–58) Ulan-Ude

Tsypylma Darieva (Russian: Цыпылма Дариева; born 1967) is an anthropologist and ethnographer. Her research is focused on anthropology of migration, transnational diaspora, homecoming, collective memory, public places, post-socialist urbanism, cosmopolitan sociability, sacred places, South Caucasus, Europe, and Central Asia.

Darieva was born in Ulan-Ude, the capital of Buryatia. She graduated from the Leningrad State University in 1989 with a bachelor's degree in Oriental Studies and from the Free University Berlin with a master's degree in social anthropology in 1996. She received her doctorate from the Humboldt University Berlin in 2002.

== Publications ==
- Darieva, Tsypylma. "Rethinking homecoming: Diasporic cosmopolitanism in post-Soviet Armenia." Ethnic and Racial Studies 34, no. 3 (2011): 490-508.
- Darieva, Tsypylma, and Wolfgang Kaschuba. Urban spaces after socialism: Ethnographies of public places in Eurasian cities. Vol. 22. Campus Verlag, 2011.
- Darieva, Tsypylma. "Between long-distance nationalism and ‘rooted’cosmopolitanism? Armenian-American engagement with their homeland." In East European Diasporas, Migration and Cosmopolitanism, pp. 38–53. Routledge, 2012.
- Darieva, Tsypylma. "Prayer house or cultural centre? Restoring a mosque in post-socialist Armenia. Central Asian Survey 35, no. 2 (2016): 292-308.
