= Imam Hasan al-Askari Mosque =

Twelver Shi'ite mosque in Qom, Iran

- مسجد امام حسن عسگری
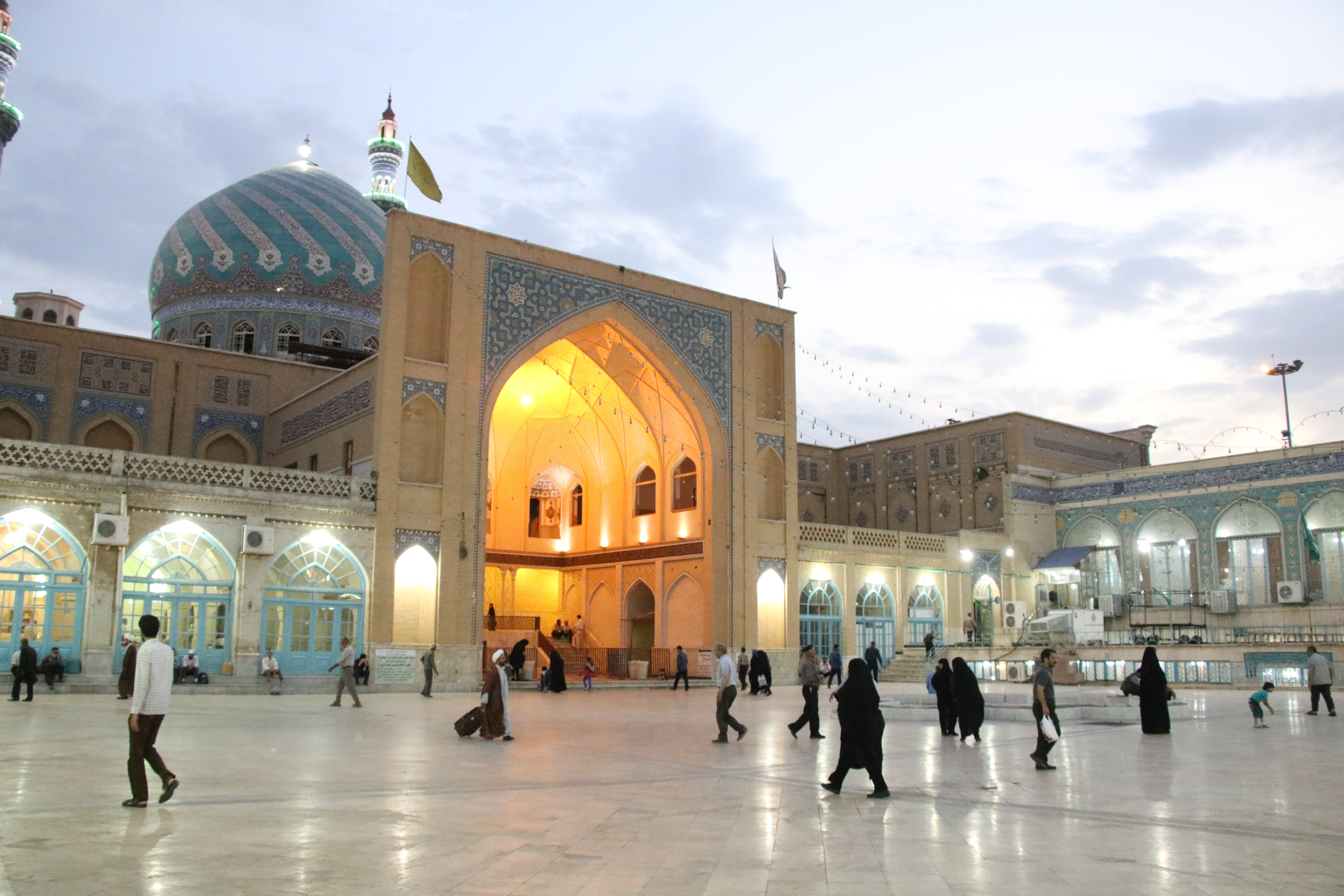
- The mosque in 2015

- Location of the mosque in Iran

Religion
- Affiliation: Shia (Twelver)
- Ecclesiastical or organizational status: Mosque and mausoleum
- Status: Active

Location
- Location: Qom, Qom Province
- Country: Iran
- Interactive map of Imam Hasan al-Askari Mosque
- Coordinates: 34°38′44″N 50°53′01″E

Architecture
- Type: Mosque architecture
- Style: Safavid (9th century); Contemporary Persian (21st century)
- Founder: Ahmad ibn Ishaq Ash'ari Qomi
- Completed: 9th century; 2015 (present structure)

Specifications
- Dome: One
- Dome height (inner): 35 m (115 ft)
- Minaret: Two
- Minaret height: 59 m (194 ft)

Iran National Heritage List
- Official name: Imam Hasan al-Askari Mosque
- Type: Built
- Designated: 9 January 1978
- Reference no.: 1312
- Conservation organization: Cultural Heritage, Handicrafts and Tourism Organization of Iran

The Imam Hasan al-Askari Mosque (Persian: مسجد امام حسن عسگری, romanized: Masjed-e Emam Hasan-e Asgari; Arabic: مسجد الإمام الحسن العسكري), also known as the Imam Hassan Al-Asgari Mosque or simply, the Al-Askari Mosque, is a Twelver Shi'ite mosque and mausoleum, located in the city of Qom, in the province of Qom, Iran. It is named for Hasan al-Askari, who was the 11th Imam of the Ahlulbayt and the father of the 12th Imam in Shi'ite traditions.

The original 9th-century structure, since renovated and expanded, is one of the oldest mosques in Iran. The mosque was added to the Iran National Heritage List on 9 January 1978, administered by the Cultural Heritage, Handicrafts and Tourism Organization of Iran.

== History ==
The mosque was built in the 9th century CE by Ahmad ibn Ishaq Ash'ari Qomi, an Ash'ari theologian and Shi'ite narrator of hadith. As centuries progressed, the mosque was gradually rebuilt and renovated into a larger form. The Safavids renovated the mosque in 1717, but the only trace of this renovation is the southern loggia of the mosque. During the Qajar era, a basement and a hall was built in the western side of the mosque in 1869. Nine years later, a hall and a basement were added in the western corner of the mosque. After the end of the Iranian Revolution, a new reconstruction plan was developed by Mohammad-Reza Golpaygani, and was re-opened in 2015.

=== Mausoleum ===
On the south side of the entrance, there is a tomb a notable personality named "Haji Ali al-Naqi", an elderly cleric who assisted in some of the renovation works during the Qajar era. Before the reconstruction, his tomb was in an old mausoleum with four arches.

== Gallery ==
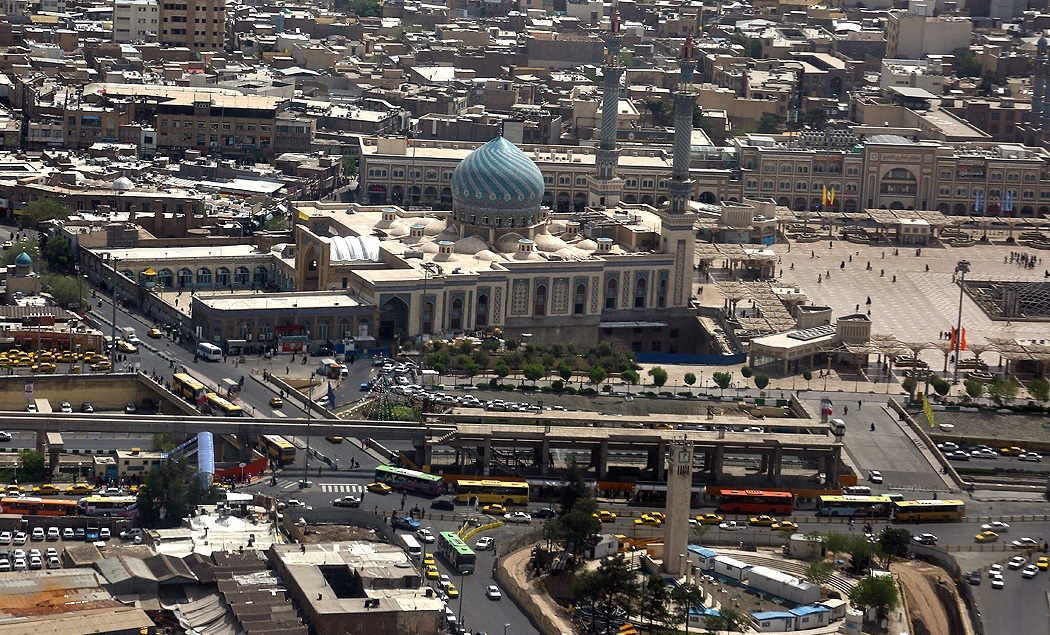
Aerial photograph of the mosque from 2018

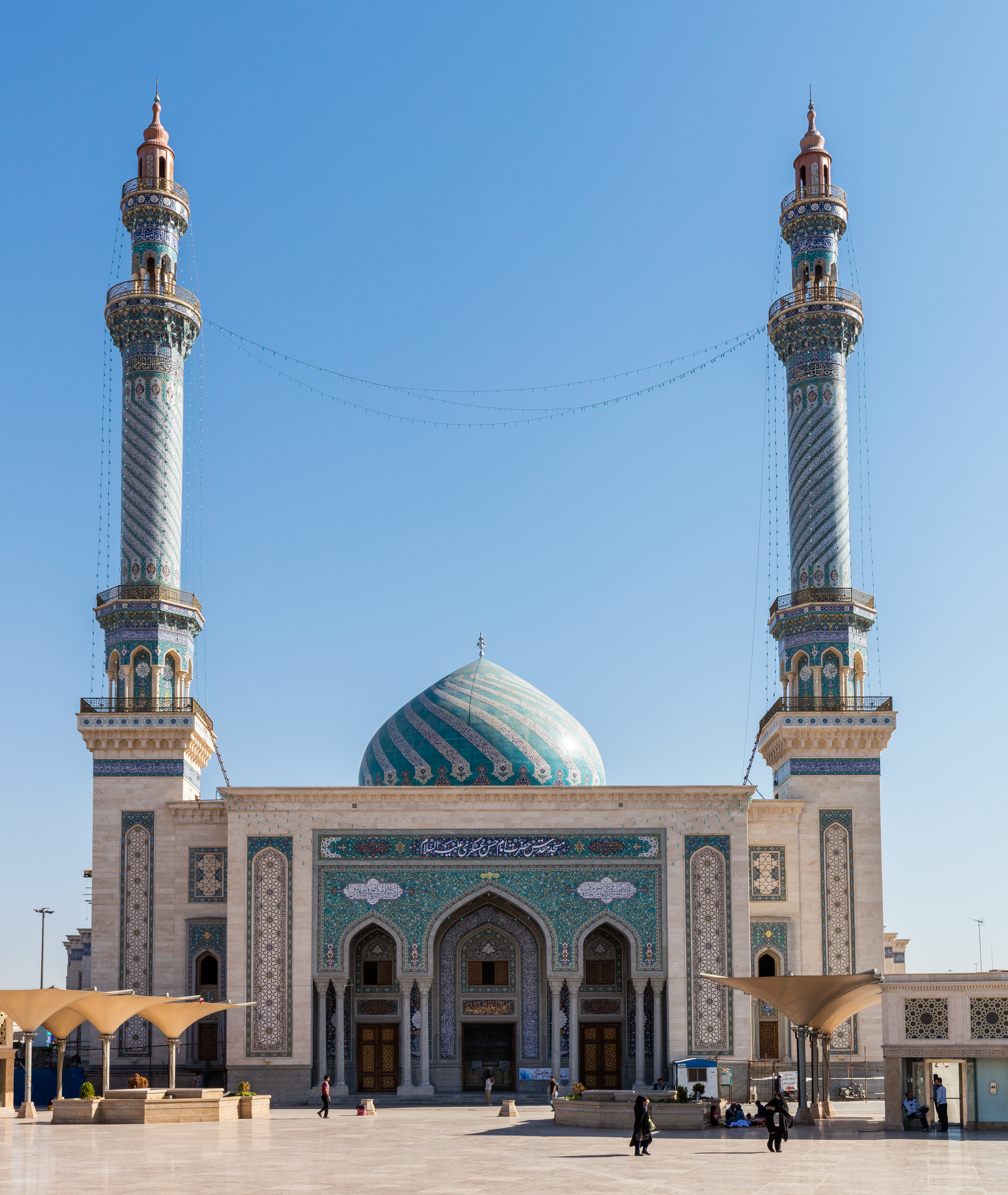
Front view of the mosque

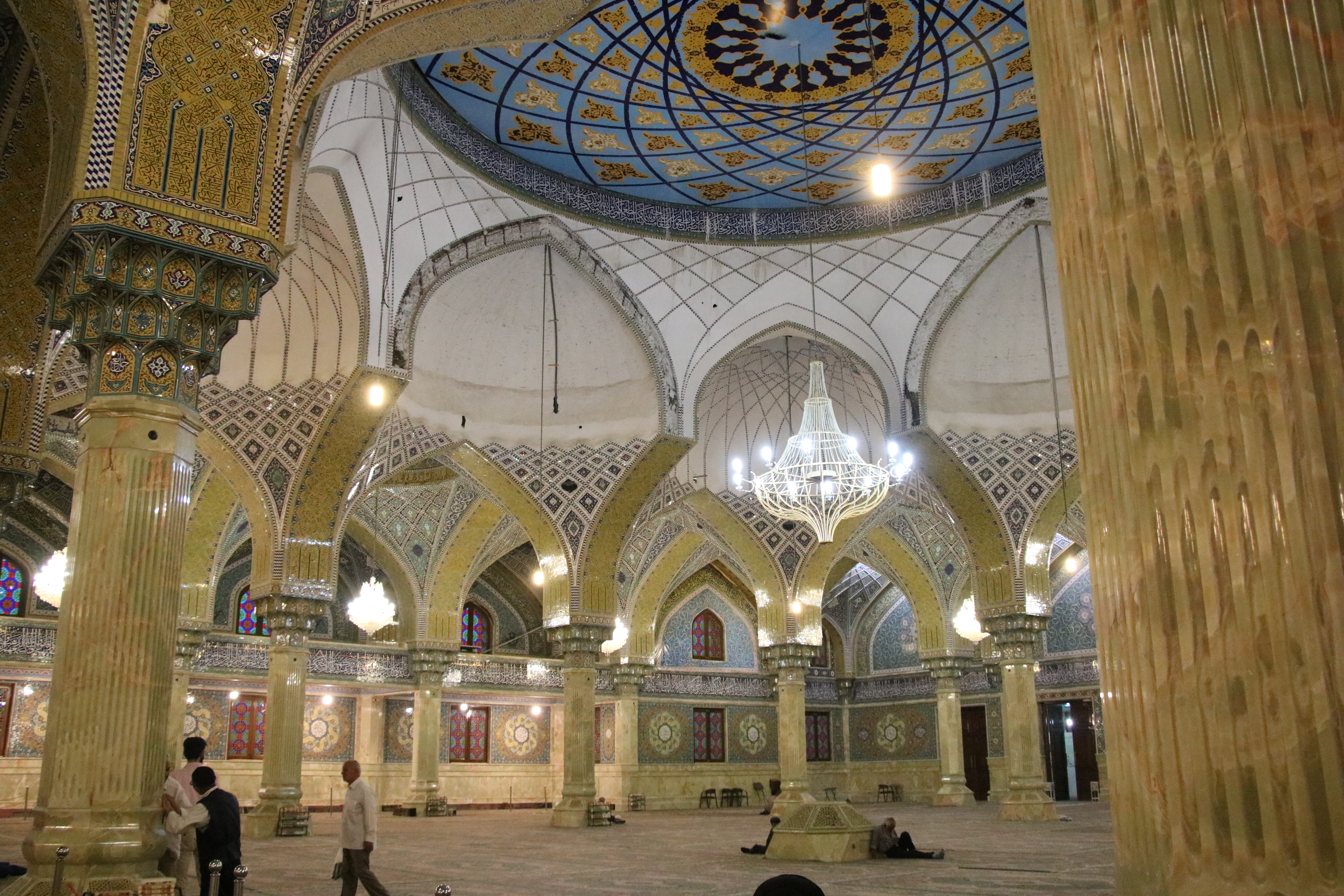
Inside the mosque

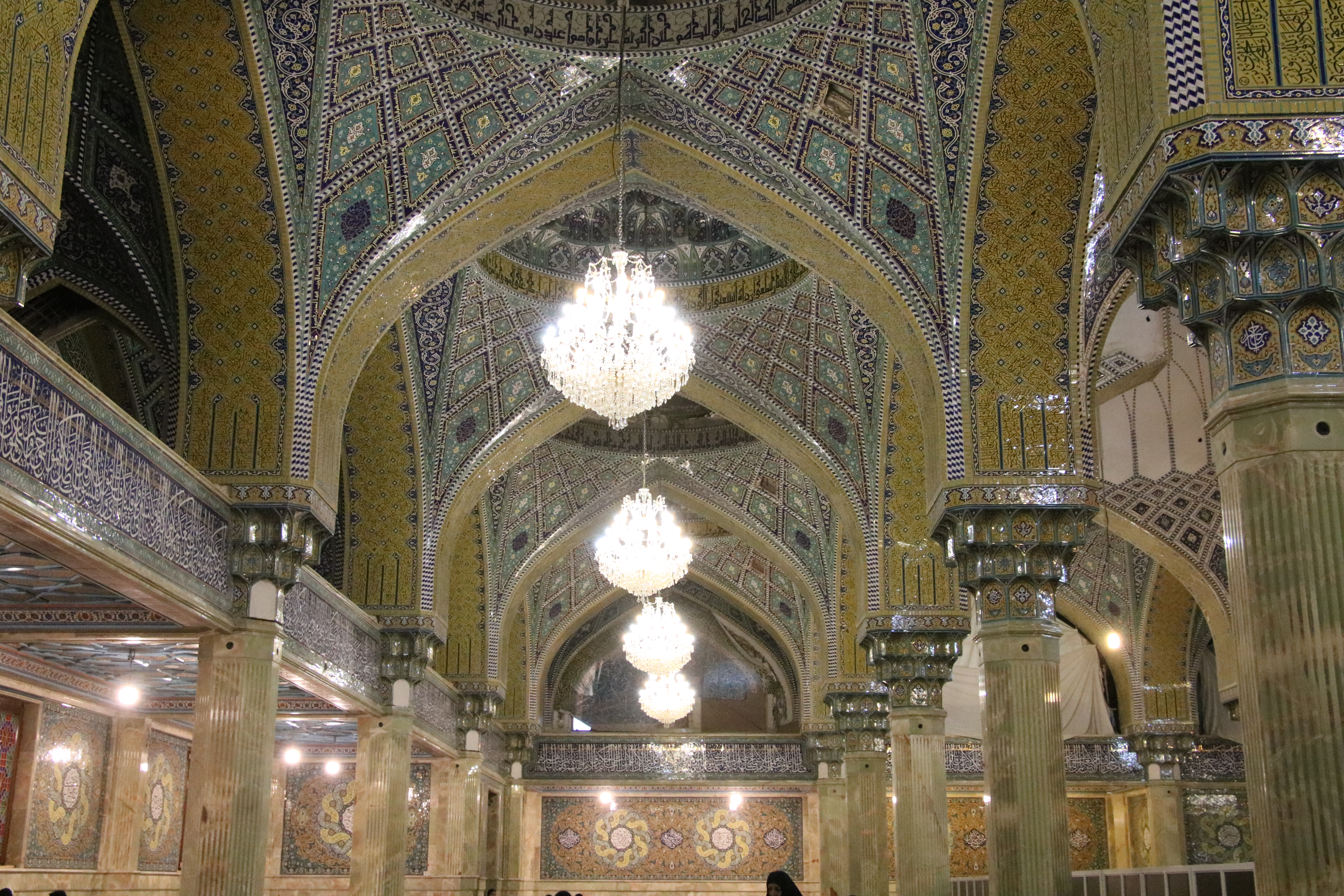
Some chandeliers hanging from the ceiling of a corridor in the mosque

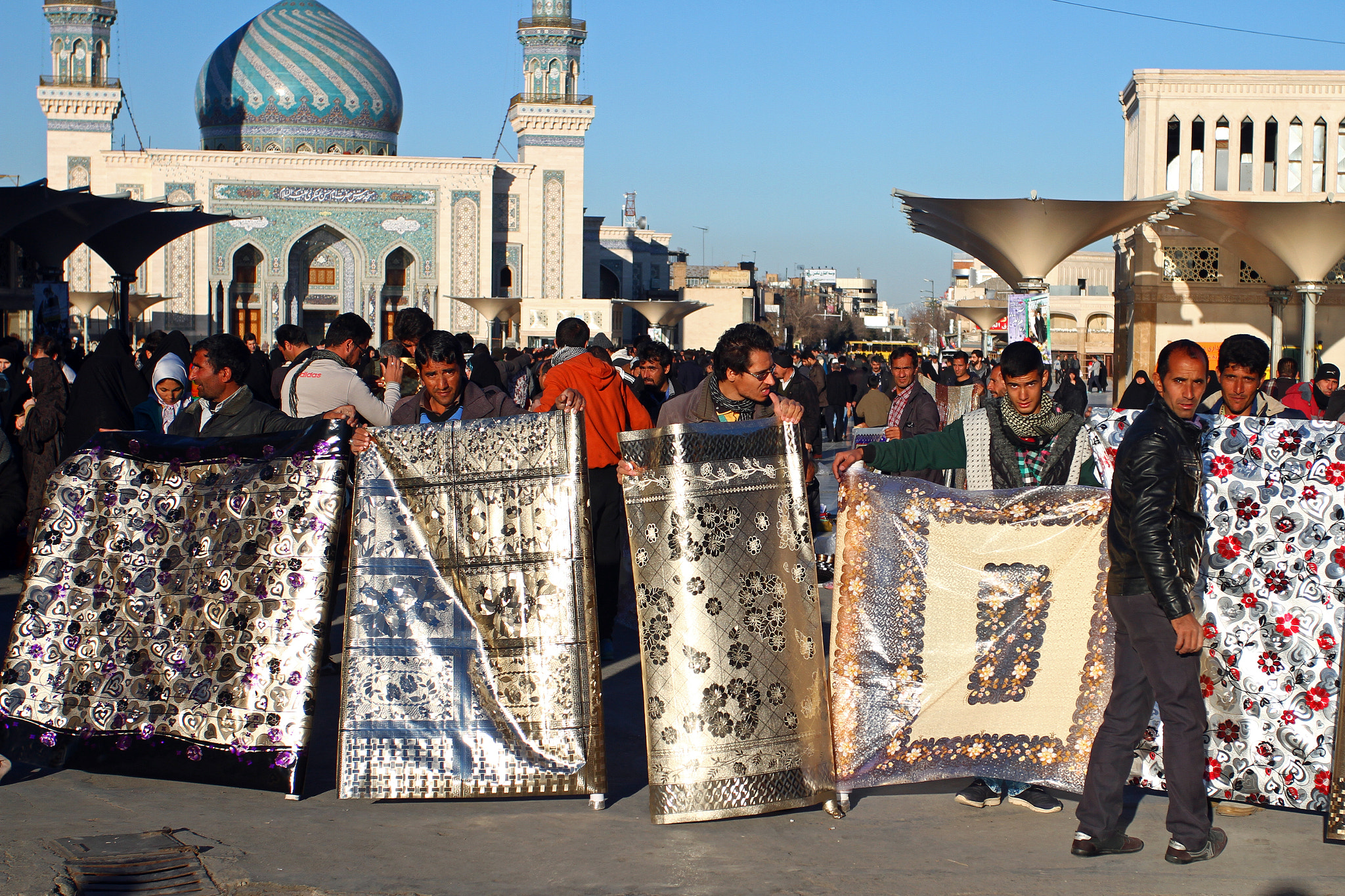
A protest outside the mosque, with the people flashing banners that indicate this protest is only for cultural and not religious purposes

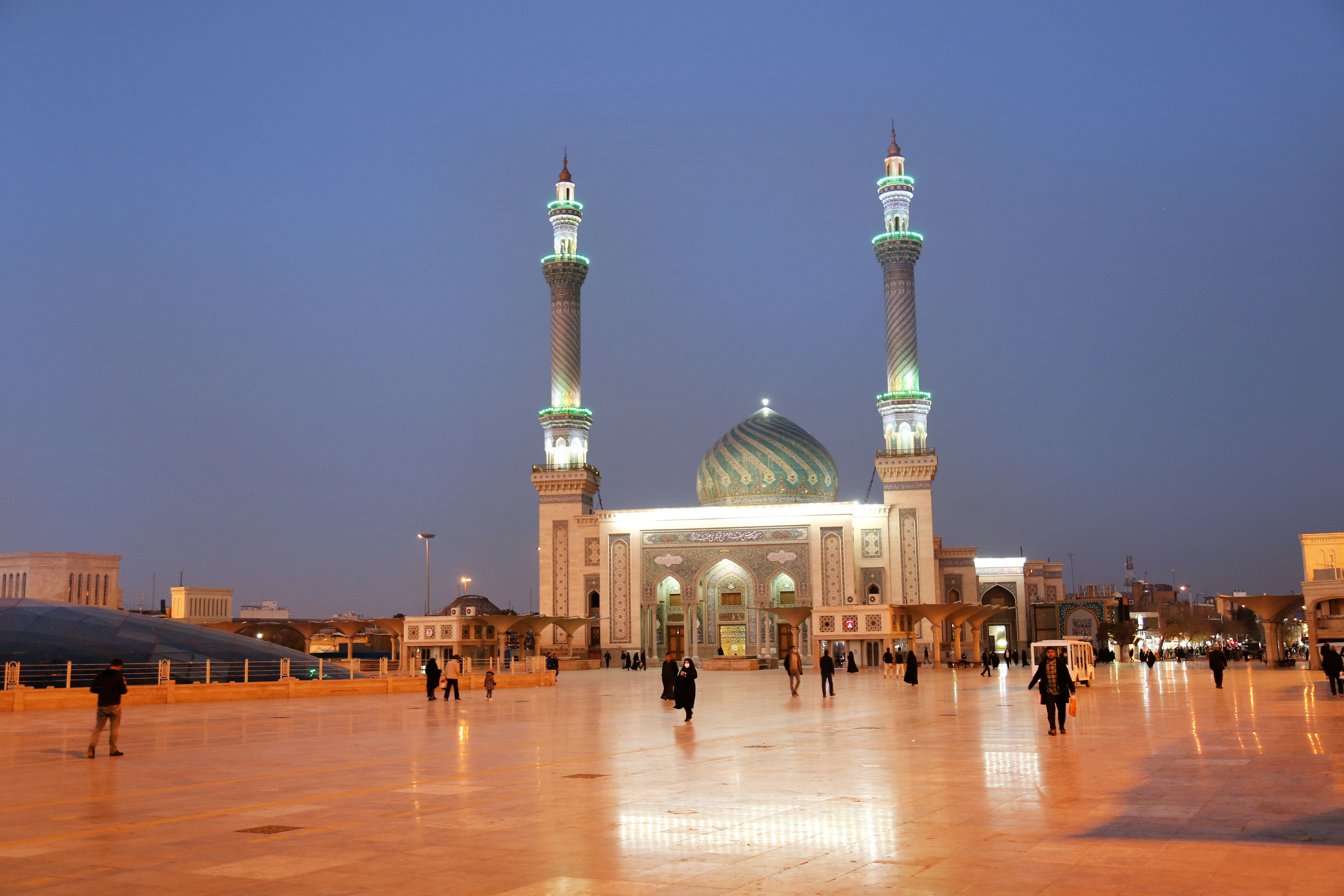
The mosque at night

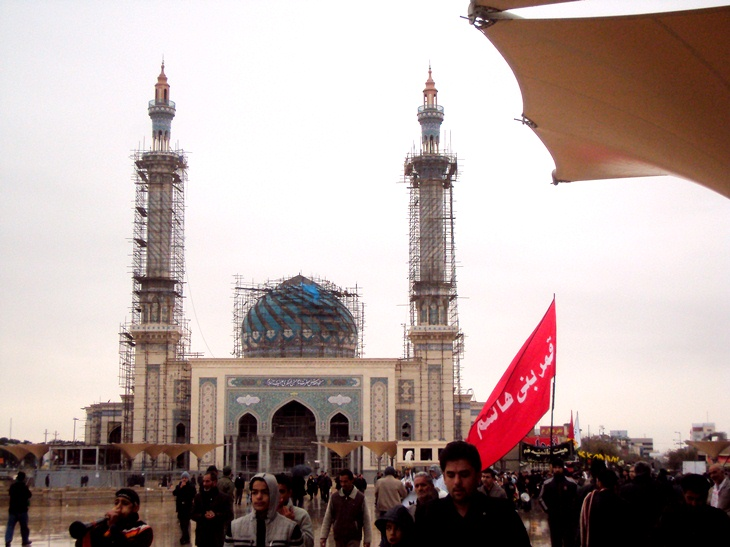
Mourning ceremony for the day of Tasu'a al-Husayni in Qom

== See also ==
- Shia Islam in Iran
- List of mausoleums in Iran
- List of mosques in Iran
- List of oldest mosques in Iran
