= Dar ul-Ihsan Mosque =

Mosque in Sanandaj, Iran

- مسجد دارالاحسان
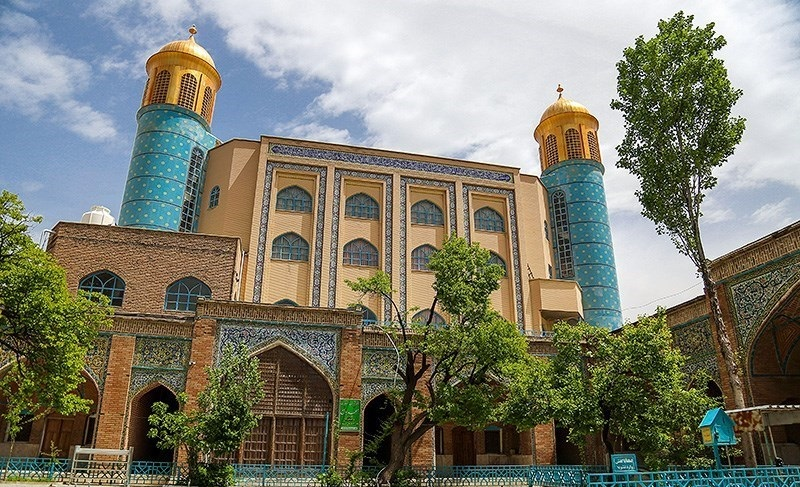
- The mosque façade in 2020

- Location of the mosque in Iran

Religion
- Affiliation: Sunni Islam
- Ecclesiastical or organisational status: Friday mosque
- Status: Active

Location
- Location: Sanandaj, Kurdistan Province
- Country: Iran
- Coordinates: 35°19′12″N 46°59′43″E

Architecture
- Type: Mosque architecture
- Style: Qajar
- Completed: 1812 CE; 1964 (minaret added)

Specifications
- Dome: One (maybe more)
- Minaret: Two
- Materials: Bricks, mortar, tiles

Iran National Heritage List
- Official name: Dar ol-Ehsan Mosque
- Type: Mosque
- Designated: 1949
- Reference no.: 375
- Conservation organization: Cultural Heritage, Handicrafts and Tourism Organization of Iran

The Dar ol-Ehsan Mosque (Persian: مسجد دارالاحسان, romanized: Masjid Darul Ehsan; Arabic: مسجد دار الإحسان), also known as the Jameh Mosque of Sanandaj (مسجد جامع سنندج or جامع سنندج), is a Friday mosque, located in the city of Sanandaj, western Iran. The mosque was completed in 1812 CE, during the Qajar era.

The mosque was added to the Iran National Heritage List on 21 February 1949, administered by the Cultural Heritage, Handicrafts and Tourism Organization of Iran.

== Gallery ==
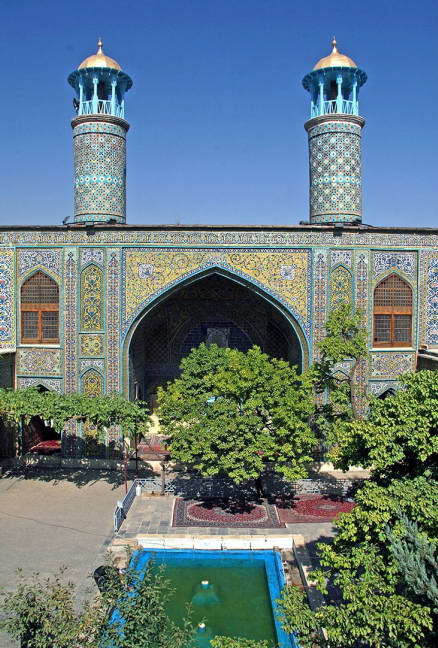

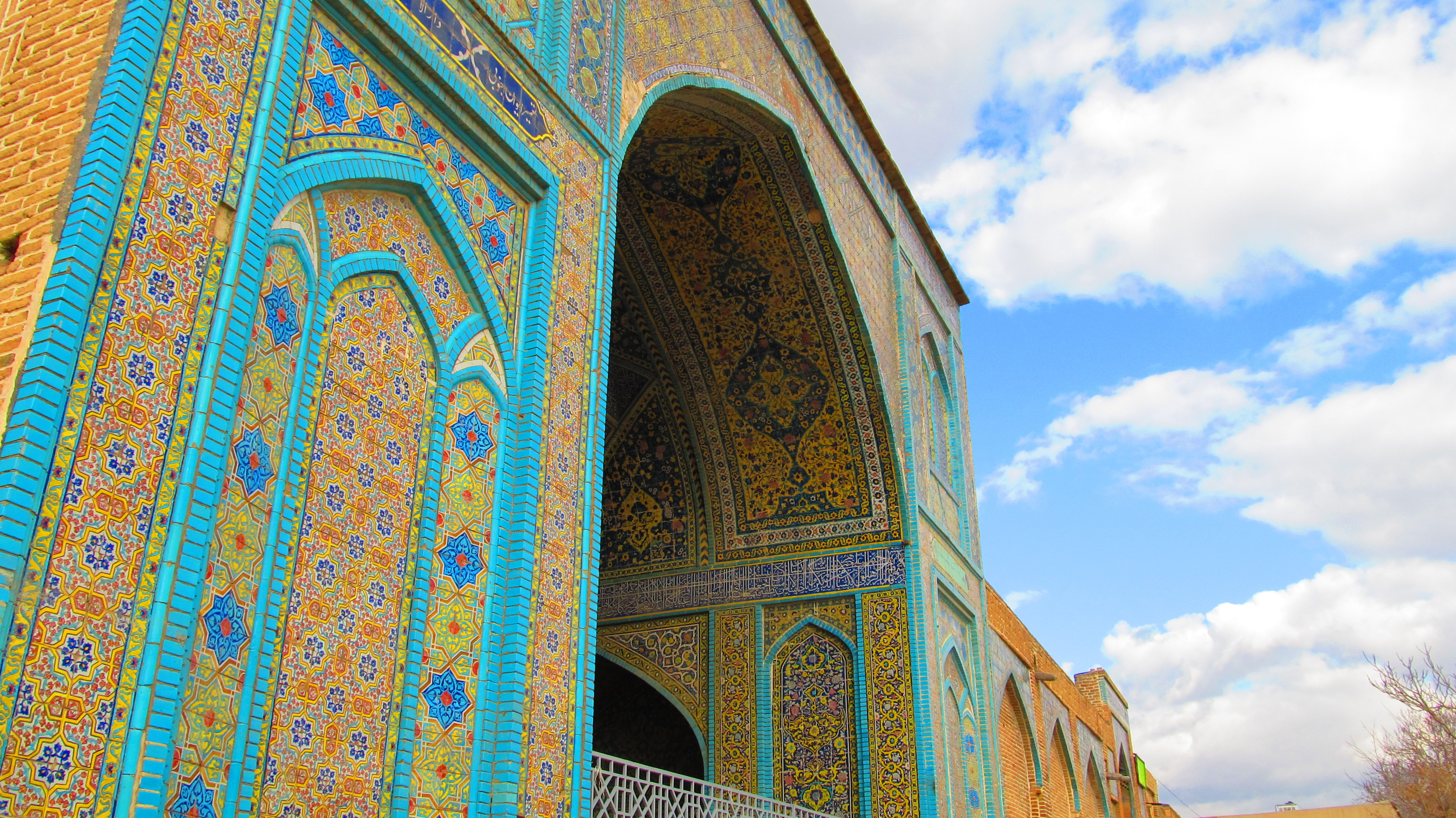

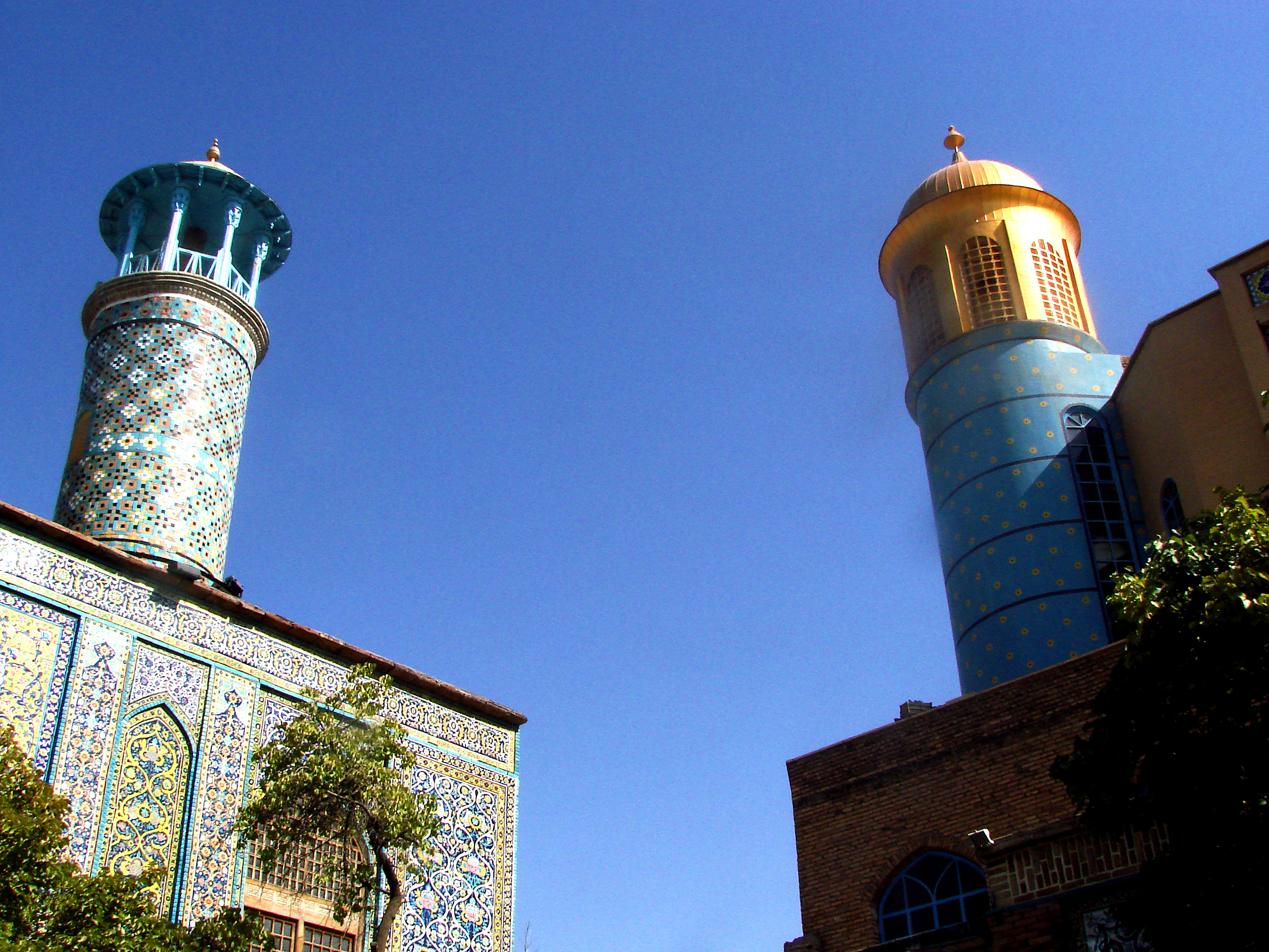

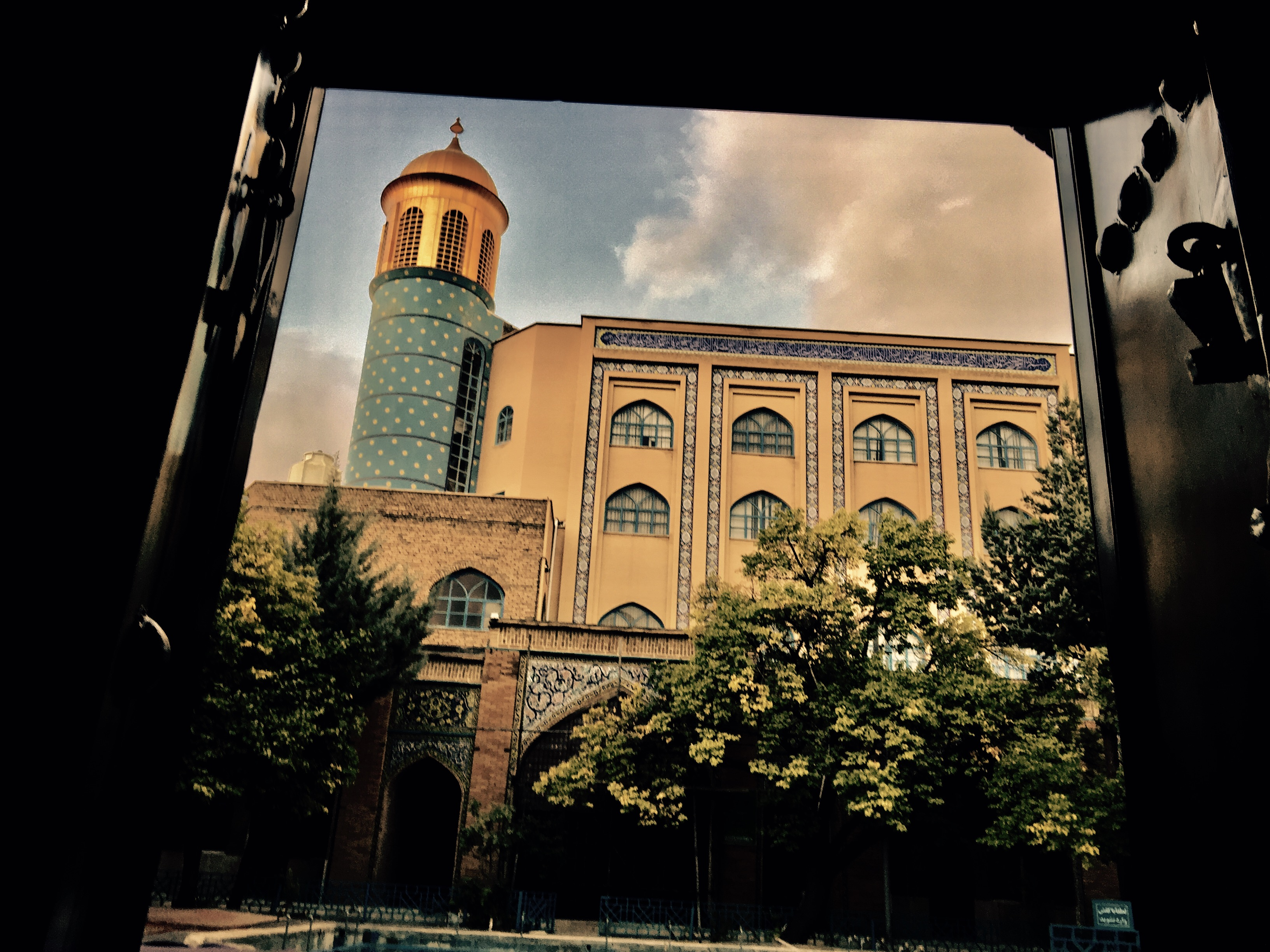

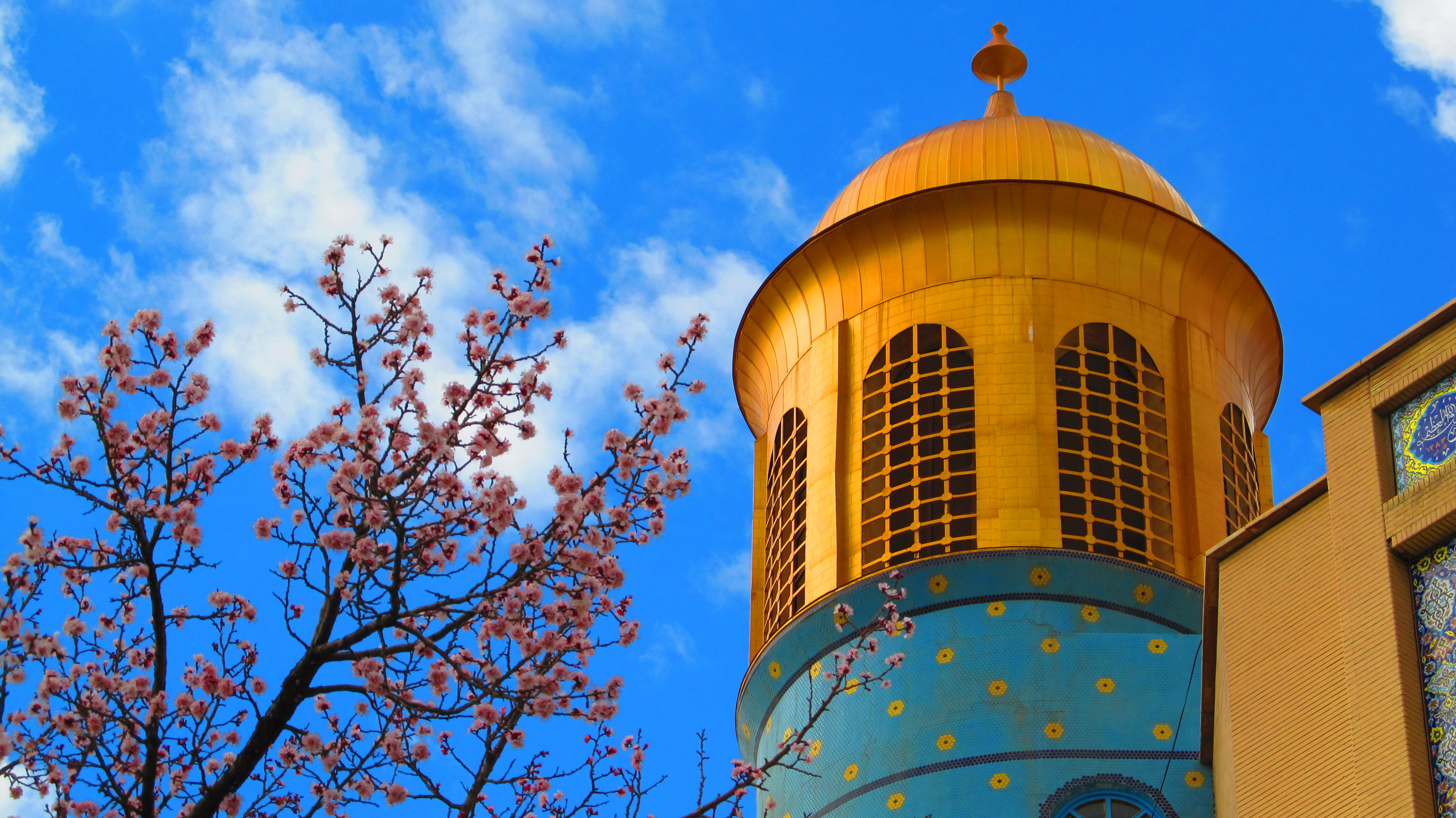

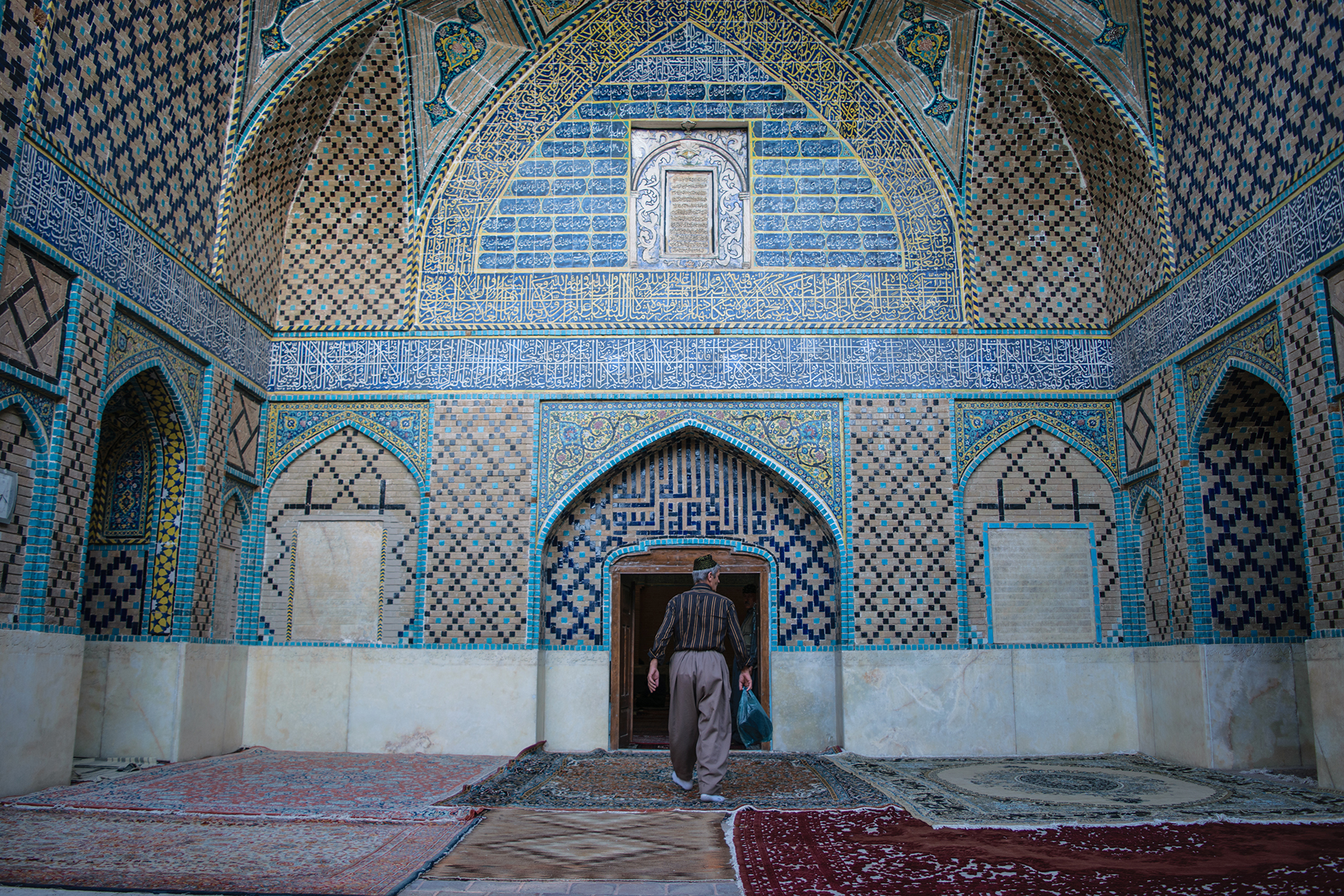

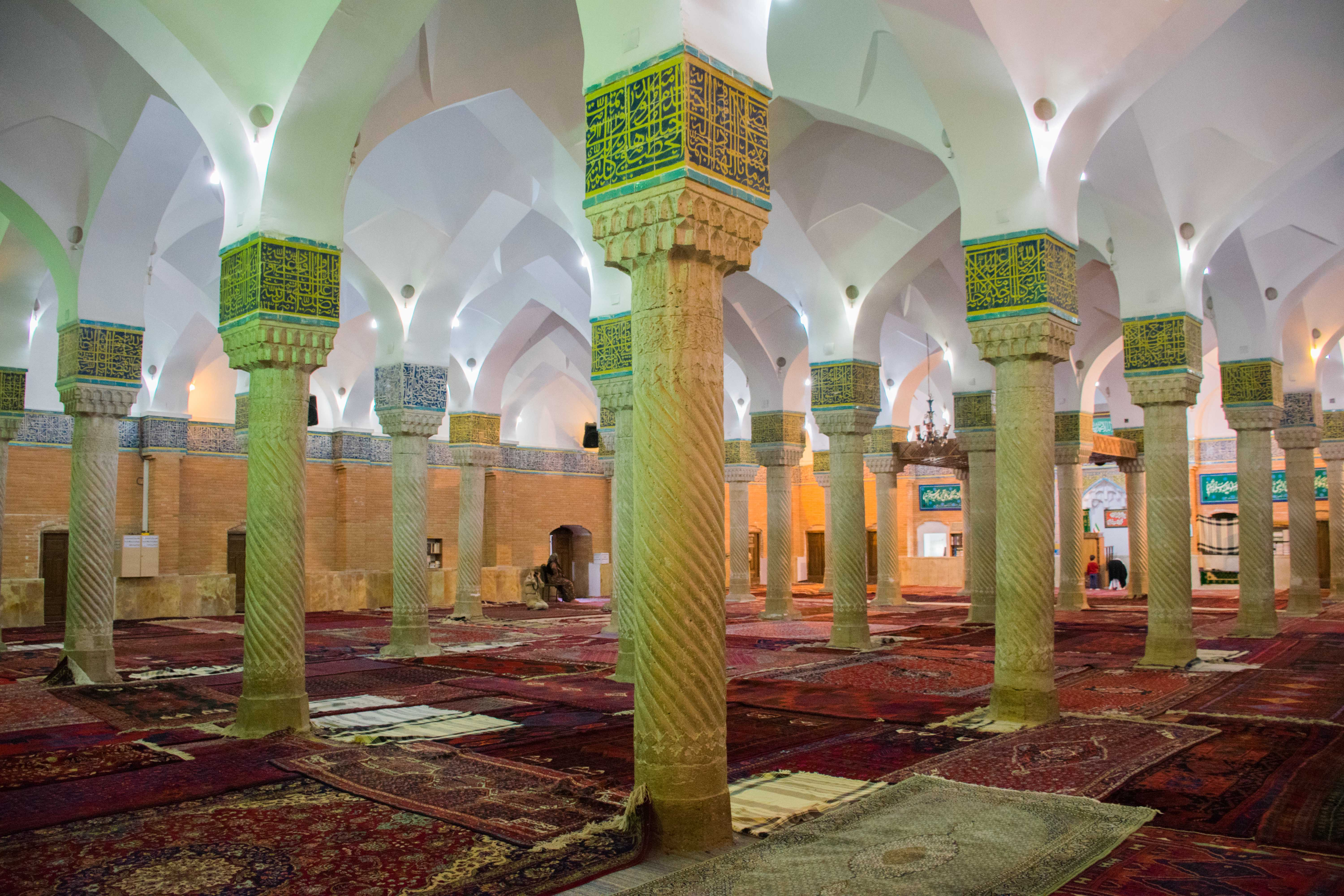

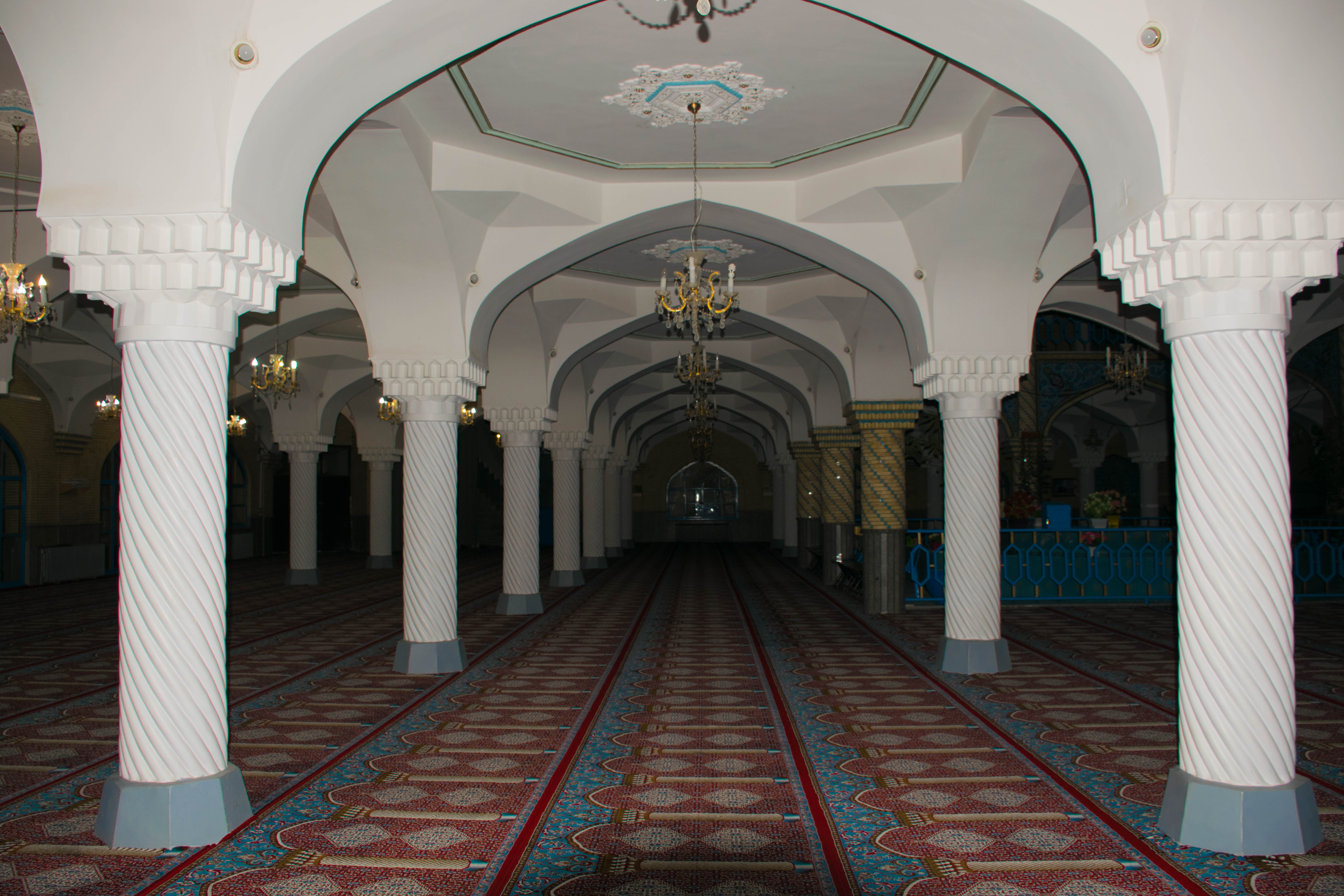

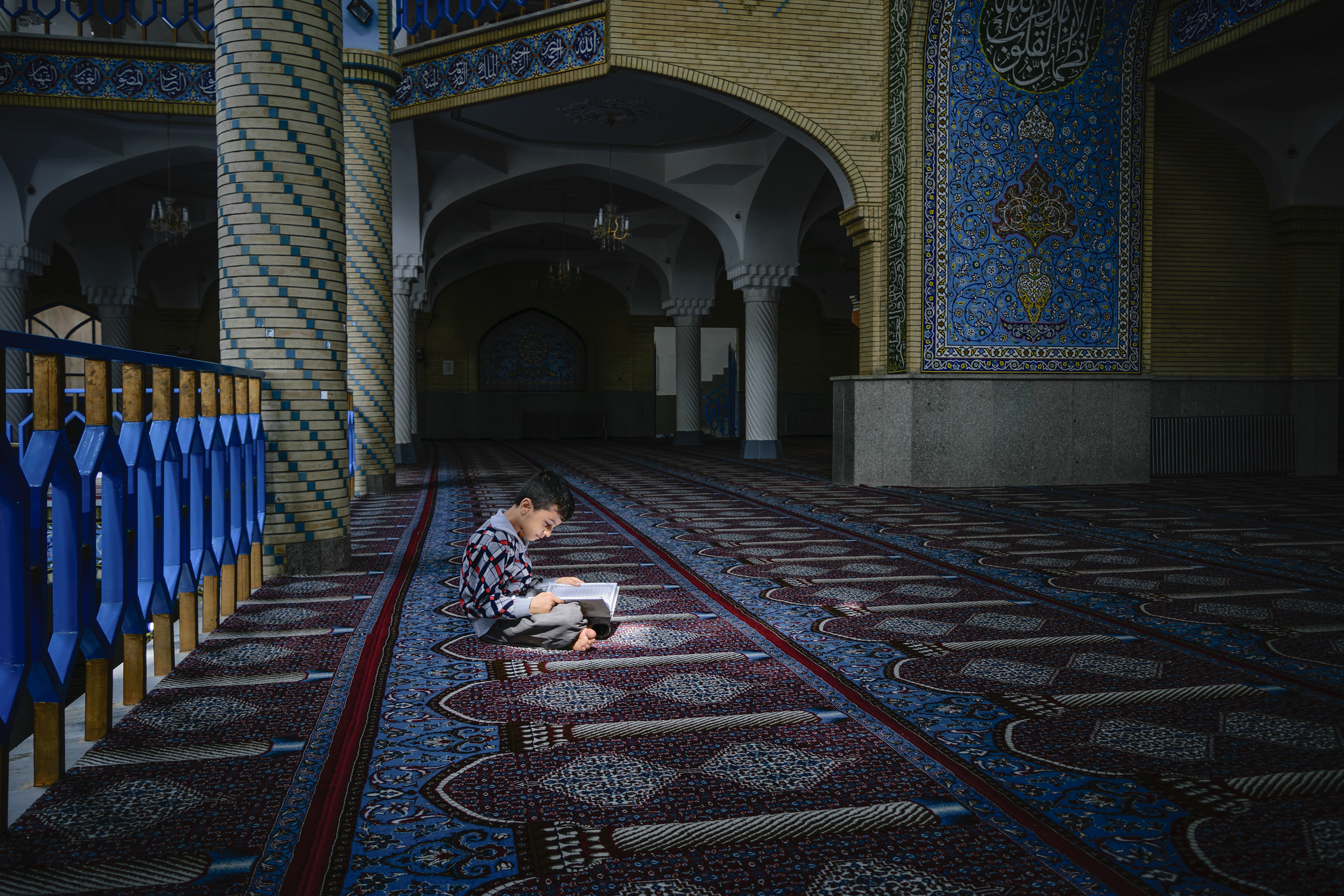

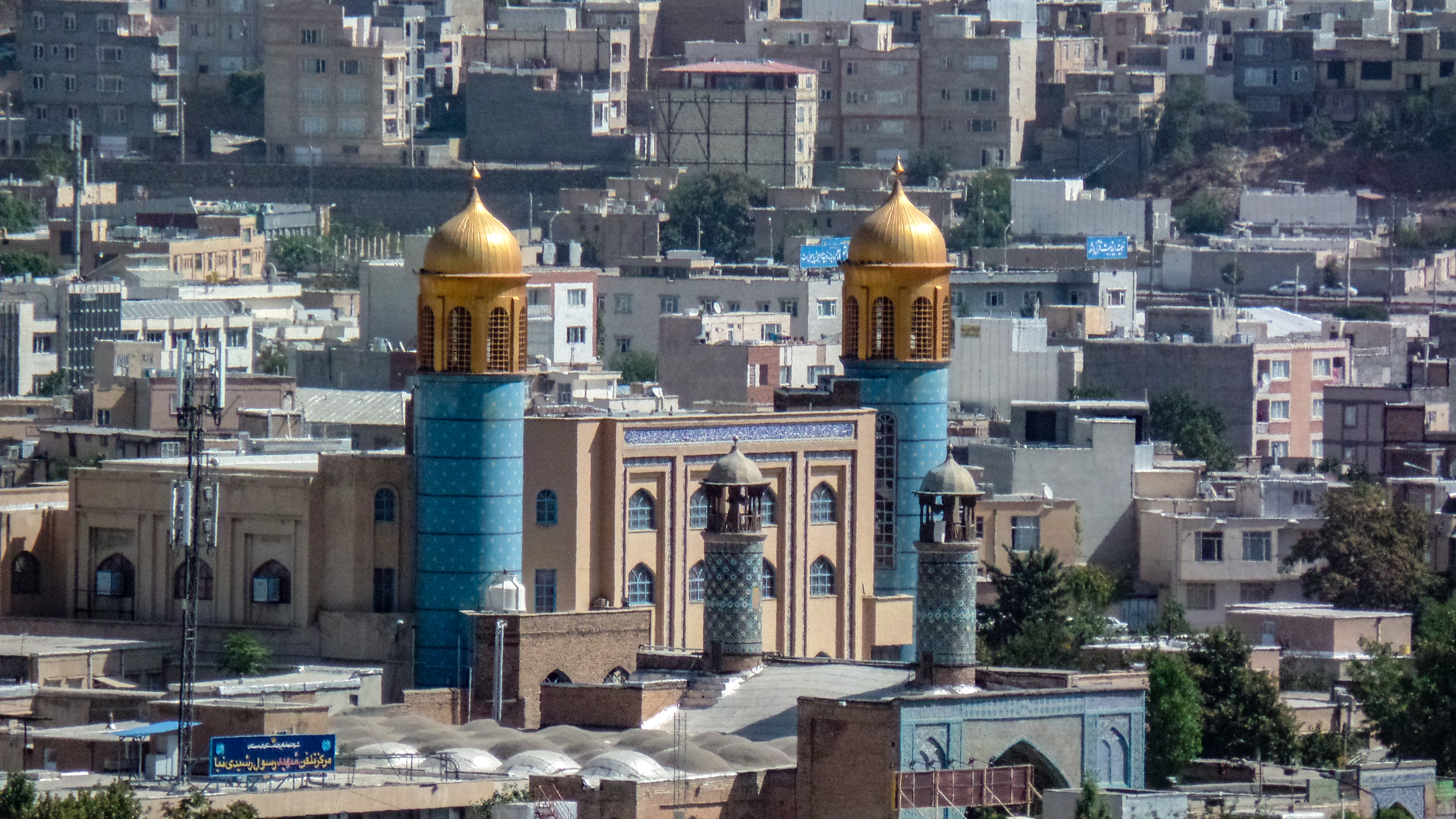

== See also ==
- Islam in Iran
- List of mosques in Iran
