= Victory Bridge, Yerevan =

Victory Bridge
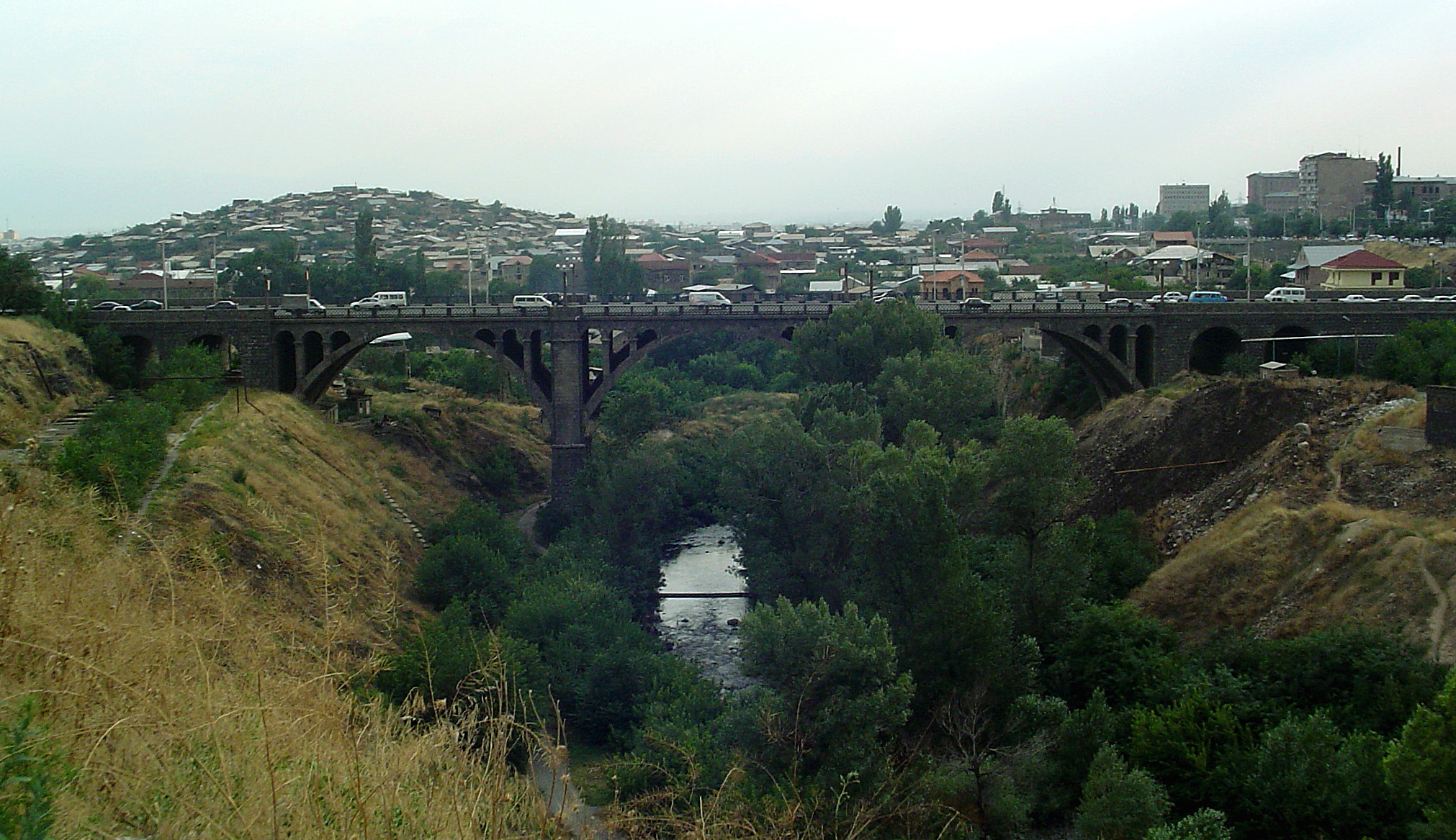
- The Victory Bridge
- Coordinates: 40°10′30″N 44°29′58″E
- Crosses: Hrazdan River
- Locale: Yerevan

Characteristics
- Total length: 200 m (656.2 ft)
- Width: 25 m (82.0 ft)
- Height: 34 m (111.5 ft)

History
- Opened: 1945

Statistics
- Daily traffic: Dual carriageway

Location
- Interactive map of Victory Bridge

The Victory Bridge or Haghtanak Bridge (Armenian: Հաղթանակի կամուրջ Haght'anaki kamurj) is an arch bridge for traffic linking across the Hrazdan River in Yerevan, Armenia. It connects the Mashtots Avenue in the east with the Admiral Isakov Avenue in the west. It was opened on 25 November 1945 and named the Victory Bridge to commemorate the Soviet victory over Nazi Germany at the end of World War II.

It was designed by architects A. Mamijanyan and A. Asatryan and consists of seven arches.
