= List of churches in Yerevan =

The following is a list of churches and cathedrals in the Armenian capital city of Yerevan along with their architectural styles.

== Active churches ==
=== Armenian Apostolic ===
Name	Image	Consecration	Location	Architect	Style
Katoghike Church		1264	15/1 Abovyan Street, Kentron District		Single-nave domed basilica
Saint Hakob Church of Kanaker		1679	20/1 Kanaker 6th street, Kanaker-Zeytun District		Three-nave basilica without dome
Zoravor Surp Astvatsatsin Church		1694	4 Tumanyan street 2nd alley, Kentron District		Three-nave basilica without dome
Holy Mother of God Church (Kanaker)		1695	Kanaker 6th street 2nd alley, Kanaker-Zeytun District		Three-nave basilica with no dome
Surp Gevork Church, Noragavit		17th century	Noragavit 7th street, Shengavit District		Three-nave basilica without dome
Saint John the Baptist Church		1710	15 Kozern street, Kentron District	Baghdasar Arzoumanian and Areg Israelyan (reconstruction)	Cruciform
Saint Sarkis Cathedral		1842	21 Israelyan street, Kentron District	Rafael Israelyan (renovation)	Vertical-emphasis rectangular
Surp Kiraki Church		19th century	Noragavit 7th street, Shengavit District		Single-nave basilica without dome
Saint Ananias' Chapel		1889	4 Tumanyan street 2nd alley, Kentron District		Single-nave domed basilica
Surp Khach Zoravor Chapel		1991	Shengavit District	Ruben Gasparyan	Single-nave basilica without dome
Holy Mother of God Church, Nork-Marash	Yerevan, Nork-Marash district, Surp Astvatsatsin Church	1995	225 Armenak Armenakyan street, Nork-Marash District		Radial
Holy Mother of God Church, Malatia-Sebastia		1998	Romanos Melikyan street, Malatia-Sebastia District	Hrachya Gasparyan	Radial
Holy Vartanants Martyrs Chapel		1998	Yerablur, Malatia-Sebastia District		Single-nave domed basilica
Saint Sarkis Church, Nor Nork		1999	Galshoyan street, Nor Nork District	Baghdasar Arzoumanian	Circular
Saint Gregory Cathedral		2001	Yervand Kochar street, Kentron District	Stepan Kurkchyan	Mix of cruciform and vertical-emphasis rectangular
Holy Mother of God Church, Avan		2002	Marshall Babajanian street, Avan District	Grisha Melik-Sarkisian	Cruciform
Holy Martyrs Church, Davtashen		2003	Sasna Tsrer street, Davtashen District	Levon Oumedyan	Single-nave domed basilica
Holy Trinity Church		2005	11 Raffi street, Malatia-Sebastia District	Baghdasar Arzoumanian	Circular
Holly Cross Church, Charbakh		2006	Nerkin Charbakh 8th street, Shengavit District	Hrachya Gasparyan	Cruciform
Holy Mother of God Church, Nor Nork		2014	Fridtjof Nansen park, Nor Nork District	Albert Sokhikyan; Artashes Sokhikyan	Single-nave domed basilica
Holy Martyrs Church, Nubarashen		2015	13th street, Nubarashen District	Artak Ghulyan	Radial
Saint Anna Church		2015	Abovyan Street, Kentron District	Vahagn Movsisyan	Cruciform
Holy Cross Church, Arabkir		2018	Komitas Avenue, Arabkir District	Artak Ghulyan	Vertical-emphasis rectangular
Church of the Holy Apostles, Shengavit		2019	Verin Shengavit 2nd Street, Shengavit District	Hakob Babakhanyan	Single-nave domed basilica

=== Russian Orthodox church buildings ===
Name	Image	Consecration	Location	Architect	Style
Intercession of the Holy Mother of God		1916	68 Zakaria Kanakertsi street, Kanaker-Zeytun District	Fyodor Verzhbitsky	Mix of bell-tower and single-domed ship-like churches style
Holy Cross Church		2017	Admiral Isakov Avenue, Malatia-Sebastia District		Four piers church style

== Partly-ruined churches ==
=== Armenian Apostolic ===
Name	Image	Consecration	Location	Architect	Style
Holy Mother of God Chapel (Avan) (half-ruined)		4th century	Never Safaryan street, Avan District		Single-nave basilica with no dome
Katoghike Tsiranavor Church (Avan) (half-ruined)		591	Marshal Khudyakov street 2nd alley, Avan District		Radial
Surp Hovhannes Chapel (Avan) (half-ruined)		12-13th centuries	Never Safaryan street, Avan District		Single-nave basilica with no dome
Holy Mother of God Parochial Church (Avan)		19th century	Avan 14th street 4th alley, Avan District		Single-nave basilica with no dome

== Entirely demolished churches ==
=== Armenian Apostolic ===
Name	Image	Consecration	Demolition	Location	Architect	Style
Saint Paul and Peter Church		5th century	1930	Replaced by the Moscow Cinema on Abovyan Street, Kentron District		Single-nave basilica with no dome
Holy Mother of God Katoghike Church		7th century	1936	Replaced by the languages institute on Abovyan Street, Kentron District		Three-nave domed basilica
Gethsemane Chapel		1690s	1920s	Replaced by the Yerevan Opera Theater on Tumanyan street, Kentron District		Single-nave basilica with no dome
Mler Chapel		19th century	1930s	Replaced by the Komitas Pantheon on Arshakunyats Avenue, Shengavit District		Cruciform
Saint Gregory the Illuminator Church		1900	1949	Replaced by the Yeghishe Charents School on Amiryan street, Kentron District		Cruciform

=== Russian Orthodox ===
Name	Image	Consecration	Demolition	Location	Architect	Style
Saint Nikolai Russian Cathedral		Second half of the 19th century	1931	Replaced by Shahumyan Square, Kentron District	Vasili Mirzoyan, Nikita Kitkin	Four piers church style

== Under construction ==
=== Armenian Apostolic ===
Name	Image	Consecration	Location	Architect	Style
Holy Translators Church		TBD	Tbilisi highway, Arabkir District	Erick Ohanyan	Circular
Surp Mesrop Mashtots Church		TBD	Liberators' Street, Erebuni District	Artak Ghulyan	Mix of cruciform and vertical-emphasis rectangular
Holy Martyrs Church		2020	Arshakunyats Avenue, Shengavit District	Artak Ghulyan	Mix of cruciform and vertical-emphasis rectangular
