= Timeline of Yerevan =

The following is a timeline of the history of the city of Yerevan, Armenia.

== Prior to 20th century ==
- 782 BCE - Settlement founded by Argishti I of Urartu.
- 590s CE - Katoghike Tsiranavor Church of Avan built.
- 1582 - Turks in power.
- 1583 - Yerevan Fortress built.
- 1615 - Town besieged by Turkish forces.
- 1679 - 4 June: 1679 Armenia earthquake
- 1830 - Red Bridge rebuilt.
- 1837 - Tsarskaya Street opens.
- 1842 - Saint Sarkis Cathedral rebuilt.
- 1873 - Population: 11,938.
- 1877 - Yerevan Ararat Wine Factory in operation.
- 1879 - Hovhannes Ghorghanyan becomes mayor.
- 1897 - Population: 28,910.

== 20th century ==
- 1913 - Population: 34,000.
- 1915 - Refugees from Armenian genocide begin to arrive in yerevan.
- 1918 - 28 May: Yerevan becomes capital of the First Republic of Armenia.
- 1920
  - 29 November: Bolsheviks in power.
  - Yerevan becomes capital of Armenian Soviet Socialist Republic.
  - Nairi Cinema opens.
- 1921 - Armenian State University established.
- 1924 - Art school opens.
- 1926 - Population: 64,613.
- 1930 - Spartak Stadium built.
- 1931 - Saint Nikolai Cathedral demolished.
- 1933 - Opera Theater opens.
- 1934 - Golos Armenii Russian-language newspaper begins publication.
- 1936
  - City renamed "Yerevan."
  - Moscow Cinema opens.
  - Komitas Pantheon (cemetery) established.
- 1939 - Population: 200,031.
- 1940
  - Yerevan Zoo opens.
  - Statue of Lenin erected in Lenin Square.

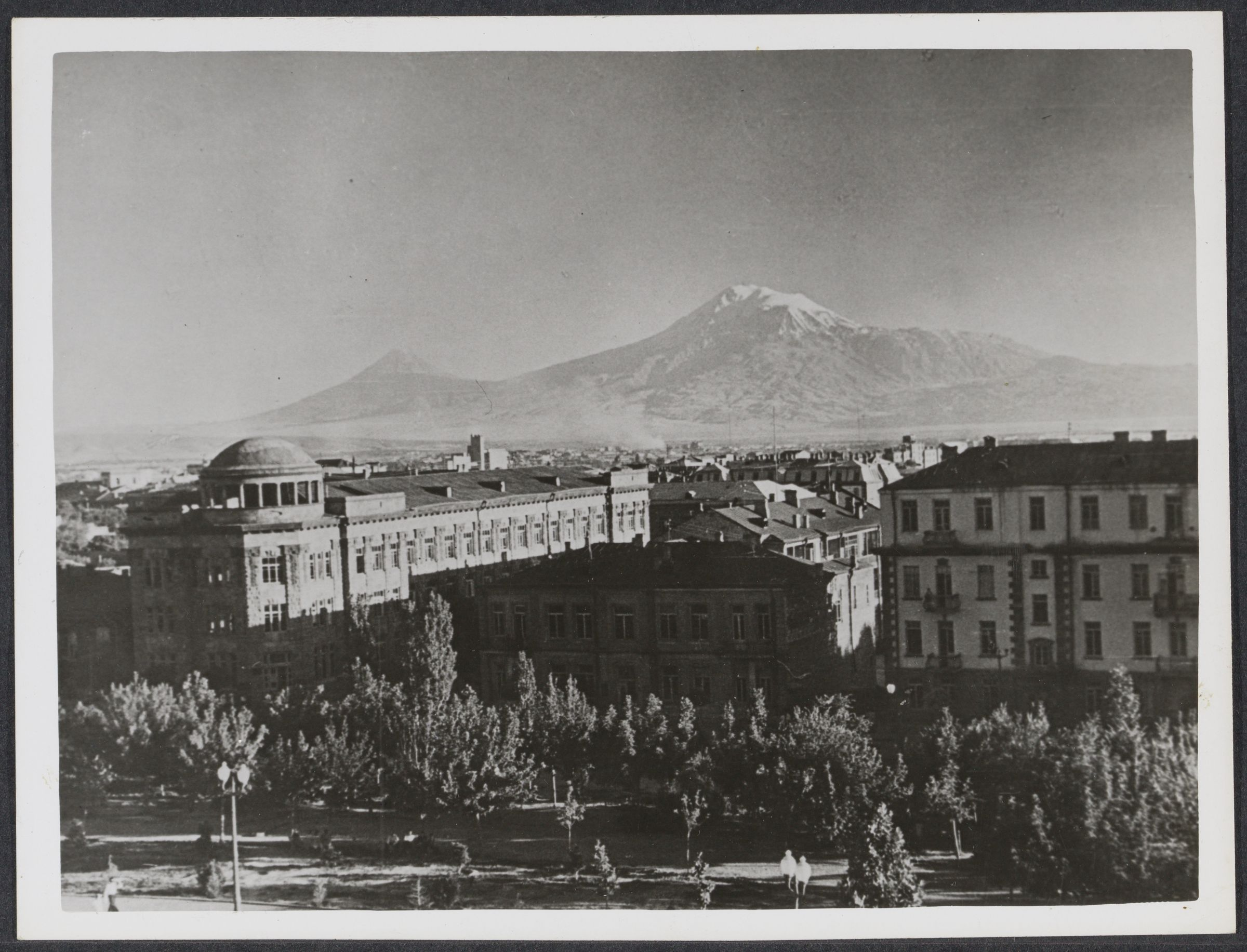
Yerevan in 1947

- 1949 - Pushkin Park designed.
- 1959 - Souren Spandaryan Square opens.
- 1961 - Zvartnots International Airport opens.
- 1965
  - 24 April: 1965 Yerevan demonstrations.
  - Population: 623,000.
- 1967
  - Mother Armenia monument erected in Victory Park.
  - Armenian Genocide memorial erected on Tsitsernakaberd.
- 1970s - Yerevan Museum of Contemporary Art established.
- 1970 - Hrazdan Stadium and Chess House open.
- 1977 - Yerevan TV Tower erected.
- 1979 - Population: 1,055,000.
- 1980 - Yerevan Cascade built.
- 1981 - Yerevan Metro begins operating; Marshal Baghramyan (metro station) opens.
- 1982 - House-Museum of Aram Khachaturian opens.
- 1983 - Karen Demirchyan Sports and Concerts Complex opens.
- 1985 - Population: 1,133,000 (estimate).
- 1987 - Garegin Nzhdeh Square (metro station) opens.
- 1988
  - 18–26 February: Major demonstration held in Yerevan demanding the unification of Karabakh with Armenia.
  - 22 March: Demonstration.
  - 26 March: Demonstration.
  - 7 December: Influx of refugees following the 1988 Armenian earthquake.
- 1991
  - 21 September: Armenian independence referendum, 1991 held.
  - Azg and Yerkir newspapers in publication.
- 1992
  - 20 January: Football Club Pyunik formed.
  - Armenian Center for Contemporary Experimental Art active.
- 1993 - Yerevan Stock Exchange established.
- 1994 - Food demonstration.
- 1996 - September: Protest following Armenian presidential election, 1996.

== 21st century ==
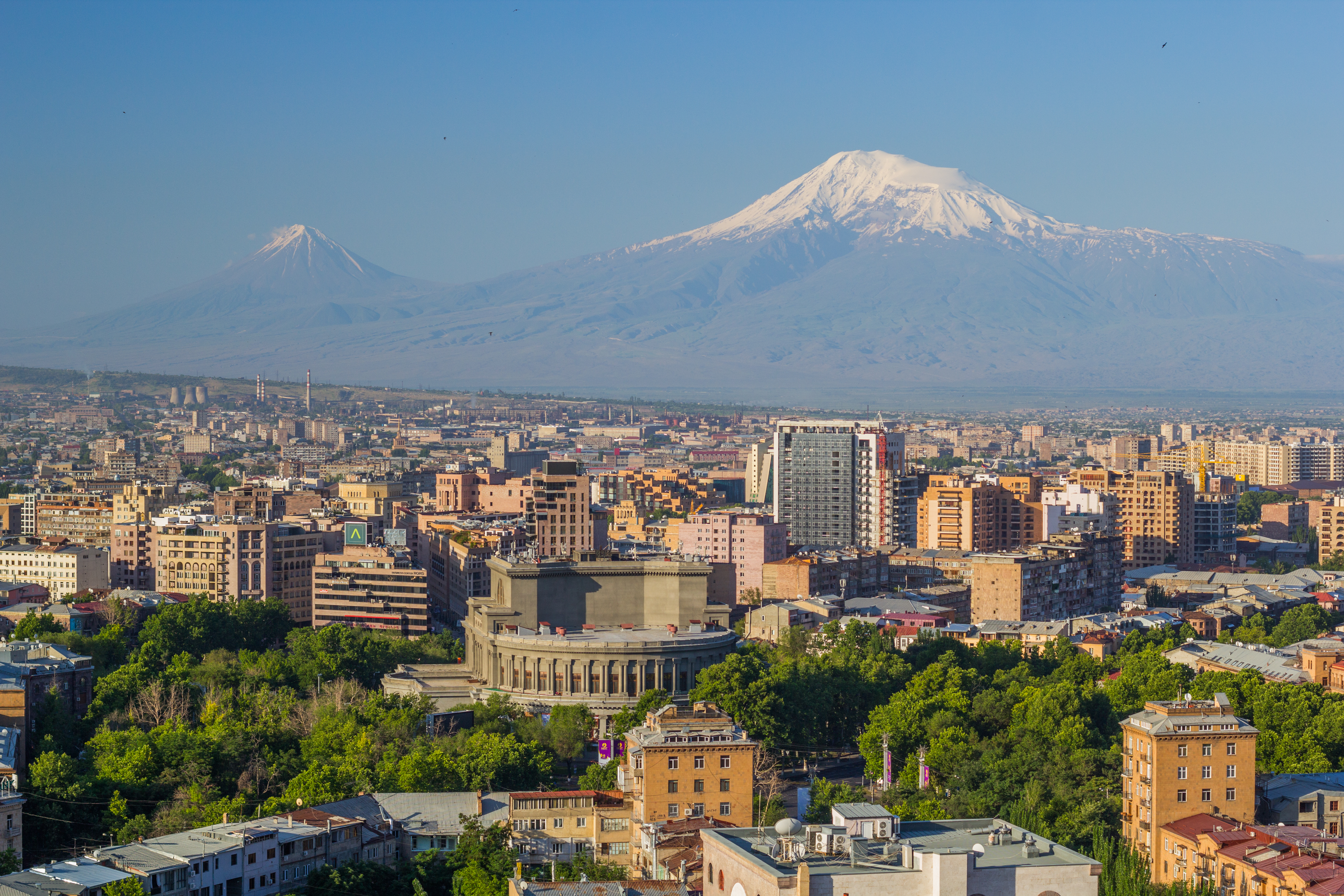
Modern view to Yerevan

- 2001 - Hovik Hayrapetyan Equestrian Centre opens.
- 2003
  - Yervand Zakharyan becomes mayor.
  - Armenian International Policy Research Group headquartered in city.
- 2004
  - Yerevan International Film Festival begins.
  - Yerevan City Hall built.
- 2007 - Sister city relationship established with Los Angeles, USA.
- 2008 - February–March: 2008 Armenian presidential election protests.
- 2009 - Cafesjian Museum of Art opens.
- 2011
  - Yerevan Velodrome and Mordechai Navi Synagogue open.
  - Taron Margaryan becomes mayor.
  - Population: 1,060,138.
  - Junior Eurovision Song Contest 2011 held.
- 2012 - City named World Book Capital by UNESCO.
- 2014 - Yerevan Mall in business.
- 2018 - April: 2018 Armenian protests.
- 2022
  - 11 October: Khachkar commemorating Armenian-Polish friendship and Pope John Paul II unveiled.
  - Junior Eurovision Song Contest 2022 held.

== See also ==
- Yerevan history
- History of Yerevan
- List of mayors of Yerevan
- Other names of Yerevan (e.g. Erivan, Eriwan, Iravan, Irwan, Jerewan)
- Timeline of Armenian history
- Timeline of modern Armenian history

== Bibliography ==
Published in 19th century

- Abraham Rees (1819), "Erivan", The Cyclopaedia, London: Longman, Hurst, Rees, Orme & Brown, hdl:2027/mdp.39015068382319 – via HathiTrust
- Robert Ker Porter (1821), "(Erivan)", Travels in Georgia, Persia, Armenia, ancient Babylonia, &c. &c, London: Longman, Hurst, Rees, Orme, and Brown, OCLC 5524754
- William Ouseley (1823), "(Iravan)", Travels in various countries of the East; more particularly Persia, London: Rodwell and Martin, OCLC 4198311
- Evliya Çelebi (1834). "Description of the Town of Erivan (Revan)". Narrative of Travels in Europe, Asia, and Africa, in the Seventeenth Century. Publications - Oriental Translation Fund. Vol. 2. Translated by Joseph von Hammer-Purgstall. London: Oriental Translation Fund. hdl:2027/uc2.ark:/13960/t40s01w59.
- Douglas W. Freshfield (1869). "(Erivan)". Travels in the Central Caucasus and Bashan. London: Longmans, Green, & Co. hdl:2027/njp.32101054380249.
- J. Buchan Telfer (1876). "(Erivan)". The Crimea and Transcaucasia. London: H.S. King & Company.
- George Ripley; Charles A. Dana, eds. (1879). "Erivan". American Cyclopedia (2nd ed.). New York: D. Appleton and Company. hdl:2027/hvd.hn585u.
- "Erivan". Hand-book for Travellers in Russia, Poland, and Finland (4th ed.). London: John Murray. 1888.
- Charles Wilson, ed. (1895), "Erivan", Handbook for Travellers in Asia Minor, Transcaucasia, Persia, etc., London: John Murray, ISBN 9780524062142, OCLC 8979039

Published in 20th century

- "Erivan", Chambers's Encyclopaedia, London: W. & R. Chambers, 1901, hdl:2027/uc2.ark:/13960/t7br92q5g – via HathiTrust
- H. F. B. Lynch (1901). "At Erivan". Armenia: Travels and Studies. London: Longmans, Green, and Co. hdl:2027/mdp.39015030723228.
- A.V. Williams Jackson (1906), "(Erivan)", Persia Past and Present: a Book of Travel and Research, New York: Macmillan
- "Erivan (town)" . Encyclopædia Britannica. Vol. 9 (11th ed.). 1910. p. 748.
- William Eleroy Curtis (1911). "(Erivan)". Around the Black Sea. New York: Hodder & Stoughton. hdl:2027/uc2.ark:/13960/t3222tf2d.
- "Erivan", Russia, Leipzig: Karl Baedeker, 1914, OCLC 1328163
- William Henry Beable (1919), "Erivan", Russian Gazetteer and Guide, London: Russian Outlook

Published in 21st century

- Rouben Paul Adalian (2010). "Yerevan". Historical Dictionary of Armenia (2nd ed.). Scarecrow Press. ISBN 978-0-8108-7450-3.
- Levon Abrahamian (2011). "Yerevan Sacra". In Tsypylma Darieva; et al. (eds.). Urban Spaces After Socialism: Ethnographies of Public Places in Eurasian Cities. Frankfurt: Campus-Verlag. ISBN 978-3-593-39384-1.
