= Urbanlab Yerevan =

urbanlab (sometimes also urbanlab_am and/or urbanlab.am) is a Yerevan-based independent urban think-do-share lab, aimed to promote democratization of urban landscape toward sustainable development in its broader understanding.

Established by some former activists fighting for historic preservation, urbanlab (previously urbanlab Yerevan) is a multi-disciplinary platform enabling the organization to operate in a diverse range of activities of self-initiated and/or commissioned research, content creation for public and professional reference, consultation, management and execution of community involvement in urban environmental cultural policy projects, as well as alternative and non-formal educational activities. The creation of urbanlab was announced on 8 November 2011 during a Pecha-Kucha Night Yerevan event by the urbanlab founder Sarhat Petrosyan.

On 29 December 2011 urbanlab Yerevan – Institute for Democratization of Urban Planning was registered. During 2016 urbanlab Yerevan non-governmental organization merged with Boghossian Gardens Beneficiary Foundation and since January 2017 urbanlab officially acts as urbanlab Social-Cultural Foundation.

== Background ==
In February 2010, by the decision of the Government of Armenia, the Open-Air Hall of Moscow Cinema was removed from the State List of Cultural and Historical Immobile Heritage of Armenia, paving way for its demolition and the rebuilding of Saint Paul-Peter church which used to stand there until early 20th century.

Once again teaming up with activists, urbanlab founders started a successful campaign for saving the cinema hall from destruction, employing social networks on Facebook and rallying for signatures, collecting over 23’000. Until today Moscow Cinema Open-Air Hall is standing.

“This has been the first case in the post-Soviet history of Yerevan where a major construction project was halted because of public opposition. As such it stood in stark contrast to earlier construction projects that were carried out during the 2000s, even though there had been both public criticism and civic campaigns directed against these projects as well,” historian Mikayel Zolyan states in his paper “Armenia’s Facebook Generation: Social networks and civic activism in Armenia” published by the University of California, Berkeley.

== Activities and projects ==
=== Research and consultancy ===
urbanlab realizes research and consults local communities and various stakeholders of urban planning, who are eager “to improve the built environment”.

Some notable projects of urbanlab are the Analysis and Development of the Urban Planning Documentation System and Analysis and Development Program for Legislative Basis of the Protection of Historical and Cultural Monuments, realized with the support of Counterpart International Armenia and the USAID presented widely to stakeholders of the field.

Among other notable projects of urbanlab are:

- Independent Landscape
- ReThink Metsamor
- Engage Vanadzor
- Folding Points of Yerevan

urbanlab founder Sarhat Petrosyan also curated the Pavilion of Armenia at the 15th International Architecture Exhibition – La Biennale di Venezia. During the exhibition, the launch of a unique landscape mapping laboratory of independent Armenia was announced. The project focuses on the study and reinterpretation of spatial transformations and its variations from 1991 to present day. The project was implemented from 2015 to 2016, exhibited in Holy Cross Church of the Armenian Mekhitarist Congregation located at Calle dei Armeni in Venice․ The Independent Landscape pavilion presented five different parts and researches: People’s Square, Visiting Post-Earthquake Gyumri, Shrinking Cemeteries, Expanded Housing, ReThink Metsamor. Each project had its unique visualization, created by different artists.

ReThink Metsamor is one of the researches presented at the pavilion and aims to establish a collaborative research by planners and visual artists on urban “history” of singular example of Soviet modernism – Metsamor town and Nuclear Power Plant located in the area (both built in 1970s) and also post-Soviet development of the urban environment, with a special focus on social obstacles caused by environmental fears and challenges.

With the support of European Association for Local Democracy (ALDA), urbanlab initiated Engage Vanadzor, a project aimed to promote re-evaluation of Armenia’s third largest city, Vanadzor’s modern tangible and intangible heritage- rock music and to advocate its preservation through community engagement.

urbanlab also implemented some self-initiated experimental projects, the results and data of which (notably, the Folding Points of Yerevan) have been in circulation among the interested parties. With this project urbanlab attempts to address urban planning issues in Yerevan through an alternative perspective.

=== Action and community involvement ===
The team carries out urban, environmental and cultural projects, which are mostly socially and culturally oriented and tend to be in accordance with general principals of their socially active role.

Notable urban projects carried out by the team are:

- Gyumri-Kars Common Urban Heritage Protection
- Conservation of Sevan Writers Resort
- Other Yerevan
- Project Management and implementation supervision of Lovers' Park in Yerevan
- Alternative Avenue
- Revitalization of Kond
- Rehabilitation of Shoushi's Adamyan Street

Common Notepad is the outcome of the Gyumri-Kars Urban Common Heritage project implemented jointly by the Urban Foundation for Sustainable Development and urbanlab. It aimed to promote a dialogue between Armenian and Turkish young urban planners and architects to join efforts in addressing the problem of protecting mainly the 19th-century urban heritage of Kars and Gyumri. These two cities shaped their urban structure and style during the Russian Empire period and had many similarities – built from the same tuff stone, in the same neo-classical style, etc.

The Conservation of Sevan Writers Resort project is funded by the Getty Foundation’s “Keeping it Modern” grant to Writers Union of Armenia. Sevan Writers Resort represents two different epochs in Soviet modernist architecture – the Residential building of 1930s early Soviet avant-garde era and the lounge structure of 1960s architecture of late Soviet Modernism, designed by two prominent Armenian architects Gevorg Kochar and Mikayel Mazmanyan.

Other Yerevan collaborative heritage management project is a unique virtual museum of important and alternative architectural heritage sites in contemporary Yerevan. It consists of mapping and promoting the culturally significant urban sites based on crowd-sourcing information processing. It will help preserve sites and structures that are still standing and commemorate those that have been lost to rapid urban re-structuring.

The Revitalization of Kond project initiated by urbanlab aims to re-evaluate the historical importance of the district and its role in the fabric of the city with a set of recommendations on how to revitalize the district without damaging the historic environment.

=== Advocacy and education ===
Since establishment, sharing of experience, non-formal education and advocacy for democratization of urban planning process has been one of the major directives of the organization.

A series of lectures titled “Meet Architecture”, organized by urbanlab for four consecutive seasons (2012–2013) at the Union of Architects of Armenia, were a success. The series hosted professionals of the field from Armenia and other countries, such as France, Germany, Austria, Romania, Iran and UK, and were attended by many students and interested individuals.

The organization also teamed up with official license holders of the local Pecha-Kucha Nights and organized two presentations on themes concerning urban planning and architectural issues. urbanlab has also been a partner of different educational programs, such as Bio Diversity and Built Environment Summer Course held at the American University of Armenia and City Hundretwasser workshop held at Cafesjian Centre for the Arts.

Started from 2011 urbanlab team has been organizing urban walks with a special focus on unconventional heritage sites of Yerevan, i.e. Kond, Lalayants Street, etc. In the framework of the same initiative, Yerevan participated in Jane's Walk movements and Faro Walks during European Heritage Days.

=== Publications ===
- Utopia and Collapse, Rethinking Metsamor – the Armenian Atomic City, Katharina Roters and Sarhat Petrosyan, Park Books, Zürich, Switzerland, 2018
- Independent Landscape, Mediapolis and urbanlab, Yerevan, 2016
- Analysis and Development of the Urban Planning Documentation System, self-published, 2013
- Study, Analysis and Development Program for Legislative Basis of the Protection of Historical and Cultural Monuments, self-published, 2012

=== Exhibitions ===
- Independent Landscape, Pavilion of Armenia at the 15th International Architecture Exhibition – La Biennale di Venezia, Venice, Italy, 2016
- Prague Architecture Week 2013, Prague, Czech Republic
- Scraps from the whole – the whole in scraps, urban planning exhibition, ACCEA, Yerevan, Armenia, 2013
- The Alternative Avenue, Yerevan Architecture Biennale, Museum Institute of Architecture, Yerevan, Armenia
