= Saint Gregory the Illuminator Church, Yerevan =

Church building in Yerevan, Armenia

Saint Gregory the Illuminator Church
- Սուրբ Գրիգոր Լուսավորիչ եկեղեցի
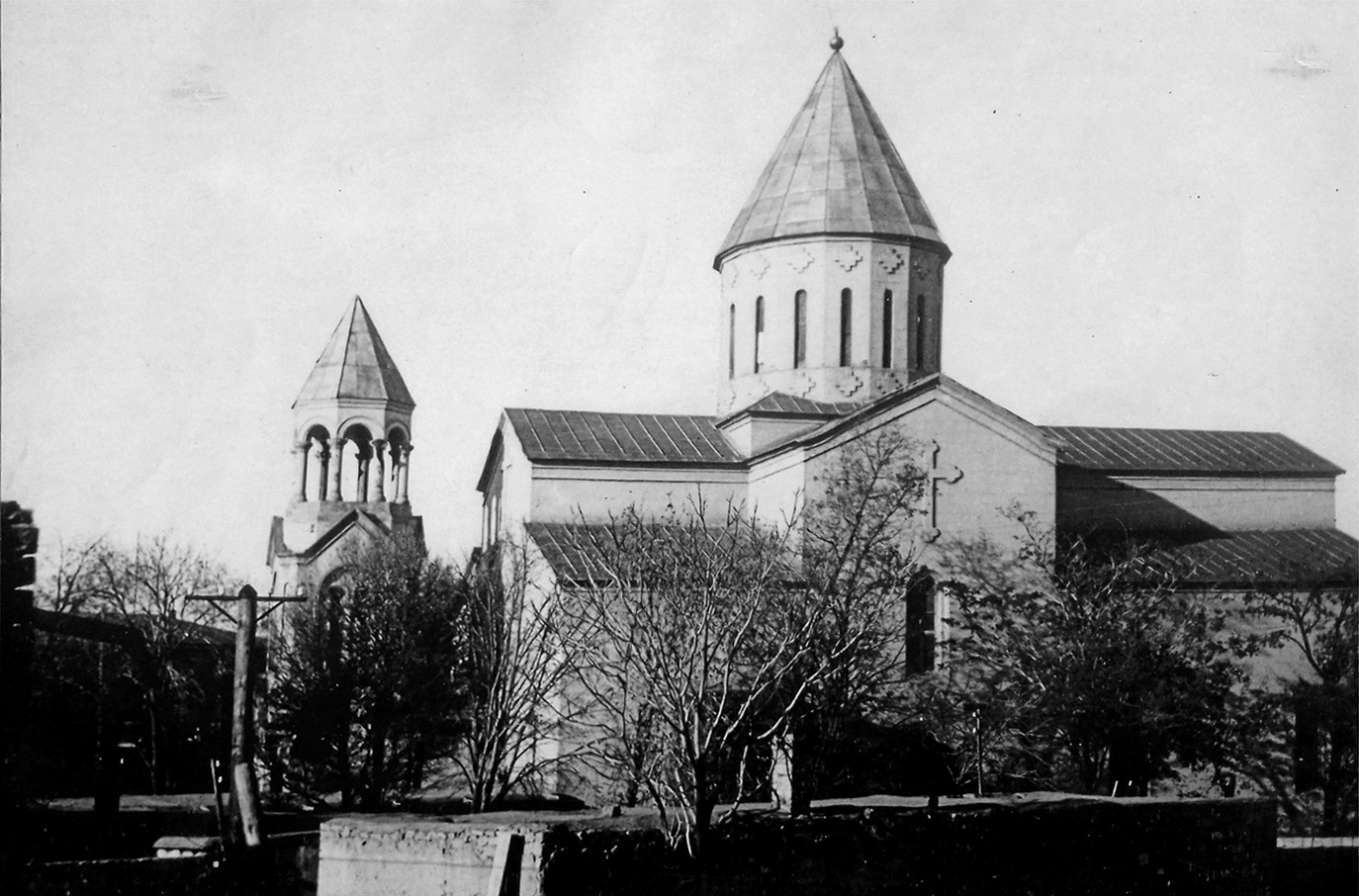
- Saint Gregory the Illuminator Church, 1900

- Location within Armenia

Religion
- Affiliation: Armenian Apostolic Church
- Status: Destroyed in 1939

Location
- Location: Yeghishe Charents School place, Kentron District; Yerevan, Armenia
- Coordinates: 40.179528°N 44.509111°E

Architecture
- Style: Armenian
- Groundbreaking: 1869
- Completed: 1900

Saint Gregory the Illuminator Church (Armenian: Սուրբ Գրիգոր Լուսավորիչ եկեղեցի, Surb Grigor Lusavorich yekeghets'i) was an Armenian Apostolic church in Yerevan, Armenia, that was destroyed in 1939. It was where Yeghishe Charents School is now on Amiryan Street, Yerevan.

== See also ==
- Saint Paul and Peter Church, Yerevan
- Gethsemane Chapel
- History of Yerevan
