= Gethsemane Chapel =

Armenian Apostolic church

Gethsemane Chapel Գեթսեմանի Մատուռ
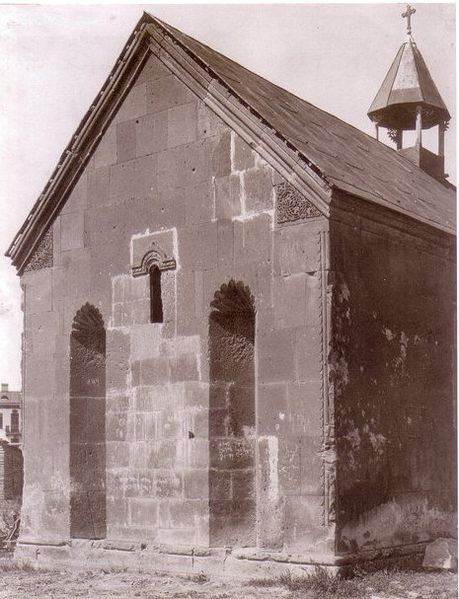
- Gethsemane Chapel in 1901

- Location within Armenia

Religion
- Affiliation: Armenian Apostolic Church
- Status: Destroyed in the 1920s

Location
- Location: Yerevan Opera Theater place, Kentron District; Yerevan, Armenia
- Coordinates: 40.185833°N 44.515100°E

Architecture
- Type: single-nave basilica with no dome
- Style: Armenian
- Completed: 1690s

Gethsemane Chapel (Armenian: Գեթսեմանի մատուռ, romanized: Get’semani matur’) was a small Armenian Apostolic church in the historical Shahar district of Yerevan, Armenia, that was destroyed during the 1920s to make way for the construction of the Yerevan Opera Theater on what is known today as Tumanyan street.

The Gethsemane Chapel was built by the end of the 17th century, replacing a 13th-century domed basilica ruined during the 1679 earthquake. However, the chapel of Gethsemane had a shape of single-nave basilica with no dome. It was surrounded by the old Yerevan cemetery.

It was entirely renovated in 1901 through the donation of the wealthy Yerevanian Melik-Aghamalyan family. The chapel was eventually destroyed during the 1920s.

== See also ==
- Saint Paul and Peter Church, Yerevan
- Saint Gregory the Illuminator Church, Yerevan
- History of Yerevan
