= Abovyan Street =

Street in Yerevan, Armenia

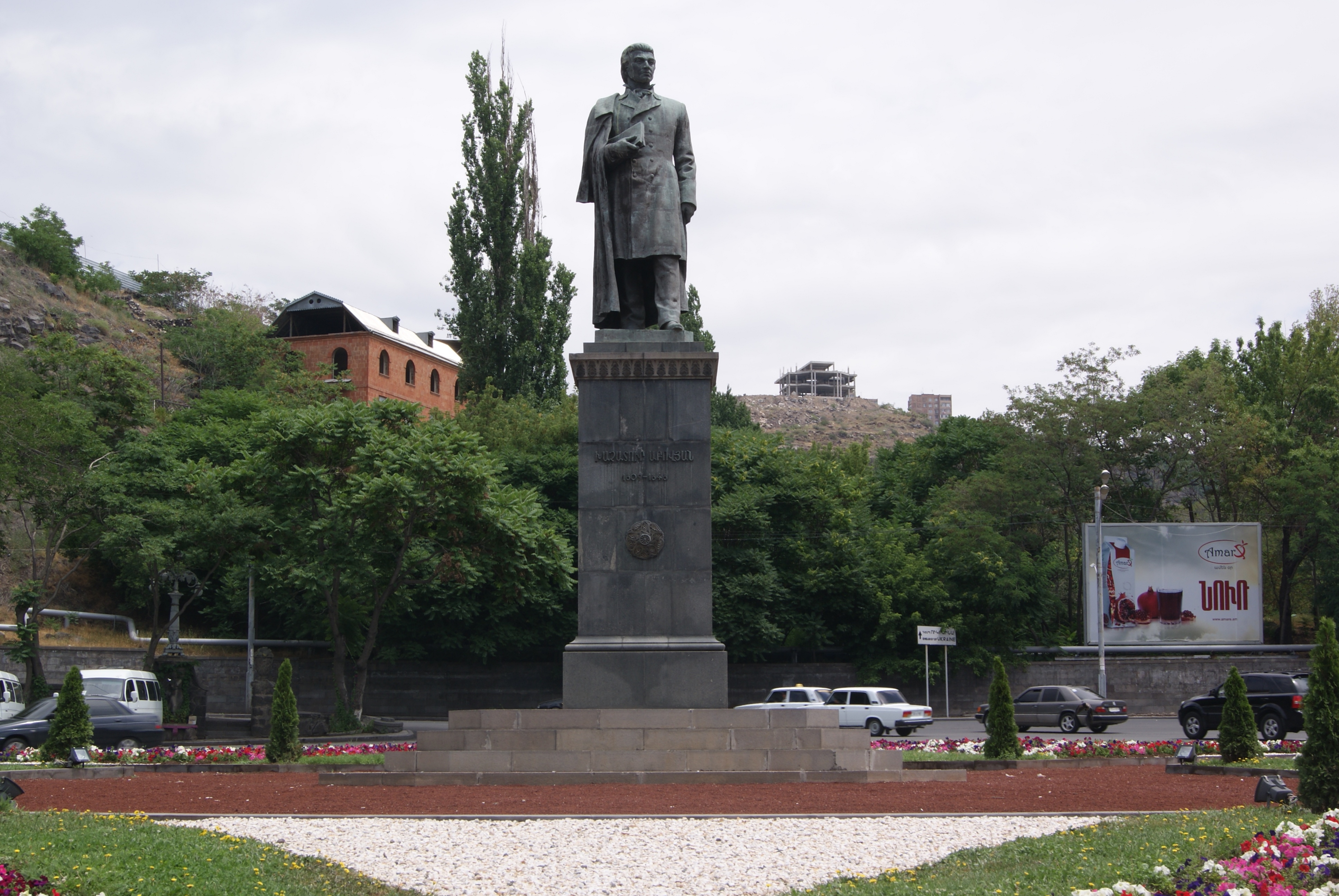
- The statue of Khachatur Abovian at the northern entrance to the street
- Interactive map of Abovyan Street
- Native name: Աբովյան փողոց (Armenian)
- Former name: Astafyan Street (1868-1920)
- Length: 1.8 km (1.1 mi)
- Location: Kentron District; Yerevan, Armenia

Construction
- Inauguration: 1863

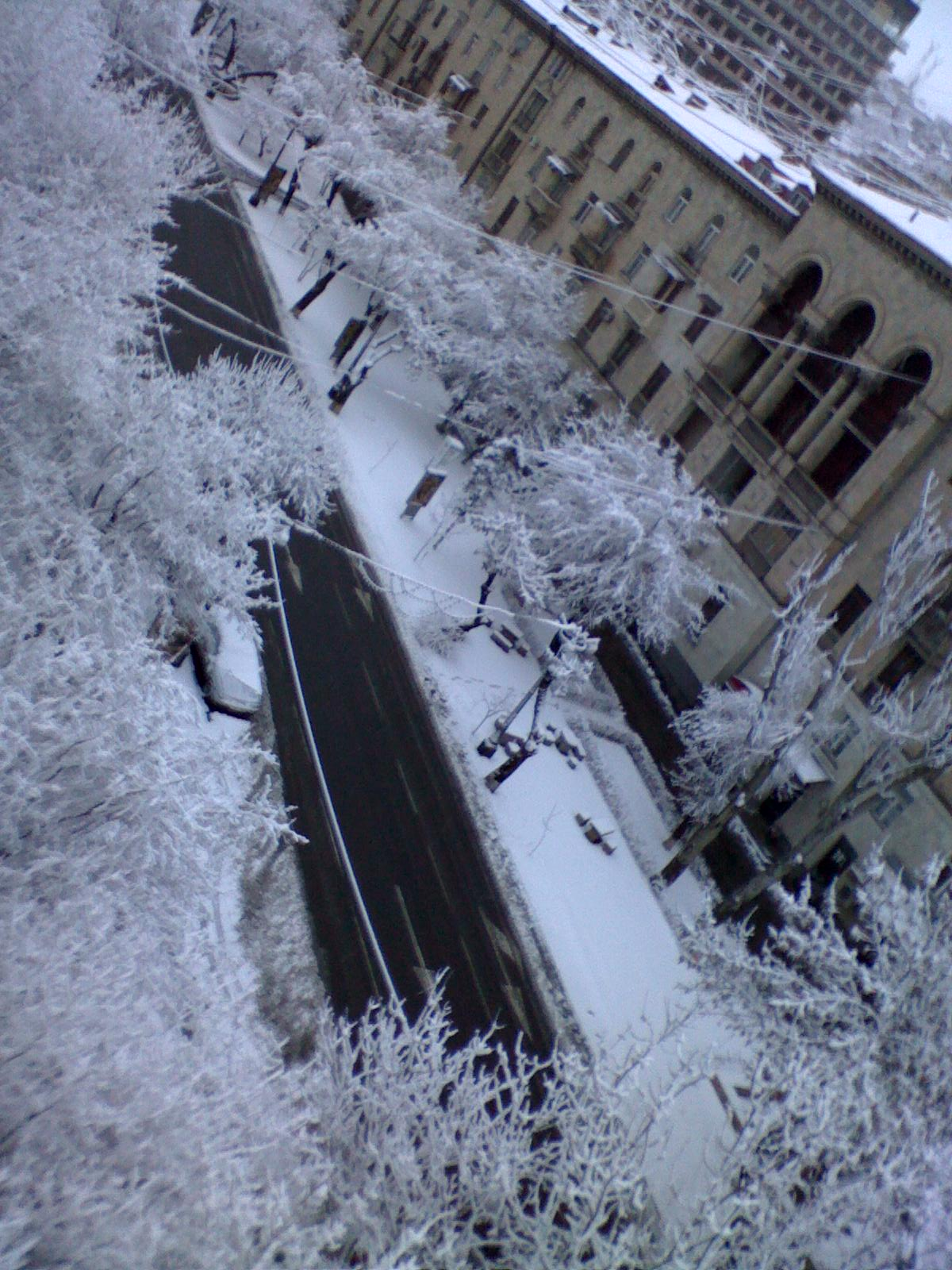
Abovyan Street in winter

Abovyan Street (Armenian: Աբովյան փողոց), is a street at the central Kentron district of the Armenian capital Yerevan. It was known as Astafyan Street between 1868 and 1920.

The street runs from the central Republic Square to the statue of prominent Armenian writer Khachatur Abovian (1809–1848), who the street is named after. Abovyan Street is the first planned street of the Armenian capital.

Located at downtown Yerevan, Abovyan Street is mainly home to cultural and educational institutions, luxurious residential buildings, elite brand shops, commercial offices, coffee shops, hotels, restaurants and night clubs. It is one of the main streets of Yerevan.

== History ==
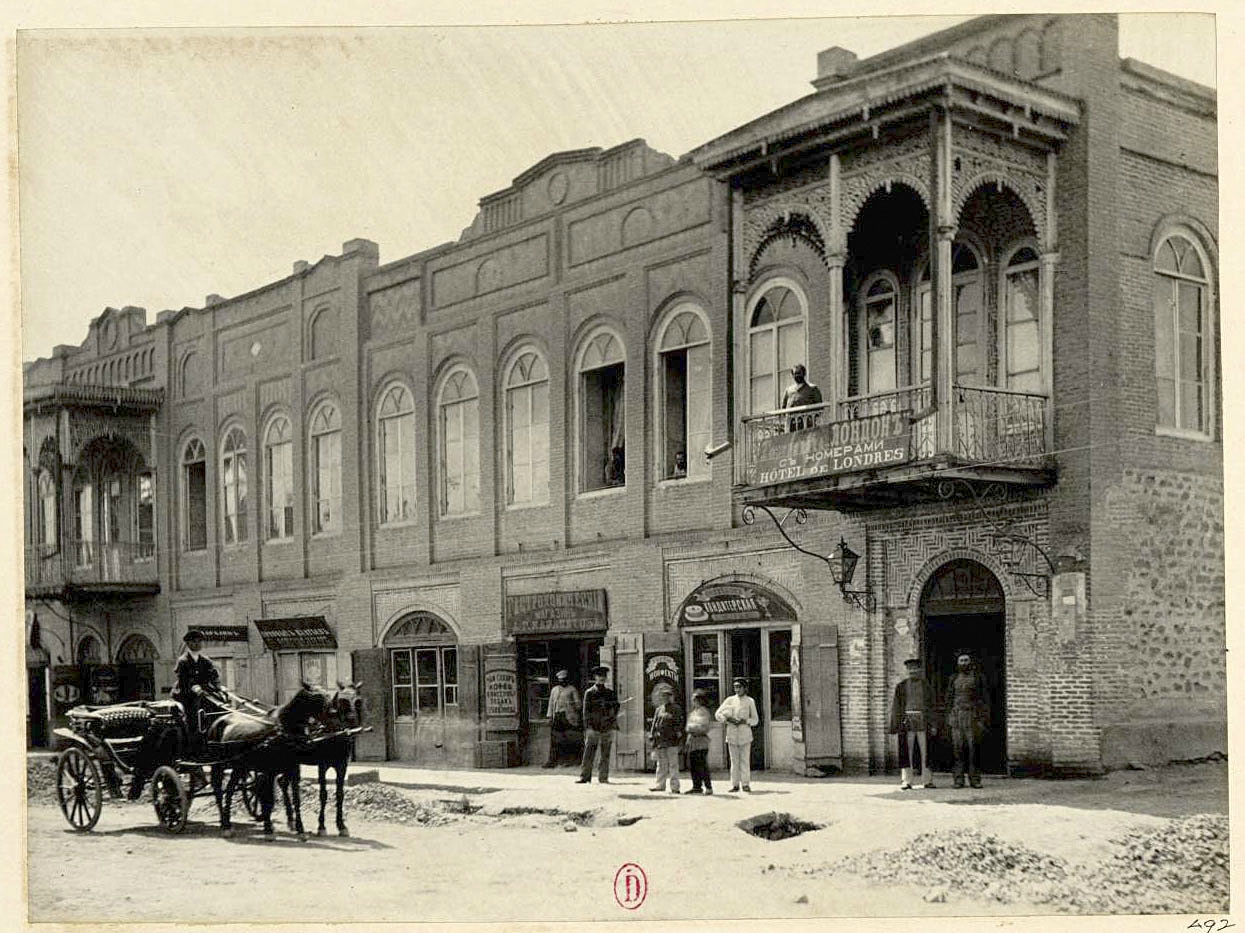
Hotel London in 1891

In 1855, the Russian viceroy of Caucasus confirmed the planning of Yerevan streets. The average width of the streets was planned to be from 6 to 20 meters. Astafayan Street was planned to be 20 meters wide. Astafyan was the first street in Yerevan that was built according to a certain plan. It was opened in 1863 and was named Astafyan after Mikhail Astafyev, the governor of the Erivan Governorate from 1860 to 1862.

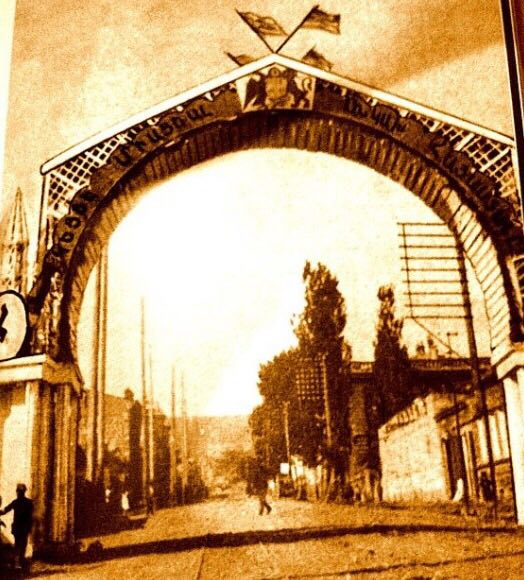
Triumphal arches, First Republic of Armenia

The street was officially called Astafyevskaya (Russian: Астафьевская улица), but the residents of Yerevan called it in their way – changing the suffix "-yevskaya" to "-yan". That was the main reason why it was known as Astafyan (Armenian: Աստաֆյան փողոց), not Astafyevskaya. In 1904, the horsecar system began to be constructed on Abovyan Street and was completed in 1906. It only operated 12 years, until 1918. The first tram in Yerevan passed on Abovyan Street in 1933. In 1920, at the start of the Soviet era, the street was renamed Abovyan street in honor of the father of modern Armenian literature. Numerous historical buildings stand on Abovyan street which quickly became well known in the city as the residence of famous people, celebrities, and politicians of Yerevan.

== Notable buildings ==
The street features prominent tsarist era mansions and art deco buildings from Yerevan's "Belle Epoque."

- Arno Babajanyan concert hall,
- Grand Hotel Yerevan,
- The Alexander, a Luxury Collection Hotel
- Ibis Yerevan Center,
- Artists' Union of Armenia,
- Moscow Cinema,
- Stanislavski Russian Theatre of Yerevan,
- The churches of Katoghike and Surp Anna,
- Yerevan State Medical University,

== Gallery ==
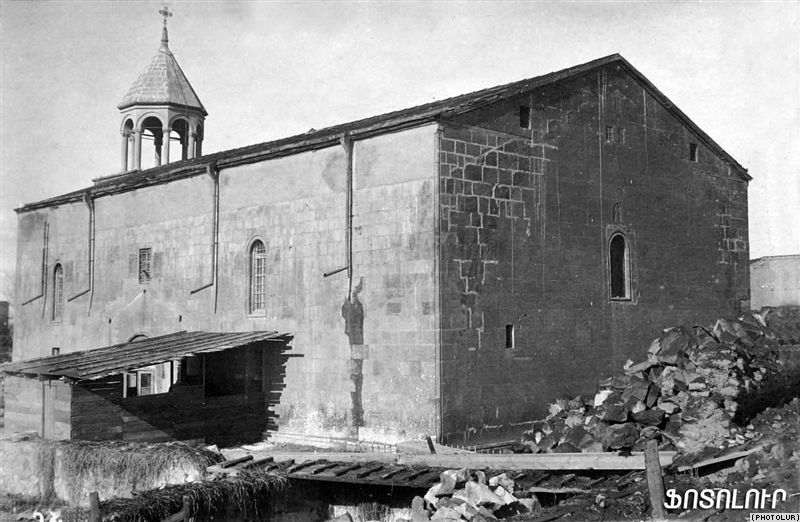
Saint Paul and Peter Church stood on the street until 1933 when it was destroyed

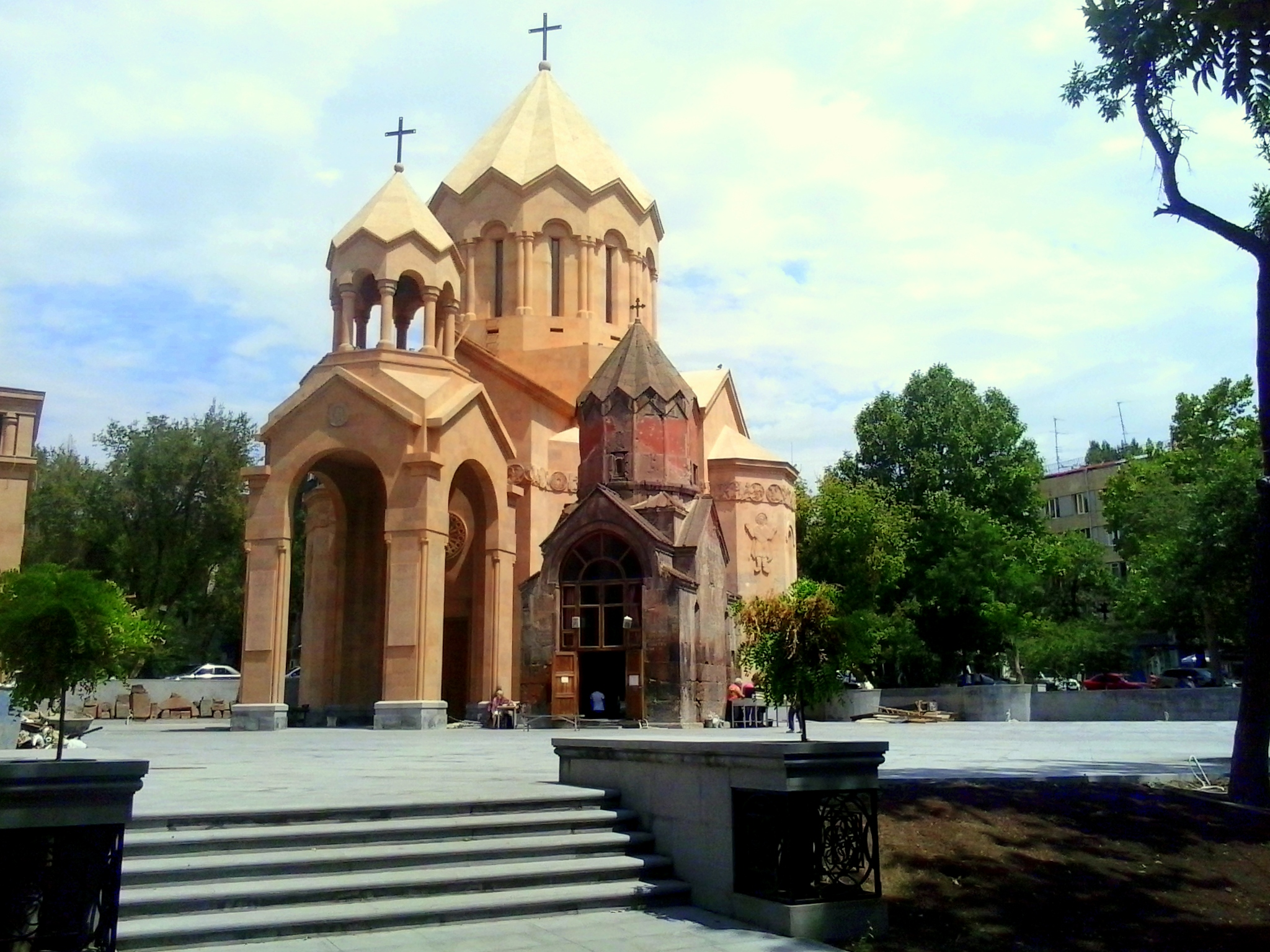
The churches of Katoghike and Surp Anna

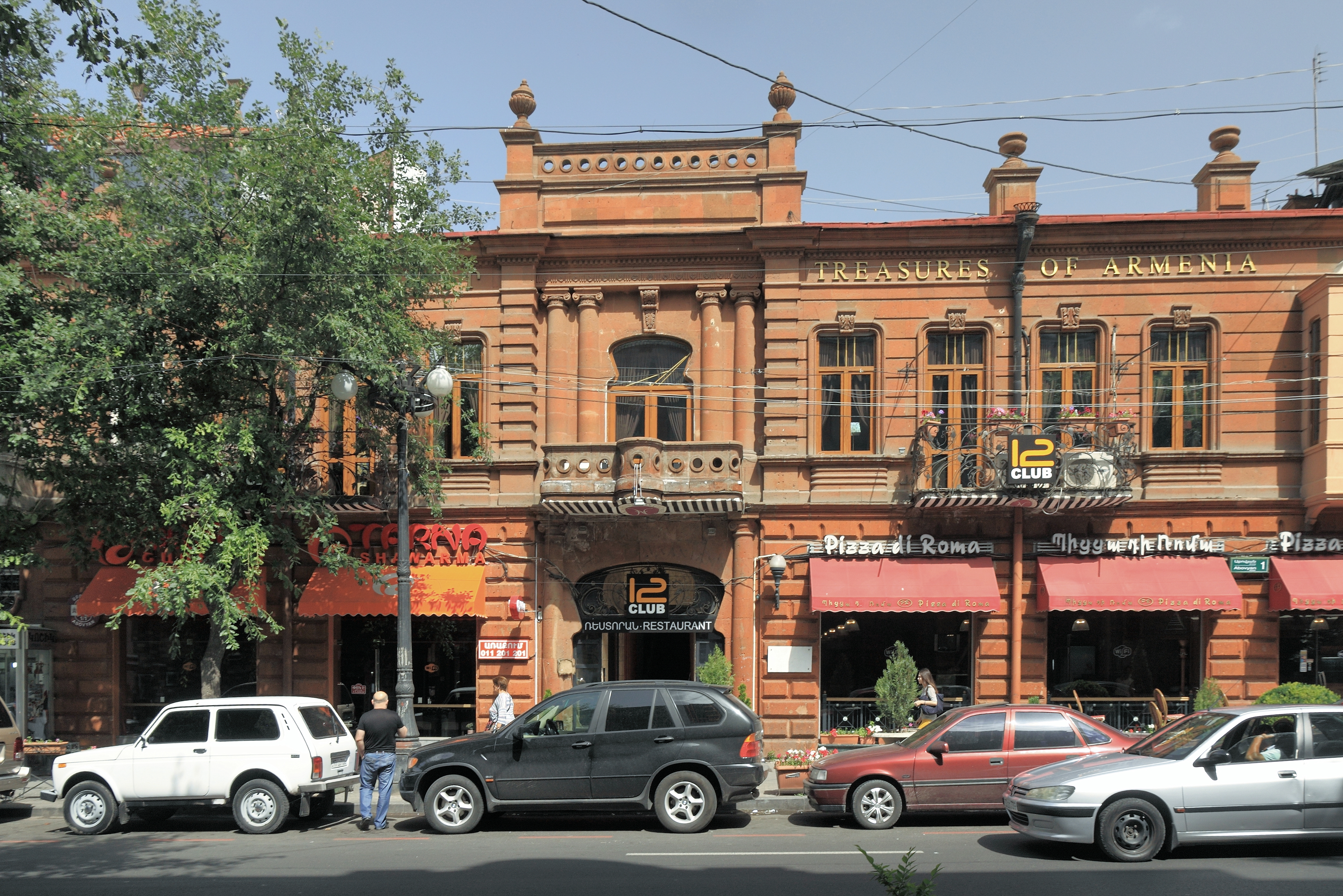
19th-century building on Abovyan street

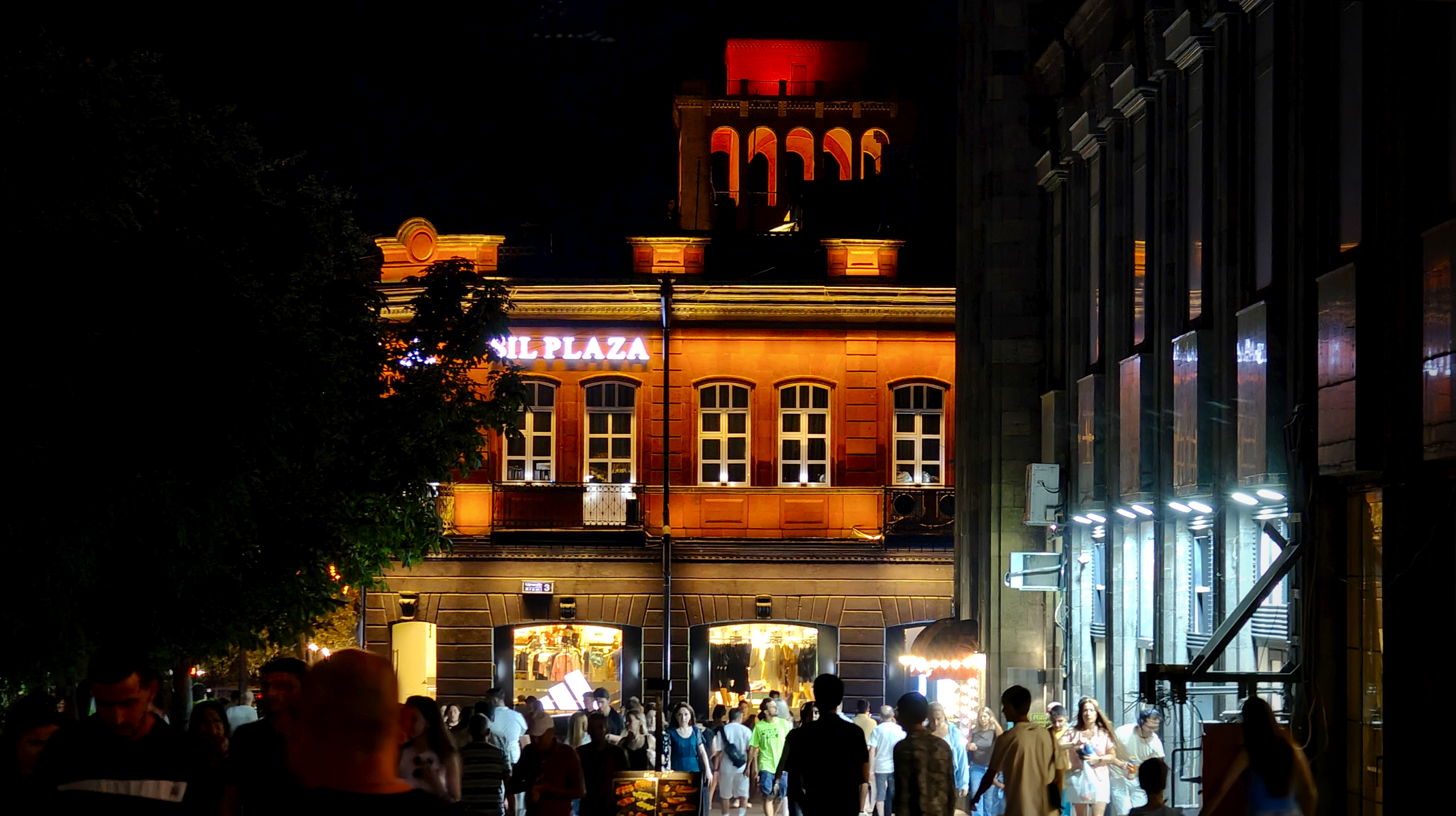
Abovyan street at night

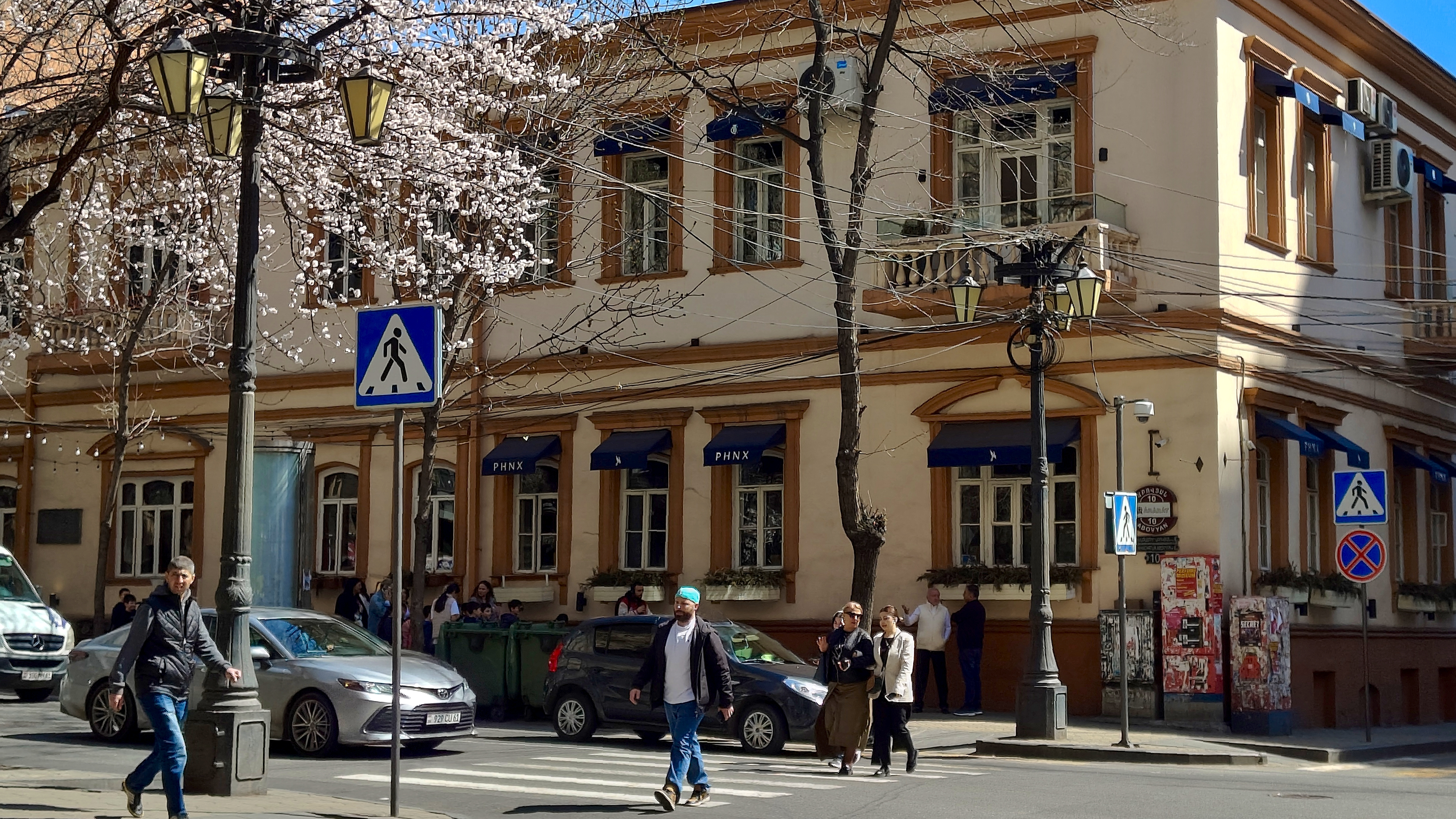
A 19th-century building

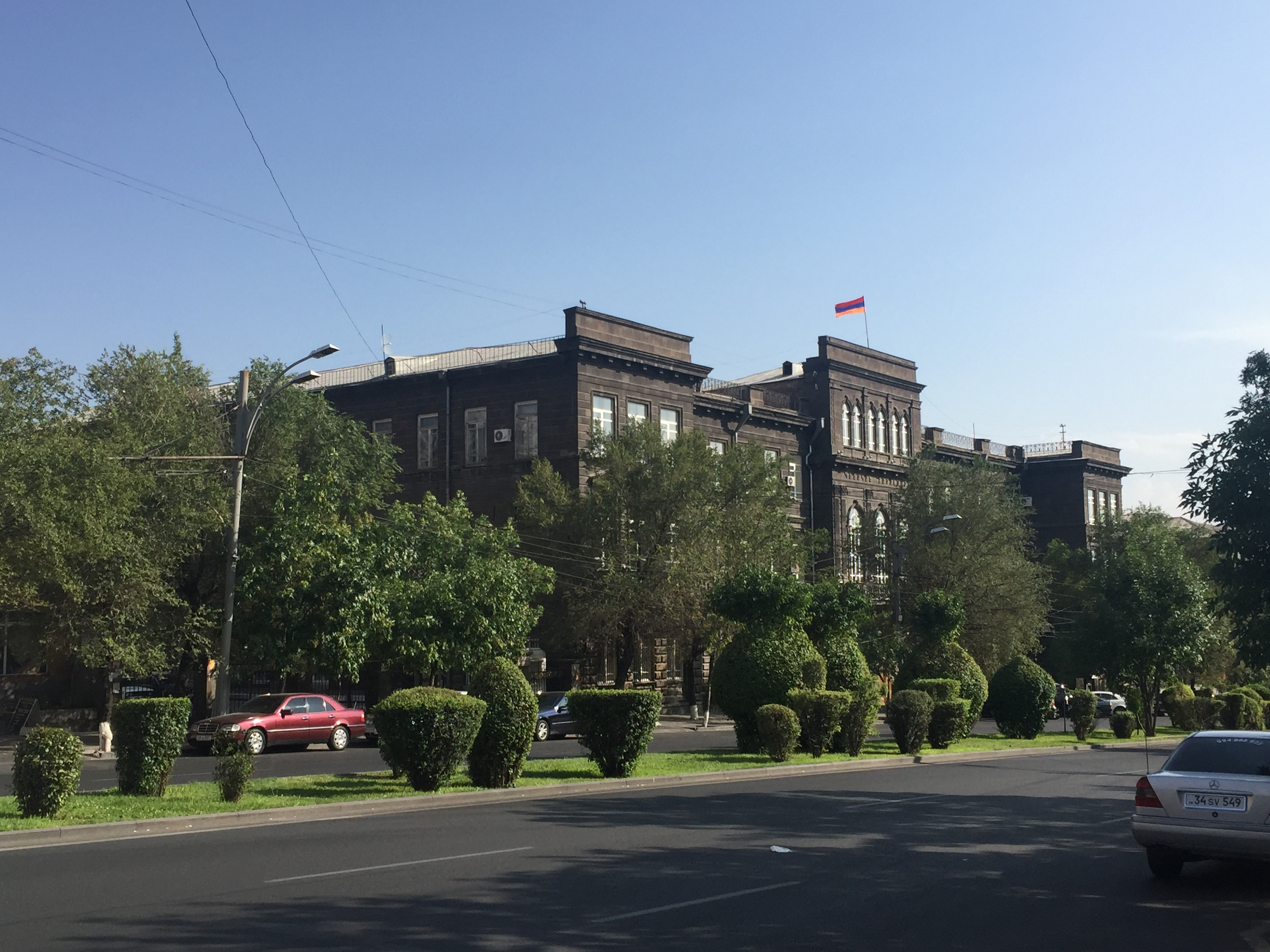
The 19th-century building of the YSU on 52 Abovyan, home to the Faculty of Theology, Faculty of History and Faculty of Economics and Management

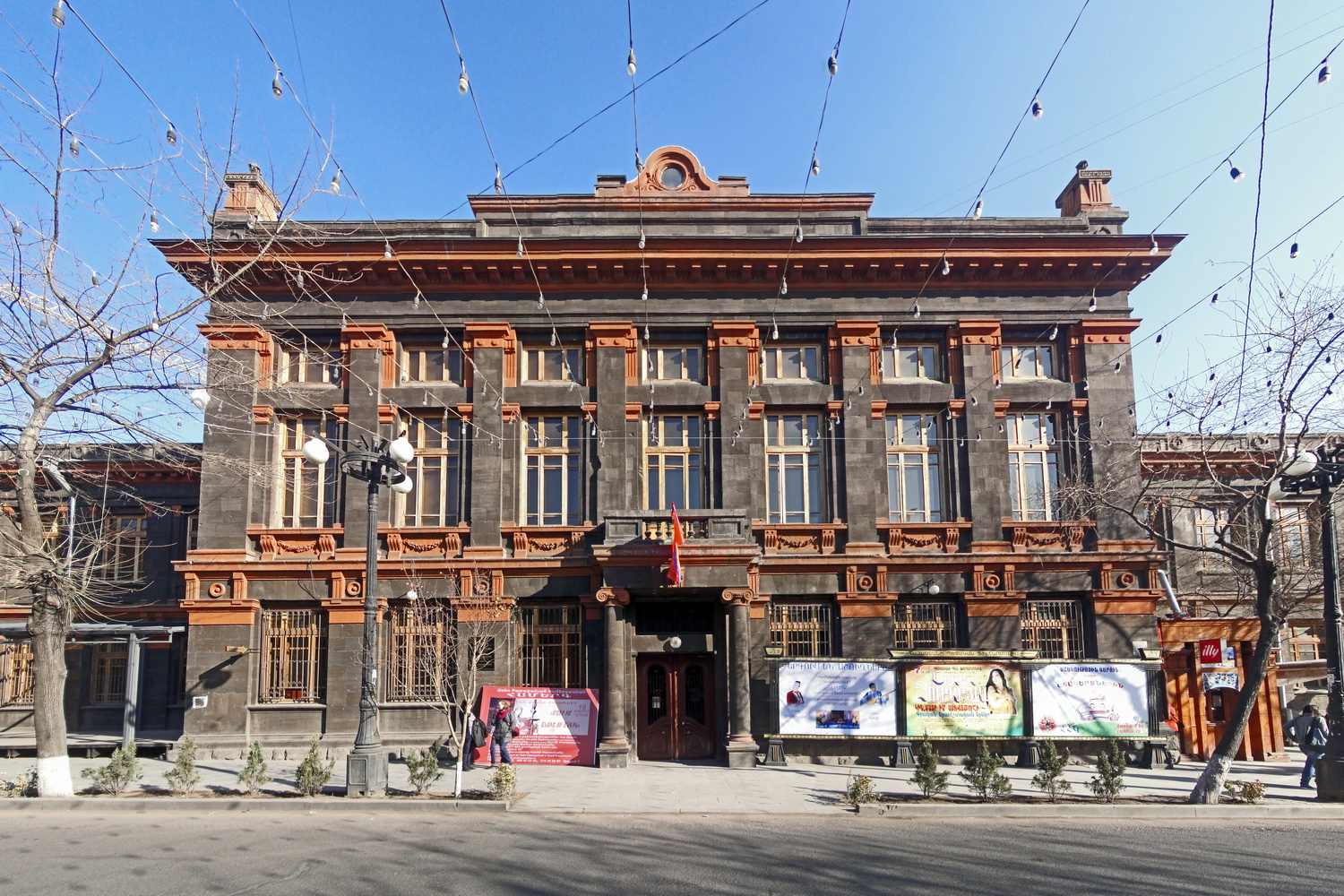
Arno Babajanian concerts hall at Abovyan Street

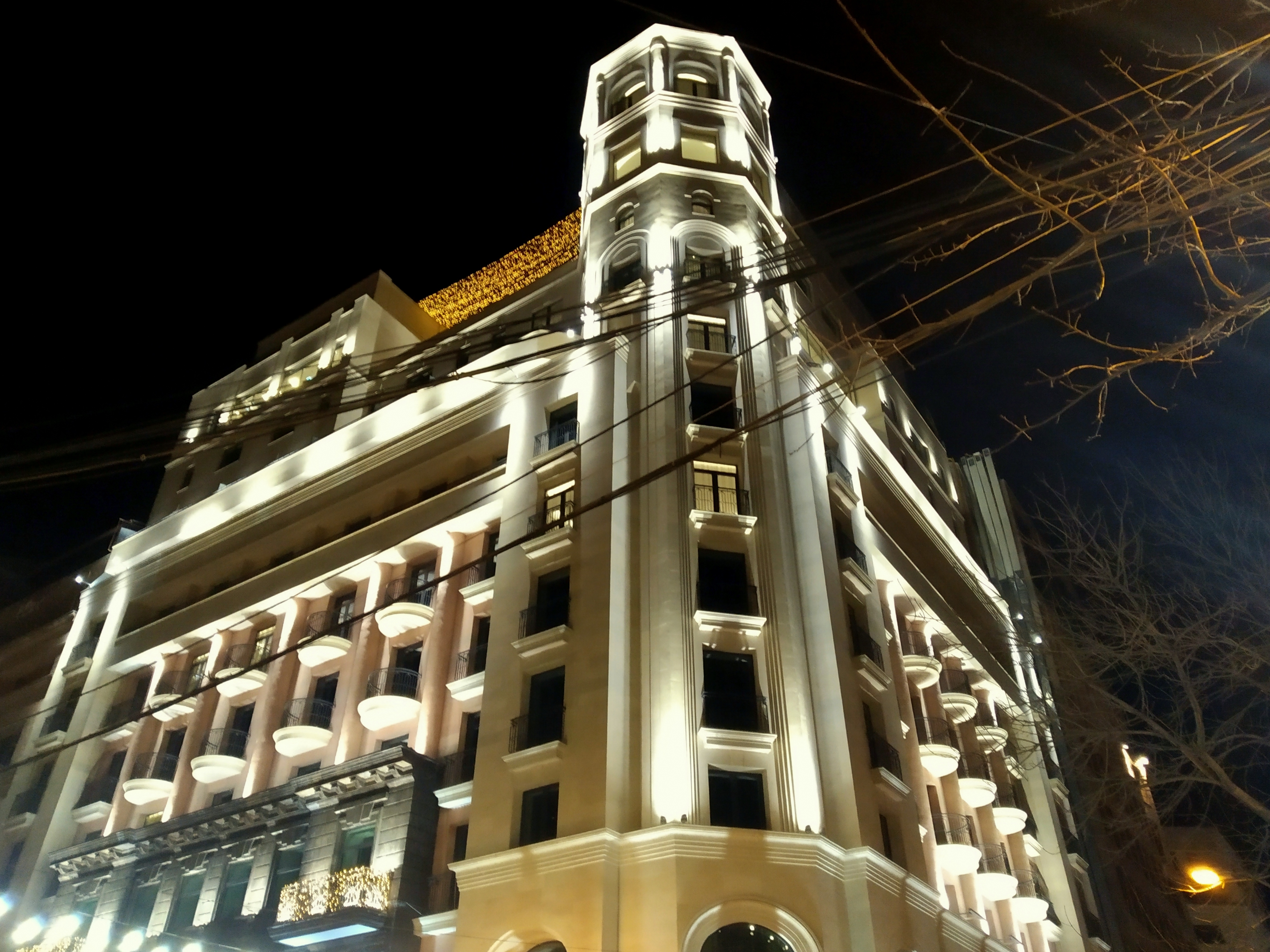
The Alexander, a Luxury Collection Hotel
