= Saint Nikolai Cathedral, Yerevan =

Former Russian Orthodox cathedral in Yerevan, Armenia

Saint Nikolai Cathedral
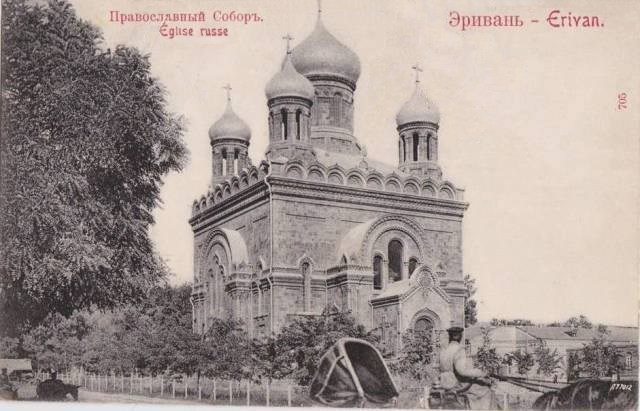

Religion
- Affiliation: Russian Orthodox Church
- Status: destroyed in 1931

Location
- Location: Stepan Shahumyan Square and statue place, Kentron District, Yerevan, Armenia
- Interactive map of Saint Nikolai Cathedral
- Coordinates: 40.176111°N 44.509444°E

Architecture
- Architects: Vasili Mirzoyan; N. Kitkin
- Style: Russian
- Completed: Second half of the 19th century

Saint Nikolai Cathedral (Russian: Николаевский собор, Armenian: Սուրբ Նիկոլայ Մայր եկեղեցի (Surb Nikolay Mayr yekeghets'i)) was a Russian Orthodox cathedral in Yerevan, Armenia. It was destroyed by Soviet forces in 1931. It was located at the site of what is now Shahumyan Square in Yerevan's Kentron District.

== History ==
The Russian Orthodox Cathedral of St. Nikolai was located in the middle of the north-eastern side of the Cathedral Square (now Shaumyan Square) area. According to O. Khalpahkhyan, this Russian military cathedral at the central square of Yerevan, was built in the second half of the 19th century. The cathedral was built by local red and black tufa in the architectural forms that prevailed at that time in Russia.

The cathedral was destroyed in 1931, and later Shahumyan Square was built in its place.

== Gallery ==
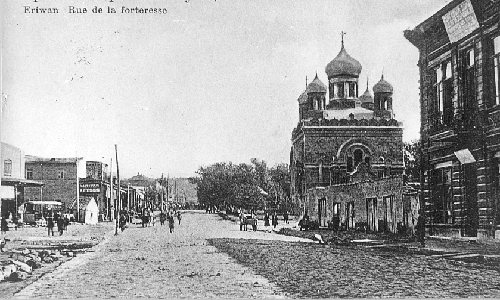
The cathedral with surrounding area in the Fortress St.

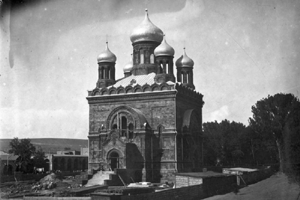
The façade

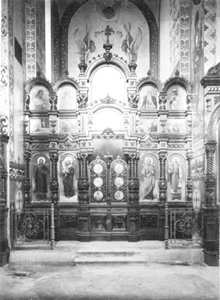
The altar

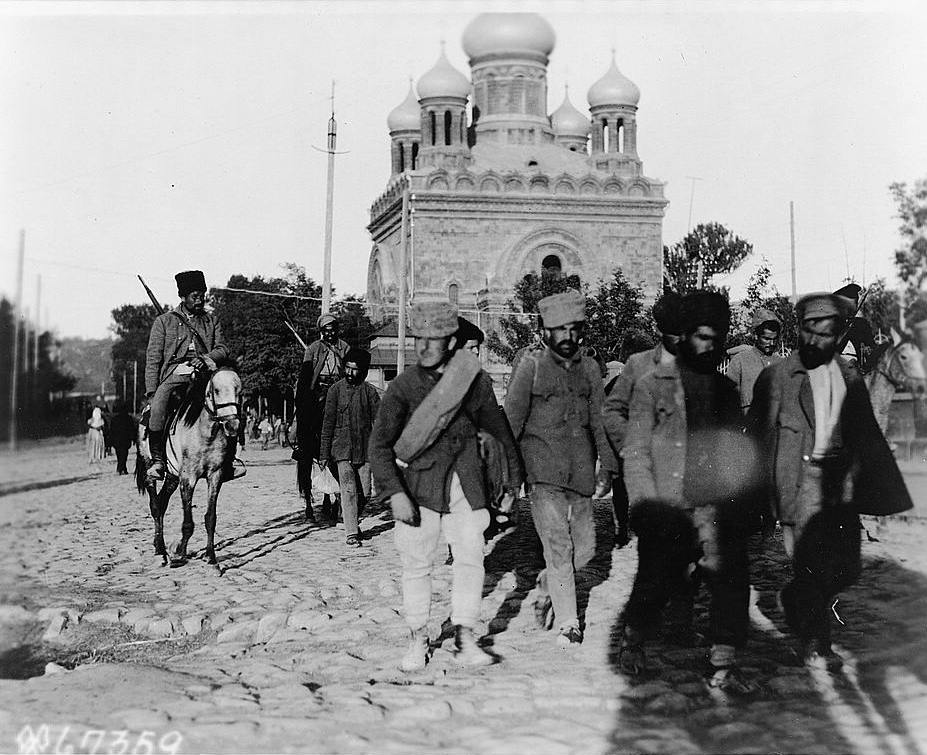
Armenian soldiers marching next to the church in 1919

== See also ==
- Russians in Armenia
- History of Yerevan
