= 1679 Armenia earthquake =

Earthquake in West Asia

- Location within Armenia
- Local date: June 4, 1679
- Magnitude: 6.4 M_{s}
- Epicenter: 40.2°N 44.7°E
- Areas affected: Yerevan Province, Safavid Iran
- Max. intensity: MMI IX (Violent)–MMI X (Extreme)
- Casualties: 7,600 dead

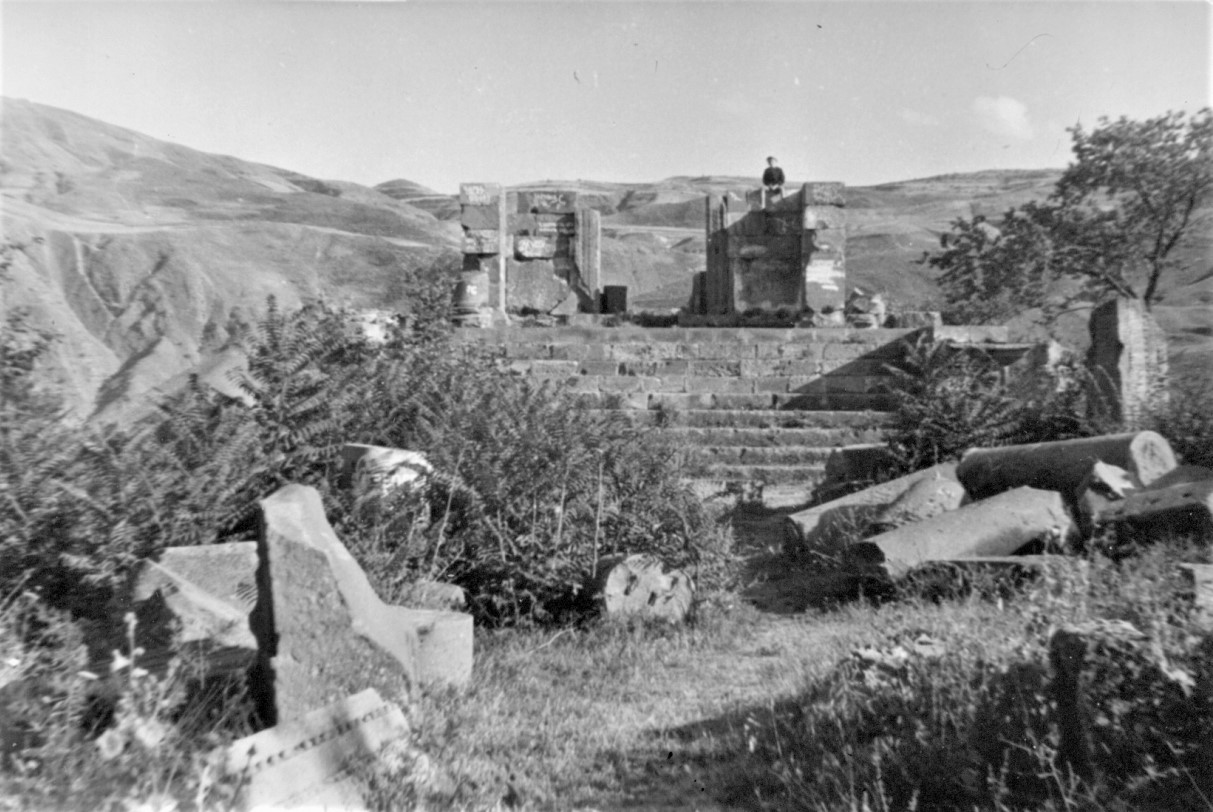
Ruins of the Garni temple in 1947

The 1679 Armenia earthquake (also called Yerevan earthquake or Garni earthquake) took place on June 4 in the Yerevan region of Armenia, then part of the Safavid Iran.

Numerous buildings were destroyed as a result of the earthquake. In Yerevan most notable structures were damaged. The Yerevan Fortress was destroyed, so were the following churches: Poghos-Petros, Katoghike, Zoravor and the Gethsemane Chapel.

Furthermore, the nearby Kanaker village was destroyed. The classical Hellenistic Temple of Garni also collapsed. Among many churches and monasteries that were reduced to ruins were Havuts Tar, Saint Sargis Monastery of Ushi, Hovhannavank, Geghard, and Khor Virap.

== Tectonic setting ==
Armenia lies within the northern part of the complex zone of continental collision between the Arabian plate and the Eurasian plate, which extends from the Bitlis-Zagros belt in the south to the Greater Caucasus Mountains, the Apsheron-Balkan Sill and the Kopet Dag mountains in the north. In Armenia the collision is strongly oblique with a large dextral (right lateral) strike-slip component. This has led to the development of a series of northwest–southeast trending dextral strike-slip fault zones. The largest of these, from south to north, are the Sardarapat-Nakhicheven fault, the Garni fault zone, Sunik fault zone, Kelbecer–Qubadlı fault and the Çıldır-Sevan fault zone, all of which are seismically active.

== Earthquake ==
A series of locations have been proposed for the epicentre, from just north of Yerevan to >10 km east of Garni. Estimated magnitudes are similarly varied, ranging from 5.5 to 7.0, and the seismic intensity at the epicentre ranges from VIII to X. The date is generally accepted as June 4, but the time is variously described as 04:00, 06:00 and 16:00. In 2003, a complete re-evaluation of the original sources led to a revised set of parameters. The revised epicentre is close to Garni, the estimated magnitude is 6.7 M_{e} (equivalent magnitude - intended to match the moment magnitude scale from intensity data) and the epicentral intensity is X on the MCS scale. By taking account of the different systems in use at the time of the earthquake, a local time of about 10:30 to 11:45 is preferred.

The fault that caused earthquake is thought to be the Garni Fault, which is a mainly dextral structure, with a component of reverse faulting. A horizontal displacement of about 300 m has been estimated for this fault, with a horizontal slip rate of 3.0±0.5 mm per year and vertical slip-rate of 0.3–0.4 mm per year. Movement on the northernmost segment of this fault was responsible for the 1988 Spitak earthquake.

== Impact ==
=== Casualties ===
The figure of about 7,600 deaths appears in many later sources, derived from the writings of Zackaria of Aghoulis in which he appears to refer to the total for Yerevan Province. Other sources imply much higher rates of fatalities, such as Zackaria of Kanaker, who reported that the dead outnumbered the survivors and that 1,228 died in his own village of Kanaker. Another source gives a total death toll of 50,000.

== See also ==
- Iranian Armenia (1502–1828)
- List of earthquakes in Armenia
- List of historical earthquakes
