= Saints Peter and Paul Church, Yerevan =

Church in Yerevan, Armenia

Saint Paul and Peter Church Սուրբ Պողոս-Պետրոս Եկեղեցի
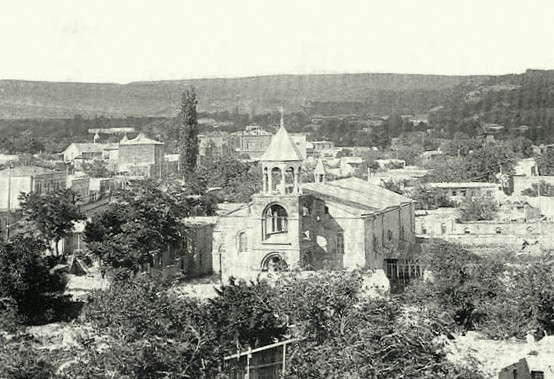
- Saint Paul and Peter Church

- Location within Armenia

Religion
- Affiliation: Armenian Apostolic Church
- Status: destroyed in 1930

Location
- Location: Corner Astafyan (Abovyan) and Bzhshkakan (Tumanyan) streets Kentron District, Yerevan, Armenia
- Coordinates: 40.181744°N 44.517383°E

Architecture
- Type: Late medieval single-nave basilica with no dome
- Style: Armenian
- Completed: 5th-6th centuries; Rebuilt late 17th century

Saint Paul and Peter Church (Armenian: Սուրբ Պողոս-Պետրոս Եկեղեցի; Surp Poghos-Petros yekeghetsi) was an Armenian Apostolic church in Yerevan, Armenia originally built during the 5th-6th centuries. It was demolished in November 1930 to make room for the Moscow Cinema on Abovyan Street.

== History ==
According to Armenian historian Karo Ghafadaryan, the church of Saint Peter and Paul was the oldest and biggest church in old Yerevan. It was not the only church in old Yerevan. In fact, when in 607 AD the newly elected Catholicos of Armenia Abraham I assembled a meeting at the city of Dvin, he invited clergymen from territories controlled by the Byzantine Empire as well as two priests from Yerevan. Therefore, this tells us that in old Yerevan there were at least two large churches. In the 17th century, French traveler Jean Chardin visited Yerevan. In his description about the city he mentioned that there were numerous churches in old Yerevan, but did not mention a church with the name of "Surp Poghos-Petros."

In 1679, a calamitous earthquake leveled much of the city and destroyed many structures in the neighboring regions. Amongst the structures that lay in ruin was the church of Saint Peter and Paul. A portion of the eastern section of the church survived, and the rest was soon rebuilt from its ruins. The newly reconstructed church went by the same name as its predecessor.

There are not any known historical references to the rebuilding of Poghos-Petros Church. Most likely, the church was reconstructed toward the end of the 17th century. Ghafadaryan found the years 1691 and 1692 inscribed upon some of the khachkars built into the church's eastern and northern walls. From two inscriptions Karo Ghafadaryan found that further restoration efforts had taken place again in later years. The first inscription, located upon the arch of the southern façade, tells that the church was restored in 1778. In the second inscription, inscribed onto the northern wall, states that the church was restored in 1820 with the financial assistance of the city's residents.

=== Destruction ===
In November 1930, the Saint Paul and Peter Church was destroyed by the Soviet regime to build Moscow Cinema. Many khachkars and religious structures such as churches, chapels, and shrines were destroyed across the country during this time to eliminate religion. Some fragments of the church's walls and wall-paintings survived. They are now displayed in the Yerevan History Museum and History Museum of Armenia.

== New church and public controversy ==
On February 25, 2010 the Armenian government approved a proposal to manage Moscow Cinema Ltd. and to acquire the land currently occupied by the cinema's outdoor theater on Abovyan Street in favour of the Mother See of Holy Etchmiadzin, for the purpose of building a new church at the site of what was once the church of Poghos-Petros.

The decision initiated some protests among the public. After the plan was announced, a group named Save Moscow Cinema Open-Air Theater enlisted some 5,000 members and collected over 18,000 signatures during the petition to stop the project. The group addressed Catholicos Karekin II of Armenia as well as the Armenian Prime Minister Tigran Sargsyan, calling for a thorough public debate about the proposal and they are still waiting for their replies.

Many Armenian architects and intellectuals in have spoken in defense of the open-air theater. More than 60 Armenian intellectuals sent an open letter to Armenian Prime Minister Tigran Sargsyan with a request to revise the decision on construction of a church at the place of the open-air cinema hall. The project is seen by some critics as another example of the expanding influence of the Armenian Church into state affairs. In response, representatives of the Armenian Church have accused critics of the construction project of "lacking due respect for God." However, the plan was later withdrawn due to the limited space of the location.

== Gallery ==
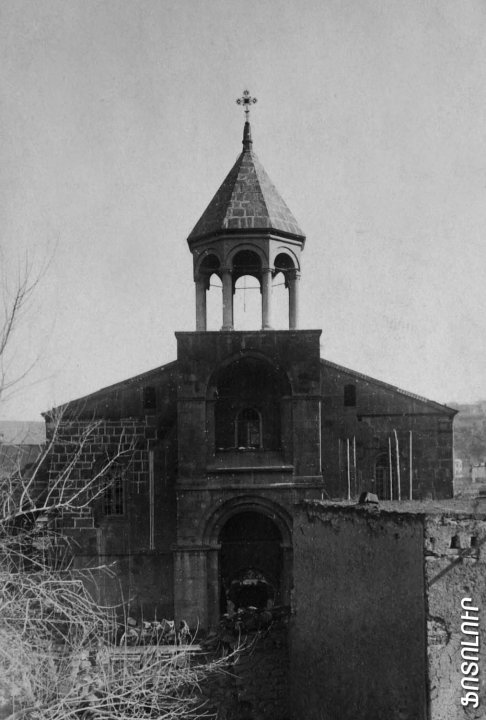
The belfry at the entrance

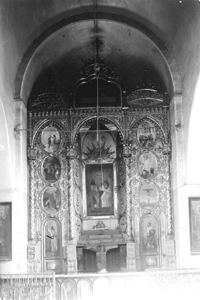
The altar and apse

== See also ==
- Gethsemane Chapel
- Saint Gregory the Illuminator Church, Yerevan
- History of Yerevan
