= History of Yerevan =

History of the capital city of Armenia

The history of modern Yerevan, the capital of Armenia, traces its roots back to Erebuni Fortress an ancient Urartian fortified monument from which also the modern city of Yerevan derives its name. The earliest reference to Yerevan in the medieval records dates from 607 A.D. Located one in the bottommost parts of the Armenian Highlands, the city lies on the banks of the rivers Getar and Hrazdan, the easternmost end of the Ararat Plain (historically, the ancient Armenian province of Ayrarat). Several ancient and medieval Armenian capitals are situated in the vicinity of Yerevan. From the early 15th century onwards, the city was the administrative center of the Safavid Empire; in the mid-18th century it was proclaimed the capital of the Erivan Khanate, in 1918 - the capital of the First Republic of Armenia and in - 1920 - the capital of Armenian Soviet Socialist Republic. Since 1991, Yerevan has been the capital of the Third Republic of Armenia.

== Name ==
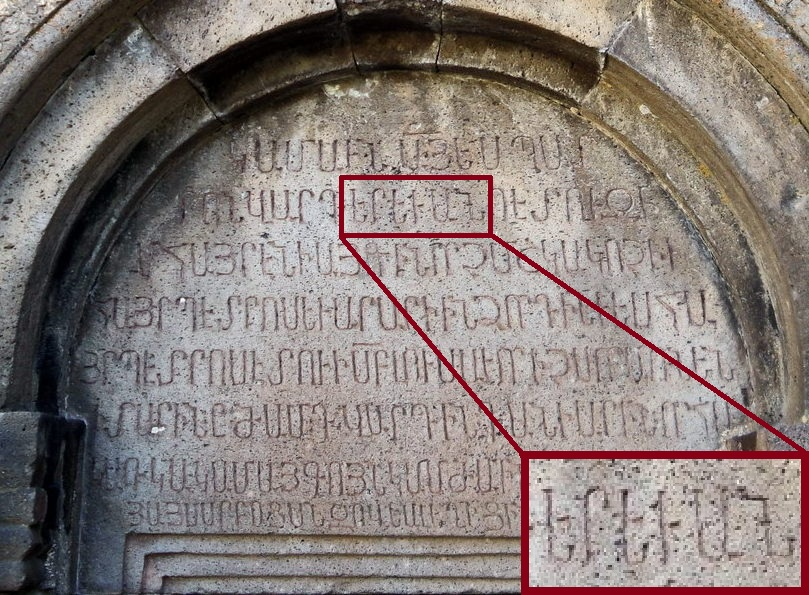
"YEREVAN" (ԵՐԵՒԱՆ) in an inscription from Kecharis, dating back to 1223

The name "Yerevan" derives its origins from the Erebuni Fortress. As noted by Anne Elizabeth, a British scholar from Newcastle University, a number of Armenian toponymies and family names have either retained or contain a certain reminiscence of the earlier substratum. The name Erebunni was retained in Yerevan, whereas Tushpa bears resemblance to Tospa. In the Middle Ages, the city was known with the name Yerevan. In a Sevanavank record dating from 874 A.D., we find "յԵրեւան" as a form of reference. In foreign language sources, the forms Ervan, Erivan, Revan, Irevan, Errevant, Ervan, Erivan, Revant were traditionally used alongside Yerevan.

== Ancient period ==
With its geographic location in an area populated for many centuries, Yerevan is historically in one of the most fertile parts of Armenia. The commonly accepted viewpoint is that the city derives its name from the Erebuni Fortress, which was built in the 8th century B.C. Earlier, Wilhelm Eilers stated in his records that the Armenian word vank (monastery - translator's note) originated from the verbs erewim/erewec (emerged, appeared). The opinion was based on the folk etymology associated with the legend on the landing of Noah's Ark on Mount Ararat. The ancient fable thus ascribed the foundation of the city to Noah's time. French traveler Jean Chardin who visited Yerevan in the late 17th century, wrote: "According to the Armenians, Yerevan is the world's oldest settlement; their legend says that Noah resided there with his family both before, and after, the deluge as he left the mountain on which the ark rested". Long before the discovery of the inscription on the mound Arin Berd, there were available records about Erebuni from another inscription carved by King Argishti of Urartu on a rock in the vicinity of Van (the south-eastern outskirts of Yerevan). It contained a message on the resettlement 600,000 warriors in the province of Tsupa (Sophene). As a result, also other inscriptions on the city's foundation were discovered in 782 B.C. Those first residents of the city had mixed Proto-Armenian-Luwian-Hurrian roots which, apparently, brought here the Proto-Armenian language. Erebuni was an economic, political and military center of Urartu, serving as a residence during military campaigns against the northern neighbors. The town continued existing also after the fall of Urartu. In the Achaemenid epoch, numerous redevelopment activities were carried out; new buildings were constructed.

== Middle Ages ==
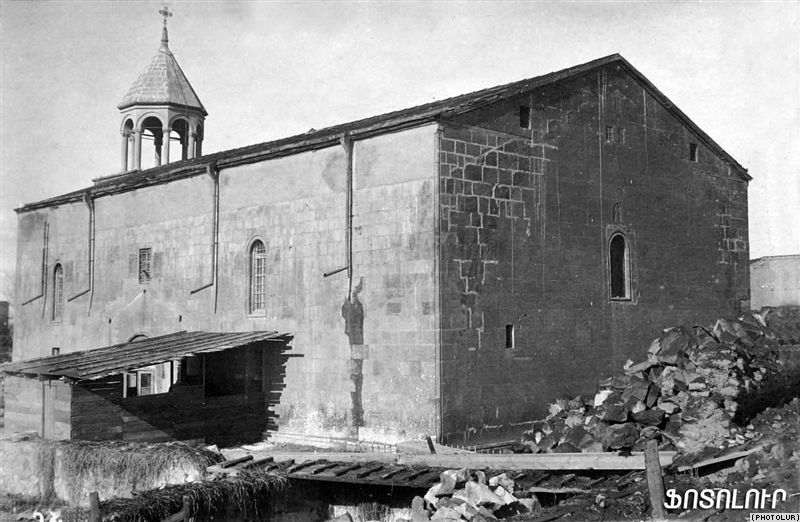
Saint Paul and Peter Church, 6th-7th centuries

The earliest reference to Yerevan in the Armenian sources is found in the Book of Letters. A document dating from 607 A.D. contains records about Daniel, a priest from Yerevan who, during the First Council of Dvin, relinquished the Chalcedonian creed upon the demand of Catholicos Abraham. It is known that at the time, the Saint Paul and Peter Church, constructed presumably in the 6th or the early 7th century, already existed in Yerevan. Clifford Edmund Bosworth describes Yerevan as one of those Armenian cities which, located in the Aras River Valley, saw many wars and battles in the Middle Ages. James Howard-Johnston classifies Yerevan among the cities which, in the early 7th century, was in the zone of the Byzantine-Sassanian wars. Also Sebeos, a 7th-century historian, made a reference to the city in the form Hērewan (as well as its fortress) in connection with the Arab invasion of Armenia. "They came and gathered near Erivan, battled with the fortress but were unable to seize it". Sources dating from a later period cite Tsitetsernakaberd as the main citadel of Yerevan. John Skylitzes, a Byzantine historian of the 13th and 14th centuries, refers to it in the form Chelidonion. In 1047, the fortress was under Byzantine occupation, and several years earlier, it had been seized from the Armenian kingdom of Bagratids by Abu'l-Aswar Shaddadid. The strategic significance of Yerevan is also emphasized in records dating from the Bagratid Kingdom of Armenia. Hovhannes Draskhanakerttsi refers to the small town of Yerevan in an early 10th century description: "At the time, they say a fighting was going on in the vicinity of the qaghaqagyugh [village-turned-town] of Yerevan. The circumstances of the war were made known to you by those who had given their description earlier". No records are available about the exact date of the event. Samuel Anetsi, a 12th-century historian, writes, without reference to earlier sources, about the siege of Yerevan in 660 A.D. A small town under the Bagratids, it developed ties with the neighboring regions in connection with the country's economic progress. In a record dating from the 13th century, Mekhitar of Ayrivank says that Prince Apirat "... built Kecharus and constructed the channel to Erivani".

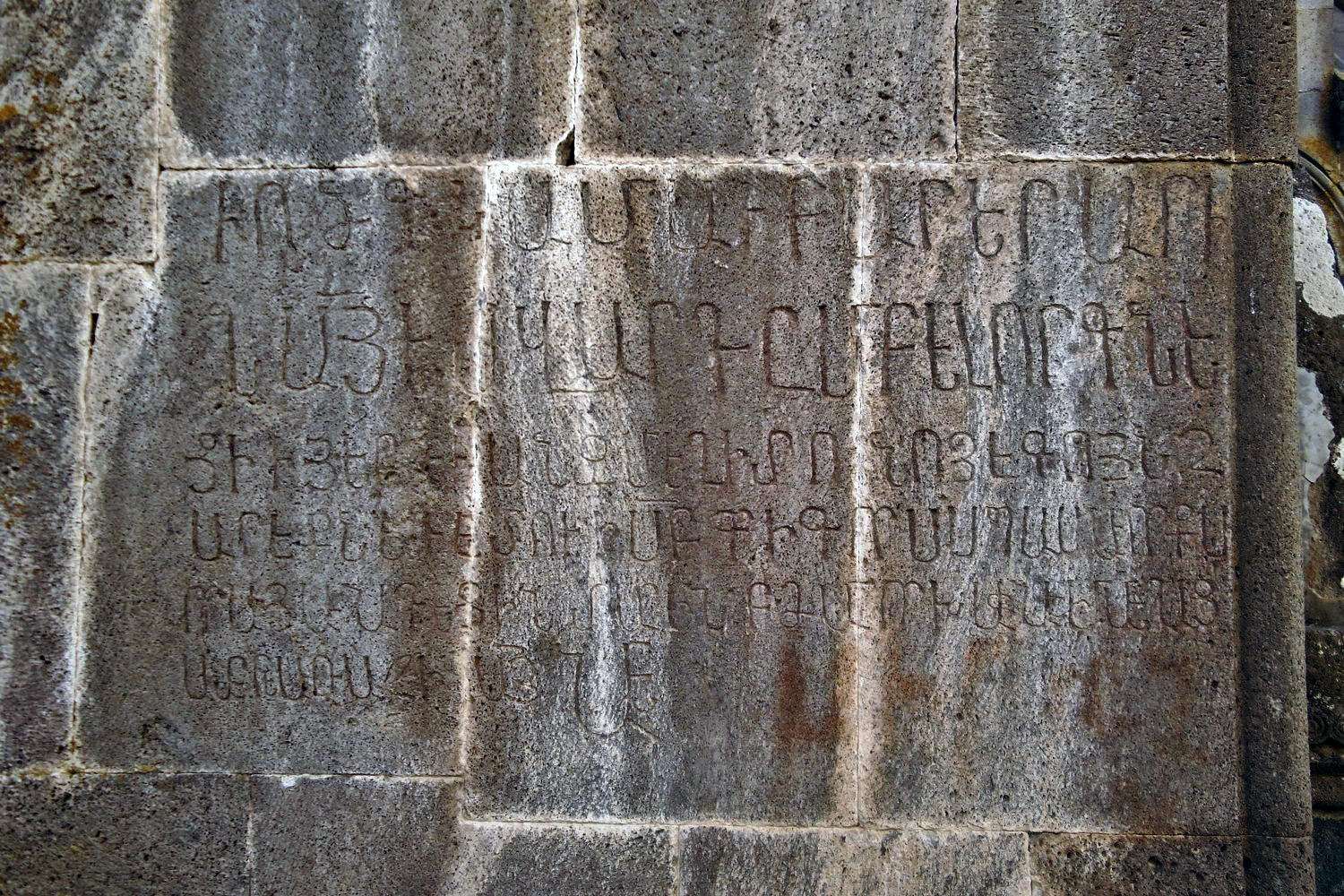
"Yerevan" in an inscription, dating back to 1204

Stepanos Orbelyan sheds light upon an inscription dating from the second half of the 9th century and containing a reference to Yerevan. It is believed that Prince Grigor of Syunik established it in Mekenyats Monostery on the southern coast of Sevan. Orbelyan believed that the vineyards of Yerevan were a gift by Mekenyats Monastery and Sevanavank. The earliest inscription referring to Yerevan was carved in Sevanavank in 874 A. D. Yerevan, as a town, is also referred to in lapidary inscriptions dating from 901, 981, 1201 and 1204. The name "Yerevan" was preserved in a 1264 inscription on the wall of the St. Katoghike Church in the city's center.

Between the 11th and 13th centuries, Yerevan turned into a feudal city already known as the capital of Kotayk province. Vardan the Great, in his mid-13th century "Geography", states: "Kotayk is the city of Yerevan with its district". At the turn of the 13th century, joint Armenian-Georgian troops, relying on the Armenian population's support, liberated the country's entire north from Seljuk invaders. Later, the Zakarid Armenia was established there under the Georgian Protectorate. In the first decades of the 13th century, Yerevan, along with other cities and towns and provinces of north-eastern Armenia, was under the rule of Ivane Zakaryan and his son, Avag. Yerevan, like other medieval cities, was under feudal ownership. The greater part of settlers were exploited by feudalists of either the secular or the religious class. There were also free craftsmen and free settlers who, however, were obliged to do certain work for the estate rulers and pay different duties.

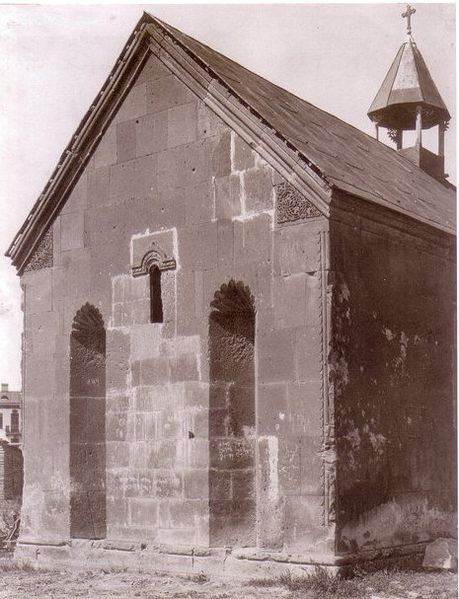
Gethsemane Chapel

There are also available records about the cultural life of medieval Yerevan. Hovhannes Kozern, an 11th-century scholar, is known to have been among the outstanding residents of the city for a certain period. He was buried in an ancient graveyard currently known as the Kozern Cemetery․ Terter Yerevantsi, a medieval Armenian poet, was born in Yerevan in the late 13th century.

Judging by the coins which have survived to our days, Yerevan was a leading center in the Aras Valley. It lay at a route connecting Barda with the city of Dvin. The earliest samples of the available coins melted in Yerevan trace their origins back to the Mongolian khanate of Ilkhanate. Here belong a 1333 golden coin which was owned by Abu Sa'id Bahadur Khan and a 1344 silver coin ascribed to Nushirvan Khan.

The late 14th century invasion of Tamerlan marked a period of a serious pause in the city's development. In 1387, Yerevan was ruined; the calamity claimed 500 human lives (Grigor Khlatetsi, Colophons of Disasters). According to Bakhikhanov, the same period saw Tamerlan populate the region with 50 families from the Qajar tribe "Emir Teymur" (Tamerlan), relocate 50,000 Qajar families in the Caucasus Krai (at the time, an administrative division of the Russian Empire) and resettle them in Yerevan, Ganja, Karabagh, where, in the course of time, they kept increasing in number. Many of those Qajars were statesmen under the Safavids and ruled Armenia and Shirvan". Later, under the rule of the Turkmen tribes Qara Qoyunlu and Aq Qoyunlu, Yerevan became an important cultural center under conditions of a political instability and an economic stagnation. It was in that period that the Qara Qoyunlu leader, Iskander, appointed a descendent of the Orbelian family the head of Yerevan with jurisdiction over the entire Ayrarat province. In the early 16th century, the city was conquered by Shah Ismail I from the Safavid dynasty, and several years later, it was consecutively conquered by the Ottoman Sultans Selim and Suleiman. Like the entire rest of Eastern Armenia, Yerevan for many decades remained an apple of discord between the Ottomans and the Persians.

== Modern age ==
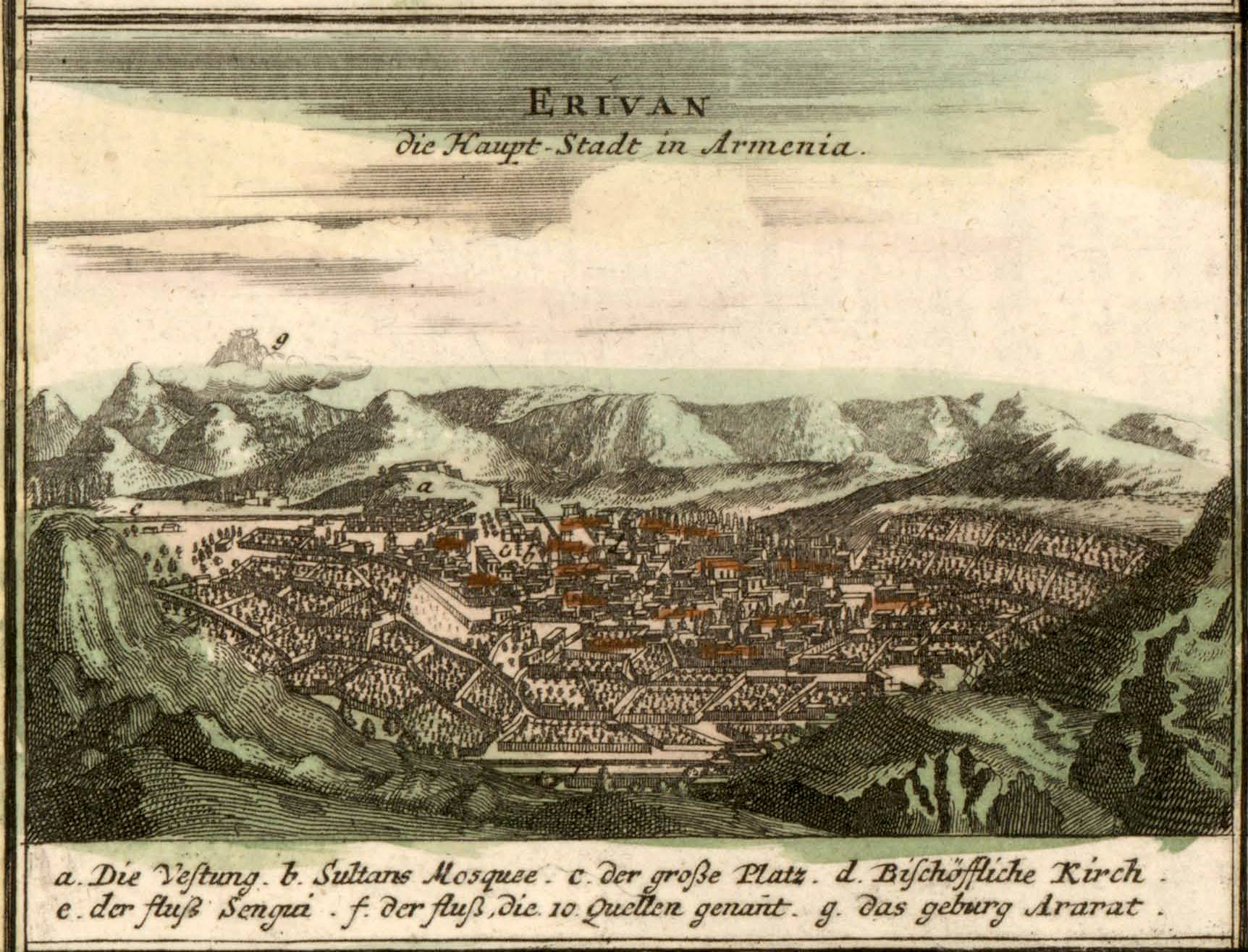
Painting of the engraver and cartographer I.B. Homann - "Erivan, the main city of Armenia"

After the Qara Qoyunlus proclaimed Yerevan the administrative center of Ararat province, travelers and historians often referred to it as a major regional city and the center of trade and handicraft of Eastern Armenia. From the 16th century onwards, Yerevan remained a key regional city, becoming the center of Persian rule of Eastern Armenia. The name Yerevan was featured also in the 16th century Ottoman-Safavid conflicts, when both sides battled for control over the entire Eastern Armenia. After the seizure of Kars and Nakhichevan in 1554, the Ottoman's conquered Yerevan, massacring a great number of residents and burning part of the city. Entrenching themselves in the late 1770s, they appointed their own governors there. The first Ottoman governor, Farhat Pasha, constructed a new big fortress between 1582 and 1583, making it a center of Ottoman defense against Safavid invasions. In the fight for control over Yerevan, the Persians and Turks periodically restored and completed the fortress. In 1604, it was conquered by Shah Abbas I. During the 1603-1618 Russian-Persian war, Abbas adhered to the "scorched-earth" tactics. The city and the nearest provinces were devastated, with the entire population being expelled into the depths of Persia. Historian Arakel Davrizhetsi provided a description of the Armenian population's mass deportation from Yerevan to Isfahan.

․․․ Shah Abbas did not pay any attention to the Armenians' entreaties. He called his Nakharars (ministers - translator's note) to himself and appointed some of them as overseers and middlemen for residents of the country so as every prince, accompanied by his troops, could dispossess and expel the population of one gavar. Amurghan Khan[45] was placed in charge of the [population] of Yerevan proper [Ararat Province] and several gavars nearby.

Shah Abbas' deportation, known as the "great sürgün", led to a dramatic decrease in the population of Eastern Armenia. Dariusz Kołodziejczyk writes: "Following the brilliant anti-Ottoman campaign of 1603-5, Shah ʿAbbās resumed control over the provinces of Yerevan and Nakhchivan, which constituted the core settlement of Eastern Armenians. As a result, the major centre of Armenian religious and cultural life, the Holy See of Etchmiadzin, again fell within the borders of the Safavid Empire. Yet, feeling that his grasp over the newly conquered territories was still insecure, ʿAbbās applied a scorched earth policy and undertook massive forced resettlements of the local population, especially Armenians, into central Iran" . Despite the wars, invasions and resettlements, the Armenians formed the majority of the population of Eastern Armenia up until the 17th century. According to Jan Jansen Strais, a 17-century historian, "Erivan was largely populated by poor Armenians". The lands of expelled Armenians were repopulated by Qizilbash Turks descending from the tribe of Qajars, and other groups.

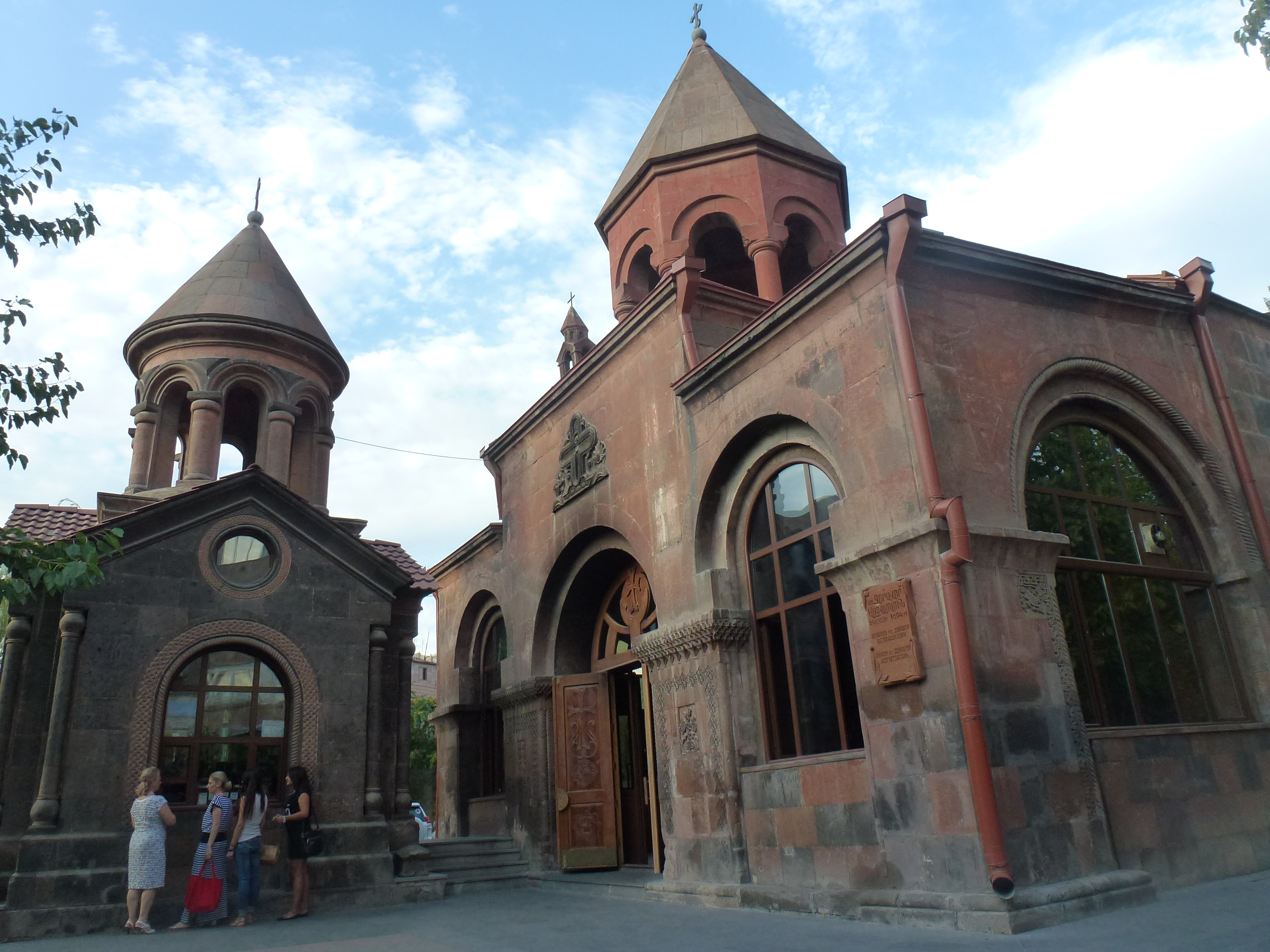
Zoravor Surp Astvatsatsin Church

In 1635, Yerevan was again a bone of contention. Finally, under the 1639 Peace Treaty of Zuhab, Eastern Armenia, including Yerevan, passed into the Persian zone for almost a century. After the 100-year Safavid rule, peace and prosperity returned to Yerevan. The city resumed its role of a major trade center on the caravan roads, as evidenced by recounts of western travelers.

Capitalizing on the fall of the Safavid state, the Ottomans re-conquered Yerevan in 1723. The latter established a garrison in the city and restored the fortress. For more than a decade they appointed their governors and levied taxes on the population. A contemporary historian, Abraham Yerevantsi provided a description of the Armenian population's resistance to the Ottomans. They ended up in a defeat by the troops led by Nadir Qoli Khan, the future Iranian shah, and starting 1723 onwards, Yerevan continued to remain part of Persia, serving as the center of the semi-independent Erivan Khanate starting from 1747. The latter was ruled by different Khans who, in the period of the mid-18th century Persian Revolt, were every now and then subjected to King Irakli II of Georgia or Panah-khan and Ibrahim-khan of Karabakh, both seeking to expand their influence on the Caucasus. Yerevan was later subjected to the official sovereigns of Eastern Armenia, Agha Mohammad Khan Qajar and his successor, Fath-Ali Shah.

A typical practice in the period of Persian domination was the appointment by shahs of different Khans as Beylerbeys, i.e. - governors of regions. That, in essence, led to the creation of the administrative center of Chokhur-e Sa'd or Erivan Khanate. The Khanate covered a total area of 12,000 square meters. It bordered on Georgia in the north, the Ganja and Karabakh Khanates in the east, the Nakhichevan Khanate and the Azerbaijan province in the south and the Ottoman Empire in the west. The Khanate was divided into fifteen administrative regions, i.e. - maghals. Armenians held a dominant position in different professions and in trade; they were of a great economic significance for the Persian administration. Dried fruit, salt, leather and copper were exported from Yerevan. Armenians from Yerevan also supplied wax, which was widely used in the royal palace. Of great significance was that Echmiadzin, the holy see of the Armenians, was close to the Khanate, as in the absence of an Armenian statehood, it served as both the spiritual and the political center of all the Armenians. Russian traveler Fedot Kotov writes: "Located not far from Yerevan is Uchklyus - as the Armenians call it - or Three Churches, as we the Russians, know the place. They were big and magnificent. The entire site and Yerevan were an Armenian kingdom ".

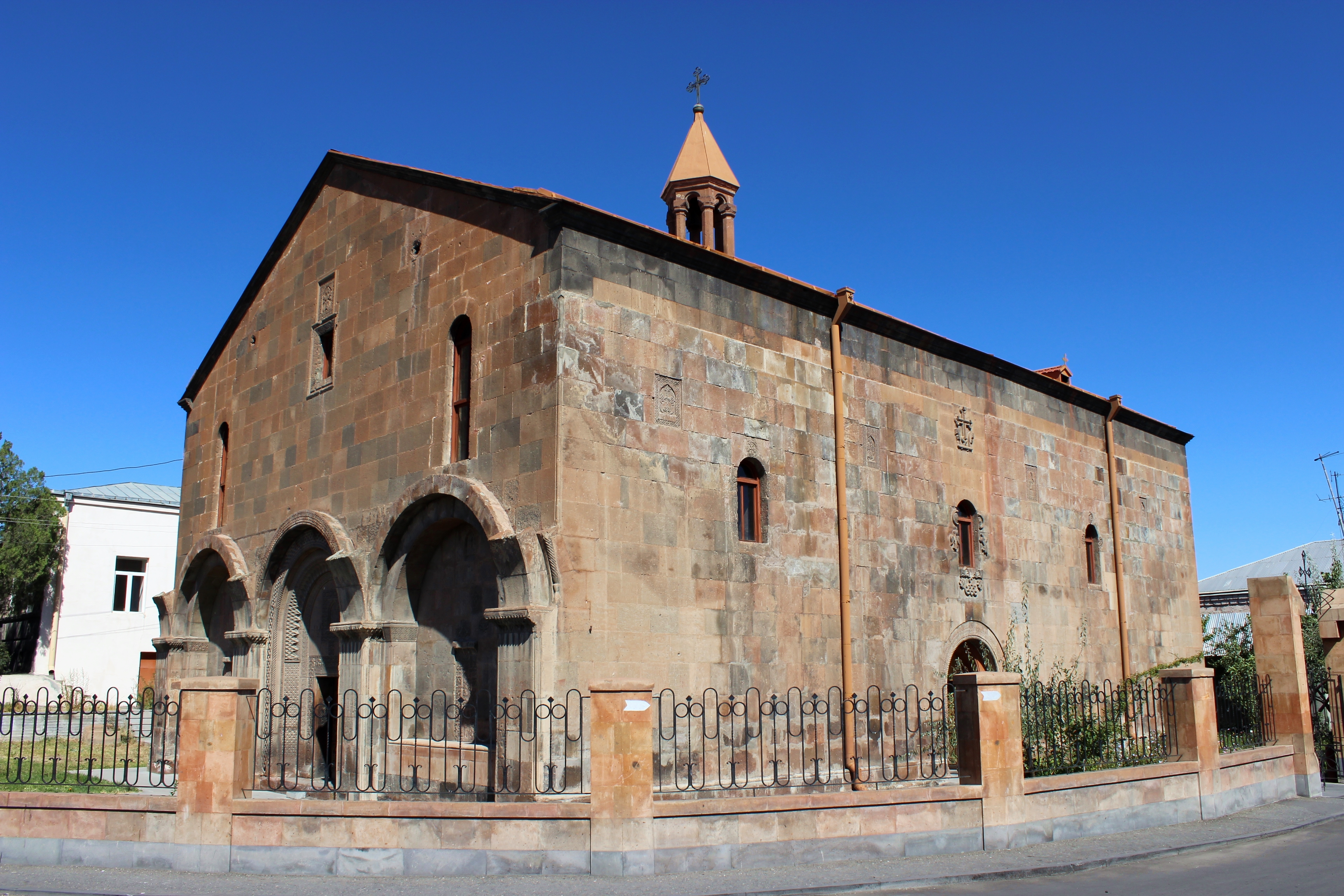
Saint Hakob Church of Kanaker

Despite the fact that the entire Khanate was ruled by the Khan (also known as sardar), the Armenian population was, from mid-18th century until 1828, under the direct jurisdiction of the Yerevan Melik descending from the Melik Aghamalyan family. The Melikdom of Yerevan traces its origins back to 1639, the year which practically marked the end of the Ottoman-Safavid war. It was, in all likelihood, part of the entire administrative reorganization of Persian Armenia after a lengthy period of wars and invasions. The family's first representative to hold the title of "Melik of Yerevan" was Melik Aghamal. The Meliks of Yerevan maintained a full administrative, legislative and judicial power over their people, their authority extending to the issuance of execution verdicts (which were subject to an approval by the sardar). In addition, the Melik also exercised military functions as either he or his appointee was in command of the military contingent in the sardar's army. All the other Meliks and village heads (tanuter) in the Khanate obeyed the Melik of Yerevan, and apart from the local villages within his control, all the Armenian villages in the Khanate were obliged to pay him annual taxes. The quarter Kond, where the Aghamalyans resided, was home to the ten ancient churches of the city.

Yerevan achieved considerable prosperity in the Qajar period. The city occupied a total area of 1.6 km2, with its outskirts and parks having been built on a territory of about 28.9km2. The urban and architectural model of Yerevan conformed to the general schemes and designs acceptable in the cities and towns of the Near East. The city was divided into four quarters or mahallahs: Shari, Tappa-Bashi and Demir-Bulag. It had 1,700 houses, 850 stores, 8-9 mosques, seven churches, 10 bathhouses, seven caravanserai, five squares, two markets and two schools. The main buildings which have survived from the past were the belfry of the XII century medieval Armenian cathedral, four small churches dating from the 18th century (the St. Zoravor, St. Hovhannes, St. Sarkis and St Peter and Paul churches), the 1664 bridge on the river Getar and the 1679 bridge on the river Hrazdan. The two biggest mosques of Yerevan were the Shir Mosque (erected in 1687) and the Blue Mosque (constructed in 1776, the final period of the Persian rule). The Khan's palace was located close to one of the mosques. The Blue Mosque was the biggest mosque of the city.

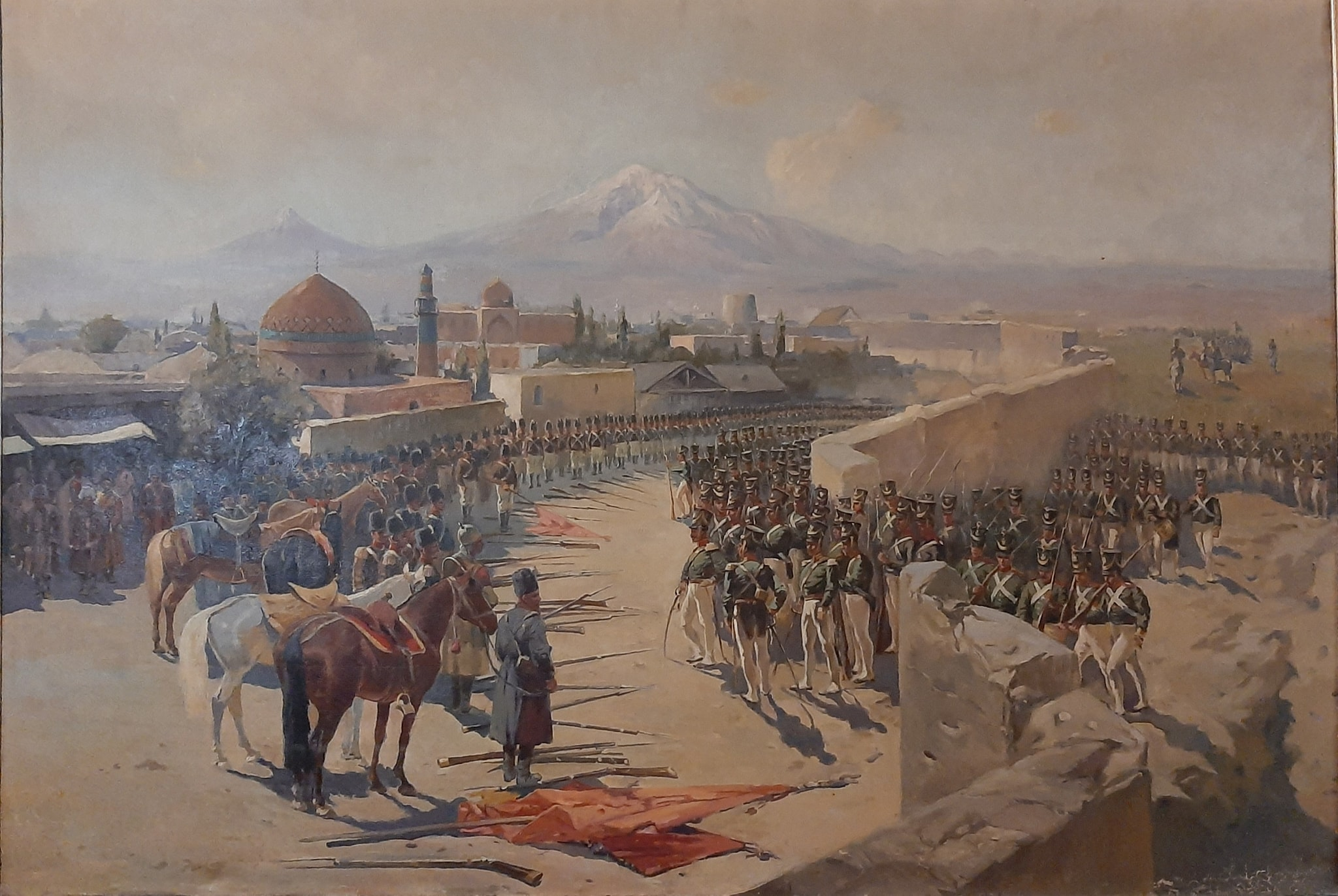
Capture of Erivan Fortress by Russia, 1827 (by Franz Roubaud, 1893)

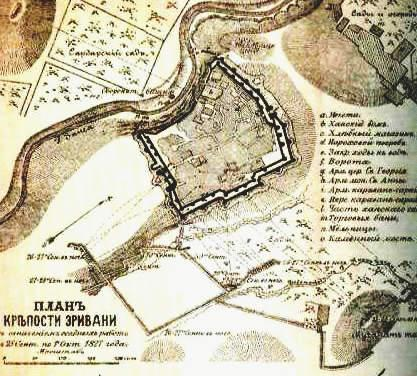
Site map of the Erivan Fortress drawn by V. Potto

Georgia's unification with Russia and the first Russian-Persian war (1804) again made Yerevan a strategic center of the Persian defense in the Caucasus. The city's big fortress, located on a high altitude and surrounded by massive walls and ammunition, resisted, for a certain period, the Russian incursion. In 1804, General Tsitsianov's incursion was repelled by the outnumbering Persian army led by Abbas-Mirza. In 1807, Russian troops, led by General Gudovich, launched another attack on the city. The fortress stood fast, and the Russians suffered a failure. Russia conquered the remaining part of the Caucasus as provided for in the 1813 Treaty of Gulistan. Later Erivan, together with Tabriz, became the base of operation of the Persian troops aspiring to return the lost territories. The second Russian-Persian war started in 1826, with the Erivani troops being part of the attacking Russian fortifications. Initially, the Persians had success, but the outnumbering Russian artillery troops led by General Paskevich eventually destroyed the fortresses of Sardarabad and Abasabad and the Erivan fortress (which was handed over to Russian on October 2, 1827). Persia requested peace, and in February 1828, the Treaty of Turkmenchay was signed, establishing a Russian control over Erivan and Nakhichevan. That in turn implied the end of the Khan's epoch. The new border passed across Aras river.

After the unification with Russia in 1828, the city was proclaimed the administrative center of the Armenian Oblast; it later served as the center of the Erivan Governorate formed on June 9, 1849. Under Russian domination, Yerevan in fact remained a single storey city of clay houses with flat roofs. The loss of Yerevan's commercial and strategic status precluded it from the economic development processes going on in several other cities across the Caucasus. Apart from the brandy factory, brick factory and several small manufacturing units, there were no industries in Yerevan in the pre-Soviet period. The city suffered severe losses in the First World War period. After the Bolshevik Revolution and the subsequent civil war in Russia, as well as the establishment of the Republic of Armenia in 1918 (with Erivan serving as its capital), the city became the center of all Armenian hopes for the coming two and a half years. After the fall of the Republic of Armenia and its Sovetization, Erivan (Yerevan from 1936 onwards) was the center of the new Soviet Armenia until 1936 (as part of the Transcaucasian Socialist Federative Soviet Republic). Yerevan was among the main technical, educational, scientific-research and industrial centers of the Caucasus. The city also became the center of Armenian national movements, as well as cultural and political rebirth in the Gorbachev era.

Due to the centuries-old wars, the population of Yerevan reduced to 6,000 in 1804. The period saw a large outflow of the population to Tiflis. A growth in the number residents was observed under the last Khan, and in 1827, the population surpassed 20,000. The Armenians held dominant positions in crafts and trade. The population of Erivan increased to as much as 30,000 between 1831 and 1913.

== Contemporary times ==
By 1926, an estimated 65,000 residents lived in Yerevan; by 1939, their number reached 205,000. Between 1939 and 1959, the population of Yerevan increased more than twofold, making up 518,000. In 1970, the city had 775,000 residents, whose number increased to 967,200 in 1990. The city's population saw a further rise by the end of the 20th century due to the immigration from the Spitak earthquake zone and the refugees from Azerbaijan.

== See also ==
- Timeline of Yerevan
- Erivan Khanate
