= Moscow Cinema =

Cinema in Yerevan, Armenia

Coordinates: 40.1054°N 44.3102°E

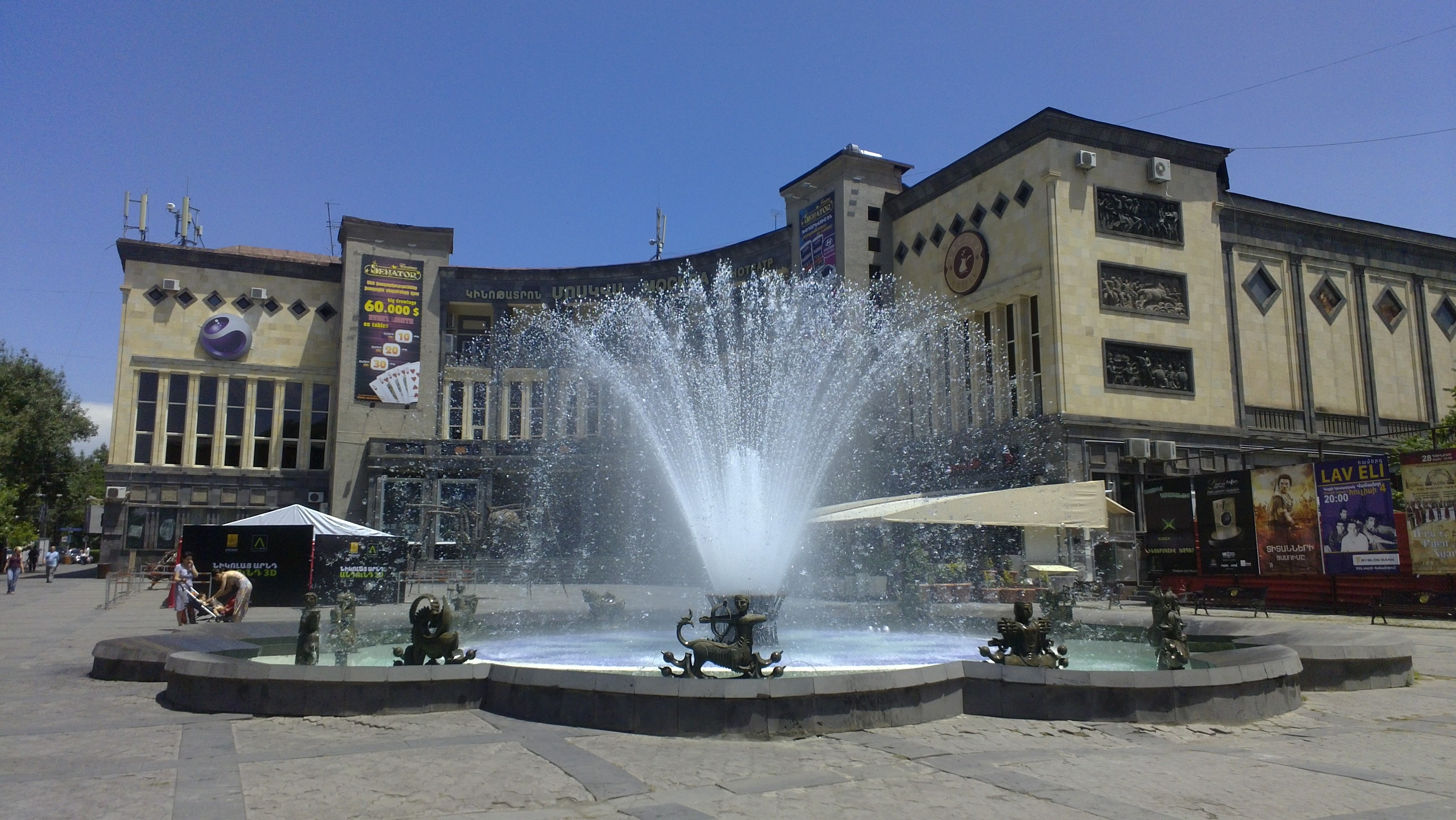
- Moscow Cinema
- Interactive map of Moscow Cinema
- Location: Abovyan Street; Yerevan, Armenia
- Seating type: Reserved
- Type: Indoor theatre

Construction
- Opened: 12 December 1936

Website
- official site

Moscow Cinema (Armenian: Մոսկվա կինոթատրոն, romanized: Moskva kinotatron) is a cinema hall in the Armenian capital Yerevan. It is located in Charles Aznavour Square on Abovyan Street.

== History and structure ==
The cinema was opened in 1936 on the site of Saint Paul and Peter Church, which was demolished in the 1930s by the Soviet authorities. The building was designed by architects Tiran Yerkanyan and Gevorg Kochar. The theatre was opened on 12 December 1936. Its first ever show was of the Soviet-Armenian movie Pepo.

In 1960, the building was redesigned by architects Gevorg Kochar and Telman Gevorkyan. In 1983, the building was redeveloped when the facade was decorated with scenes of many famous Soviet-Armenian movies including Chapayev, Pepo, David Bek and Sayat Nova.

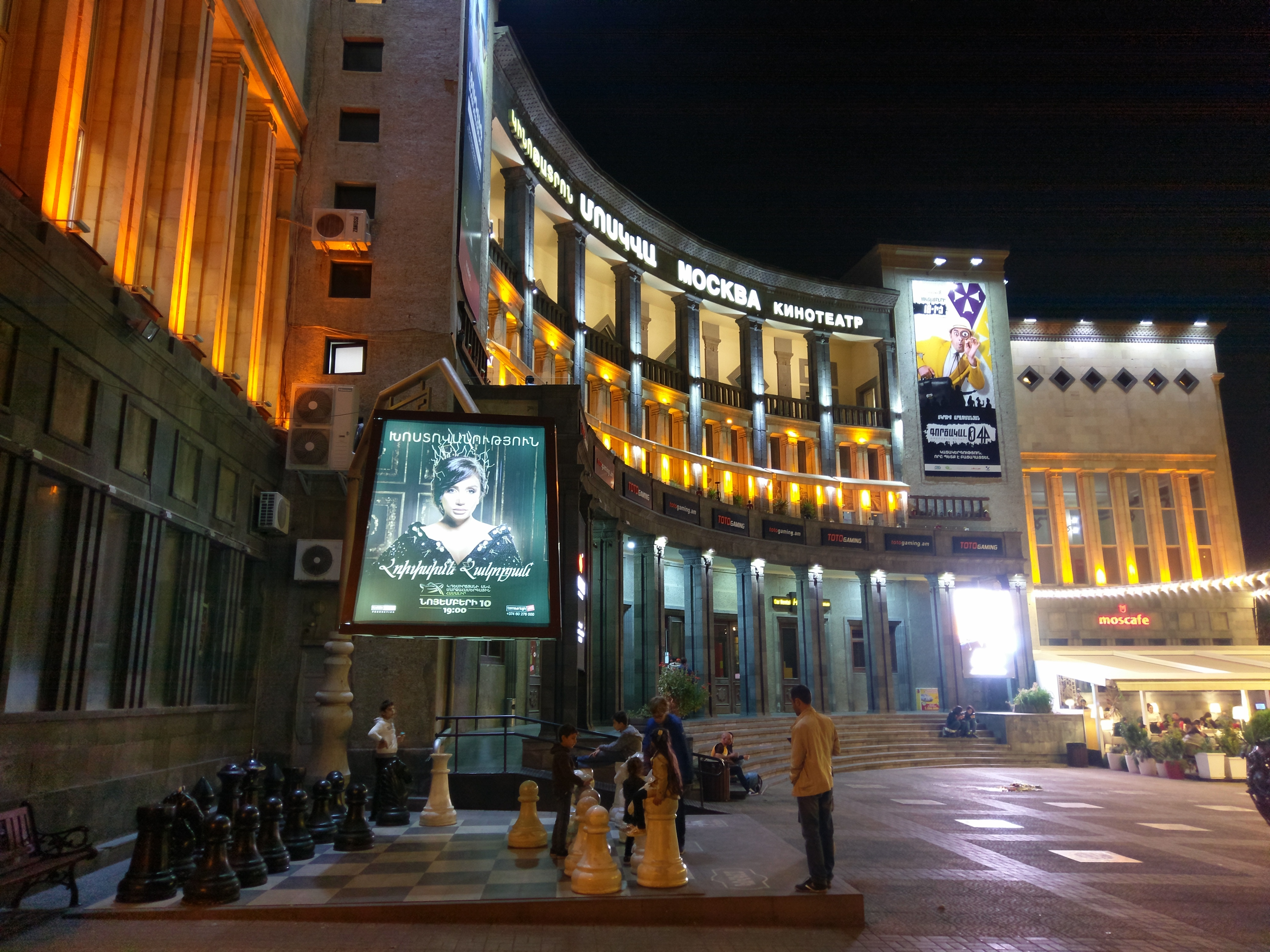
The cinema at night

The cinema was privatized in 1999. Following a major renovation, the cinema was reopened in September 2000.

Moscow Cinema is the main venue of the Golden Apricot Yerevan International Film Festival, an international film festival held in Yerevan every year since 2004. The square in front of the cinema was named after Charles Aznavour as part of the celebrations of the 10th anniversary of Armenian independence in 2001.

Currently, Moscow Cinema has 4 theatre halls: the red hall with 491 seats, the blue hall with 350 seats, the small red hall with 49 seats and the gallery with 35 seats. The cinema has also an open-air theatre located at the eastern side of the building.

== See also ==
- Armenian National Cinematheque
- Cinema of Armenia
