= List of mosques in Armenia =

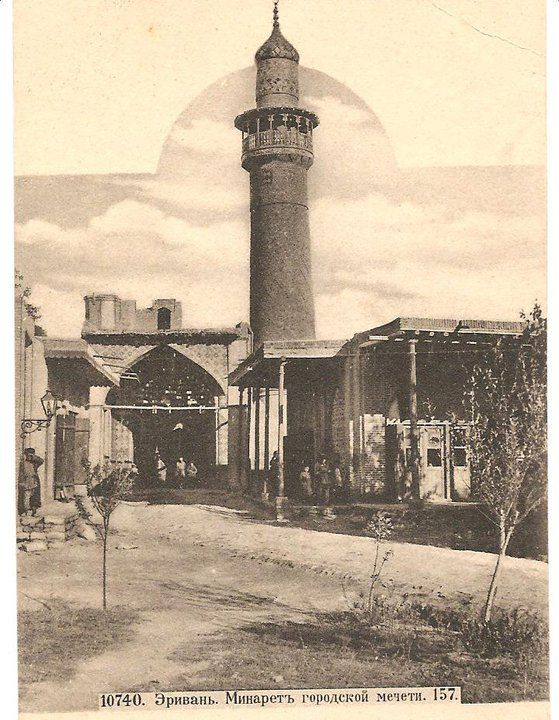
Minaret of a city mosque in Erivan

The following is a list of mosques found within the territory of modern Armenia.

== History ==
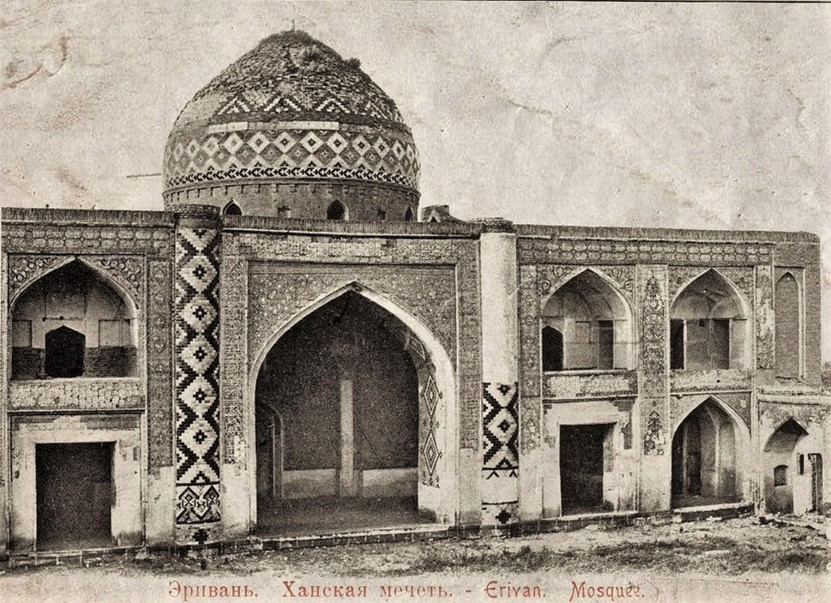
The 19th-century Abbas Mirza Mosque

According to the 1870 publication of the Caucasian Calendar, a statistical report published by the Russian Viceroyalty of the Caucasus, there were a total of 269 Shia mosques in Erivan Governorate, a territory which today which comprises most of central Armenia, the Iğdır Province of Turkey, and the Nakhichevan exclave of Azerbaijan.

=== In Yerevan ===
According to Brockhaus and Efron Encyclopedic Dictionary, by the turn of the twentieth century, the population of Erivan (modern Yerevan), center of the Erivan Governorate, was over 29,000; of this number 49% were "Aderbeydzhani Tatars" (modern Azerbaijanis), 48% were Armenians and 2% were Russians, and there were seven Shia mosques in Erivan. According to the traveler H. F. B. Lynch, the city of Erivan was about 50% Armenian and 50% Muslim in the early 1890s. H. F. B. Lynch thought that some among the Muslims were Persians when he visited the city within the same decade. According to modern historians George Bournoutian and Robert H. Hewsen, however, Lynch thought many were Persian.

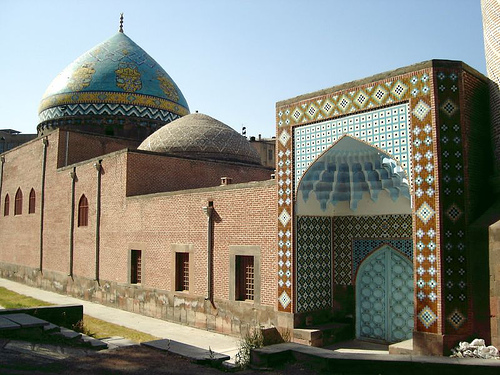
Blue Mosque, Yerevan

After the capture of Yerevan by Russians as a result of the Russo-Persian War, the main mosque in the city fortress, built by Turks in 1582, was converted to an Orthodox church under the orders of the Russian commander, General Ivan Paskevich. The church was sanctified on December 6, 1827, and named the Church of the Intercession of the Holy Mother of God.

According to Ivan Chopin, there were eight mosques in Yerevan in the middle of the nineteenth century:

- Abbas Mirza Mosque (in the fortress)
- Mohammad Khan Mosque (in the fortress)
- Zali Khan Mosque
- Shah Abbas Mosque
- Novruz Ali Beg Mosque
- Sartip Khan Mosque
- Blue Mosque
- Hajji Imam Vardi Mosque
- Hajji Jafar Beg Mosque (Hajji Nasrollah Beg)

After 1917, many of the city's religious buildings were demolished in accordance with the Soviet government's modernization and anti-religious policies. The campaign included the demolition of churches, mosques, and the Sheikh Mordechai Synagogue in the city, the city's only synagogue. According to the journalists Robert Cullen and Thomas de Waal, a few residents of Vardanants Street recall a small mosque being demolished in 1990. In 1988–1994 the overwhelming majority of the Muslim population, consisting of Azeris and Muslim Kurds, fled the country as a result of the First Nagorno-Karabakh War and the ongoing conflict between Armenia and Azerbaijan.

== Existing mosques ==
=== Aragatsotn Province ===
- Agarak Mosque

=== Lori Province ===
- Arjut Mosque – ruined mosque in the village of Arjut

=== Shirak Province ===
- Zorakert Mosque

=== Syunik Province ===
- Achanan Building - an old building from 695 AD in the village of Achanan with inscriptions from the Koran, signifying use as a holy place
- Aghitu Mosque
- Andokavan Mosque

=== Yerevan ===
- Blue Mosque⁣ – the only active mosque in Armenia today
- Mosques in the Kond quarter of Yerevan - the central square contains a "cluster of non-operating mosques dating back to the 17th and 18th centuries":
  - Abbasqoli Khan Mosque (also known as the Tepebashi, Thapha Bashi, or Kond Mosque) – a large, derelict 17th century mosque in the Kond quarter of Yerevan, the mosque was used to house 17 refugee families after the Armenian genocide. Today, 4 families use the mosque as makeshift housing. The dome of the mosque collapsed after the 1988 Armenian earthquake and is in a crumbling state today. In 2022, plans were announced in cooperation between Iranian authorities and the Yerevan municipality to renovate the mosque.
  - Small mosque of Kond - a small mosque in ruins in the Kond quarter of Yerevan.

== See also ==
- Islam in Armenia
