= Pana-Khan Palace =

19th-century palace in Yerevan, Armenia

- Armenian: Փանախանի տունը
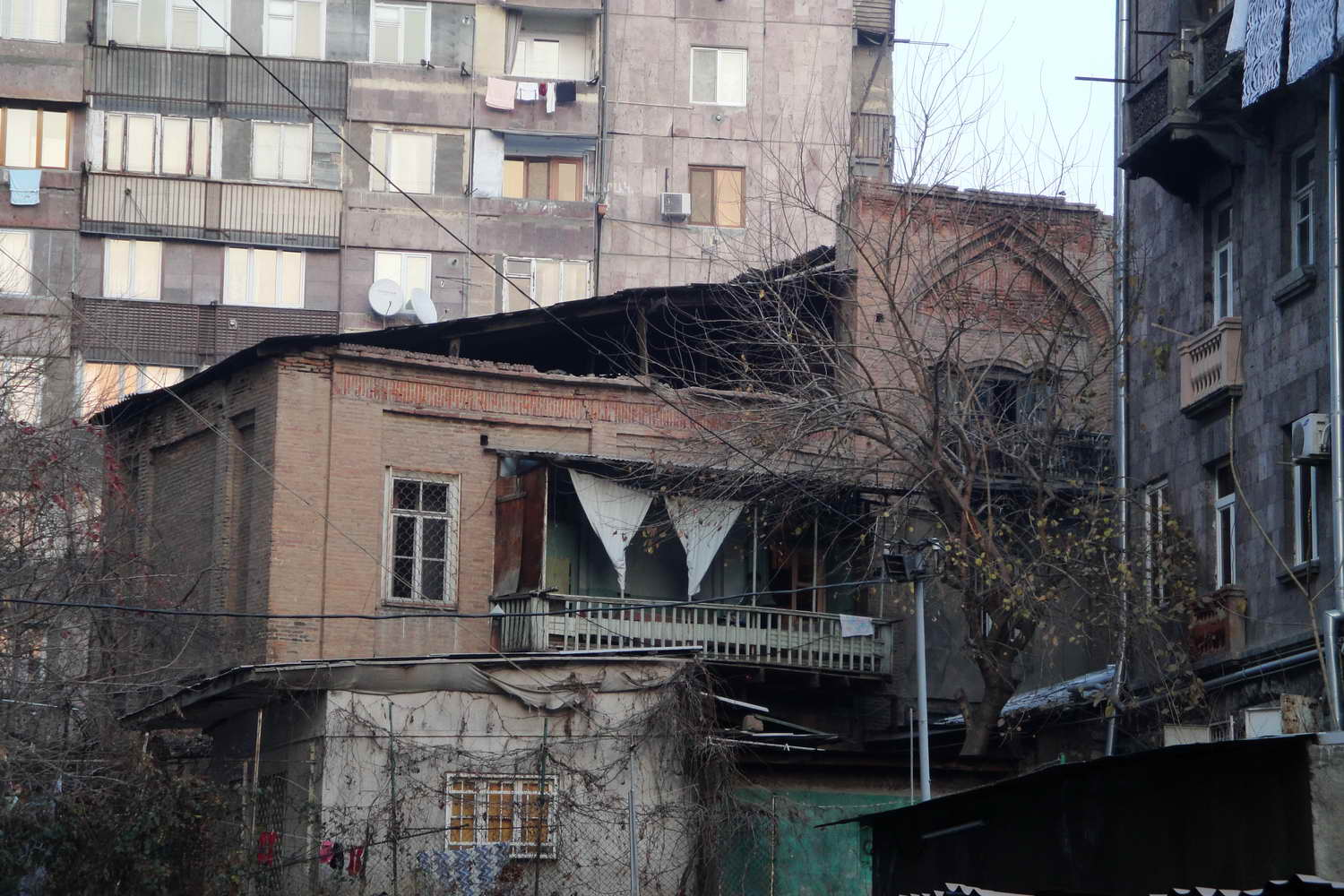
- The palace in 2010
- Interactive map of the Pana-Khan Palace area

General information
- Type: Palace
- Architectural style: Persian
- Location: Vardanants Deadlock, Vardanants Street, Yerevan, Armenia
- Coordinates: 40°10′45″N 44°31′10″E
- Completed: 19th century

The Pana-Khan Palace (Armenian: Փանախանի տունը, romanized: Panakhani tuny) is a 19th-century palace-type complex located in central Yerevan, Armenia. Built during the period of Iranian Armenia, the palace is located near Sakharov Square (formerly Pana-Khan Square), on the second lane of Vardanants Street. Since the end of the Persian rule in Yerevan in 1828, it now serves as a private residential complex.

== History ==
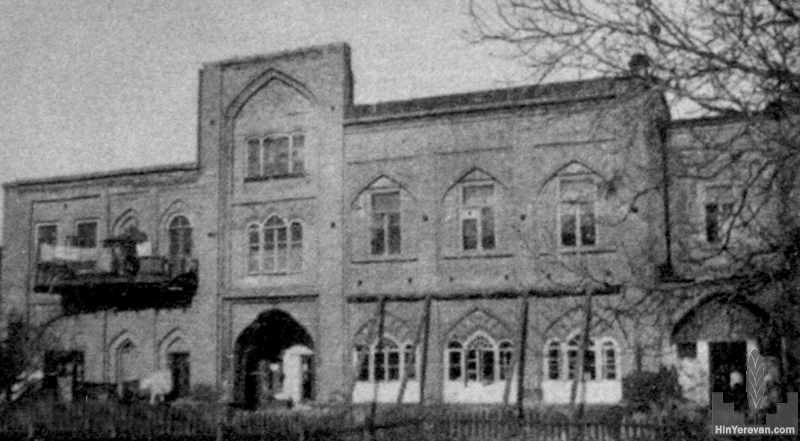
The Pana-Khan palace in 1912

The palace was built in the early 19th century when Armenia was under Iranian suzerainty however, the exact origin of the structure is unclear. It formed part of the historic Shahar district of Yerevan, the central and oldest part of the city. Certain sources state that the palace served as a residence for the Persian Pana-Khan, who was a local khan of the region. Other sources state that it was originally a madrasa that was part of a larger complex dedicated to Muhammed Sardip Khan, the high-ranking commander of the last sardar of Yerevan, Hossein Qoli Khan, which also included a mosque and a small minaret that were destroyed during construction works in 1958.

The Sakharov Square, near where the palace is located, was called the Pana-Khan square from when the city was under Persian rule. The local Armenian family that currently lives in the former kitchen of the complex attests that their great-great-grandfather was a cook for the Khan who owned the palace and that after the Russian conquest of the region, he gifted the palace to their family. The palace currently serves as a residential complex for the local Armenians, as well as, Armenian refugees from Syria and workers from Russia. It is the subject of the 1947 painting by Armenian artist Ararat Gharibyan titled Old Yerevan: The House of Panakhan (Հին Երևան. Փանախանի տունը) housed in the National Gallery of Armenia.

== Description ==
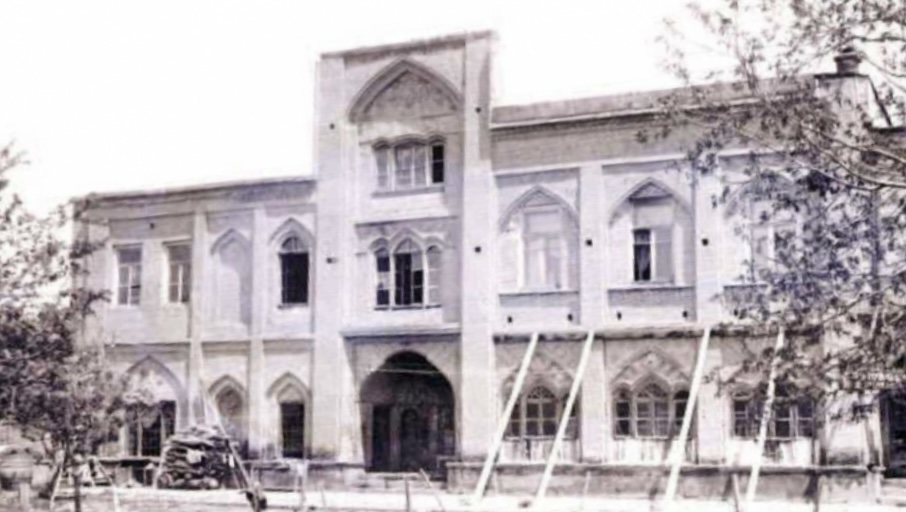
Facade of the palace in 1921

The walls of the palace are 60 centimeters wide and are made of brick. The architectural style follows the typical trend of Iranian two-story brick houses of the time period, showing similarities to the houses of Sanandaj in the Kurdistan region of Iran. The palace is mostly two stories except for the center which is 3 stories, following Iranian tradition of having an upper floor reserved exclusively for women. The exterior facade is characteristic of Iranian architecture, containing colorful decorative brickwork in the colors turquoise, green, red, and yellow. Parts of the building have been preserved in their original form, such as the left room in the first floor, the third floor, and the historic balcony, while others have been entirely repurposed such as the entire second floor and the right side of the first floor. Wood was also used as a main structural component of the building. The style of interior decoration, facade, and brickwork are typical of houses from the Qajar era.

== See also ==
- House of Panah Khan Makinski in Yerevan

== Bibliography ==
- Avagyan, Eduard [in Armenian] (2004). Երեւանյան խճանկար [Yerevan mosaic]. Armenia: Zangak-97. p. 53. ISBN 9789993028086.
- Gevorgyan, Lianna (2020). "Երևանը լուսանկարչական արվեստում" [Yerevan in photographic art]. Armenia: Yerevan History Museum.
- Gizhlaryan, Lilit (2018). "The Muslim Heritage of Yerevan: Not Just Another Brick in the Wall". The Caucasus Edition: Journal of Conflict Transformation. Washington, D.C.: Imagine Center for Conflict Transformation. ISSN 2155-5478.
- Mirijanyan, Dianna; Harutyunyan, Arsen; Davtyan, Davit; Grigoryan, Avetis; Babajanyan, Astghik (2023). "The Peculiarities of Urban Planning in Yerevan In the Period of Iranian Domination". “Orbeli” analytical-research center. Yerevan: Institute of Archaeology and Ethnography of NAS RA.
- Ordoukhanian, Evlin (2015). "Architectural and Stylistic Particularities of 19th Century Yerevan Brick Residential House (With Panakhan House Sample)". Bulletin of National University of Architecture and Construction of Armenia (3): 41–45. ISSN 1829-4197.
