= Abbas Mirza Mosque, Yerevan =

Destroyed mosque in Armenia

Abbas Mirza Mosque
- Armenian: Աբաս Միրզայի մզկիթ; Persian: مسجد عباس میرزا
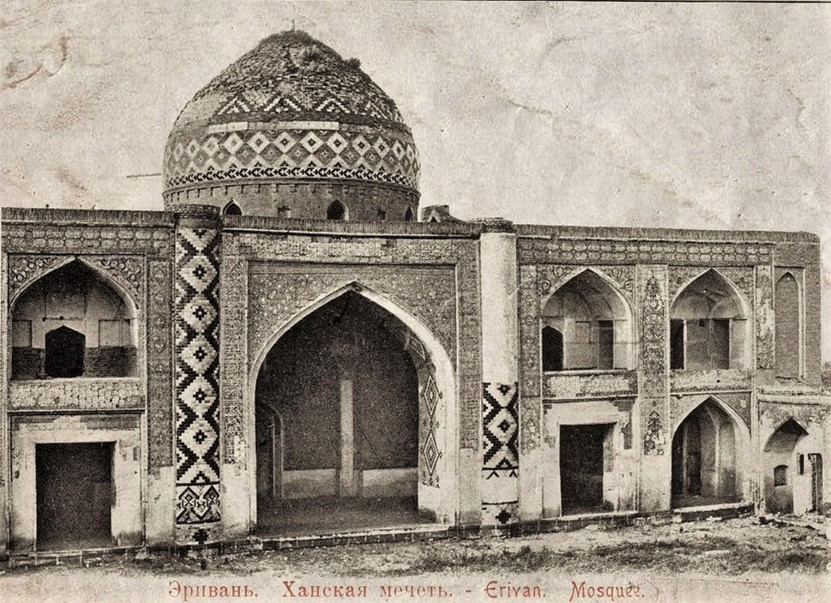
- Illustration of the former mosque, in 1917

- Location of the destroyed mosque in modern-day Armenia

Religion
- Affiliation: Twelver Shia Islam (former)
- Ecclesiastical or organizational status: Mosque (1817–1828); Profane use (1828–1988)
- Status: Abandoned; and destroyed

Location
- Location: Yerevan
- Country: Armenia
- Interactive map of Abbas Mirza Mosque
- Coordinates: 40°10′19″N 44°30′13″E

Architecture
- Type: Mosque architecture
- Style: Islamic (1817); Iranian (1817)
- Completed: 17th century (1st mosque); c. 1817 (2nd mosque)
- Destroyed: 1988

The Abbas Mirza Mosque (Armenian: Աբաս Միրզայի մզկիթ, romanized: Abas Mirzayi mzkit; Persian: مسجد عباس میرزا) was a seventeenth-century Twelver Shia Islam mosque, that was located in what is modern-day Yerevan, Armenia.

Prior to the mosque's construction, a 17th-century mosque existed on the same site. Rebuilt in c. 1817 in the period of Qajar Iran, due to the neglect of first the Tsarist and then the Soviet authorities, the mosque gradually fell into disrepair, constant looting disfigured the interior and façade, and the remains of the mosque were finally demolished in the late 1980s.

== History ==
=== First mosque ===
The Shah Abbas Mosque, also known as Sardar Mosque, (Note: Derived from the Palace of Sardar.) was a 17th-century mosque built in Erivan, during the rule of the Iranian Safavid shah, Abbas the Great. The Shah Abbas Mosque in Ganja, was built at the same time.

Along with the Rajab-Pasha Mosque, a Sunni mosque, the Shia Shah Abbas Mosque was one of the two major mosques built inside the walls of the Erivan Fortress. The demise of this mosque is not known.

=== Second mosque ===
Between 1807 and 1817, the mosque was rebuilt during the reign of the last khan (governor) of the Erivan Khanate, Huseyn Khan. It was named Abbas Mirza Jami, after the Qajar crown prince Abbas Mirza, the son of Fat′h-Ali Shah Qajar. Abbas Mizra was aged approximately 20 years at the time of the mosque's construction, believed to be c. 1810. The mosque was also built within the Erivan Fortress grounds.

The façade of mosque was covered in green and blue glass, reflecting Persian architectural styles.

After the Capture of Erivan by the Russians and their victory in the Russo-Persian War, the mosque was used as an arsenal, and barracks. H. F. B. Lynch described what he saw of the former mosque in his 1901 book:

From this kiosque we may make our way to the adjoining mosque of the fortress, which is now no longer frequented by the faithful. It stands a little east of the old palace; the interior beneath the spacious dome is decorated with much skill by means of little bricks of many colours. The great court is already ruinous. An old henna-stained attendant informed us that it was erected in the reign of Fath Ali Shah and that it was known as the Abbas Mirza Jami. Walls and palace and mosque are, I conclude, already doomed.

— H. F. B. Lynch, 1901.

During the Soviet era, the mosque, along with Christian buildings, was derelict. The only preserved item of the former mosque is the frame of the building.

== Gallery ==
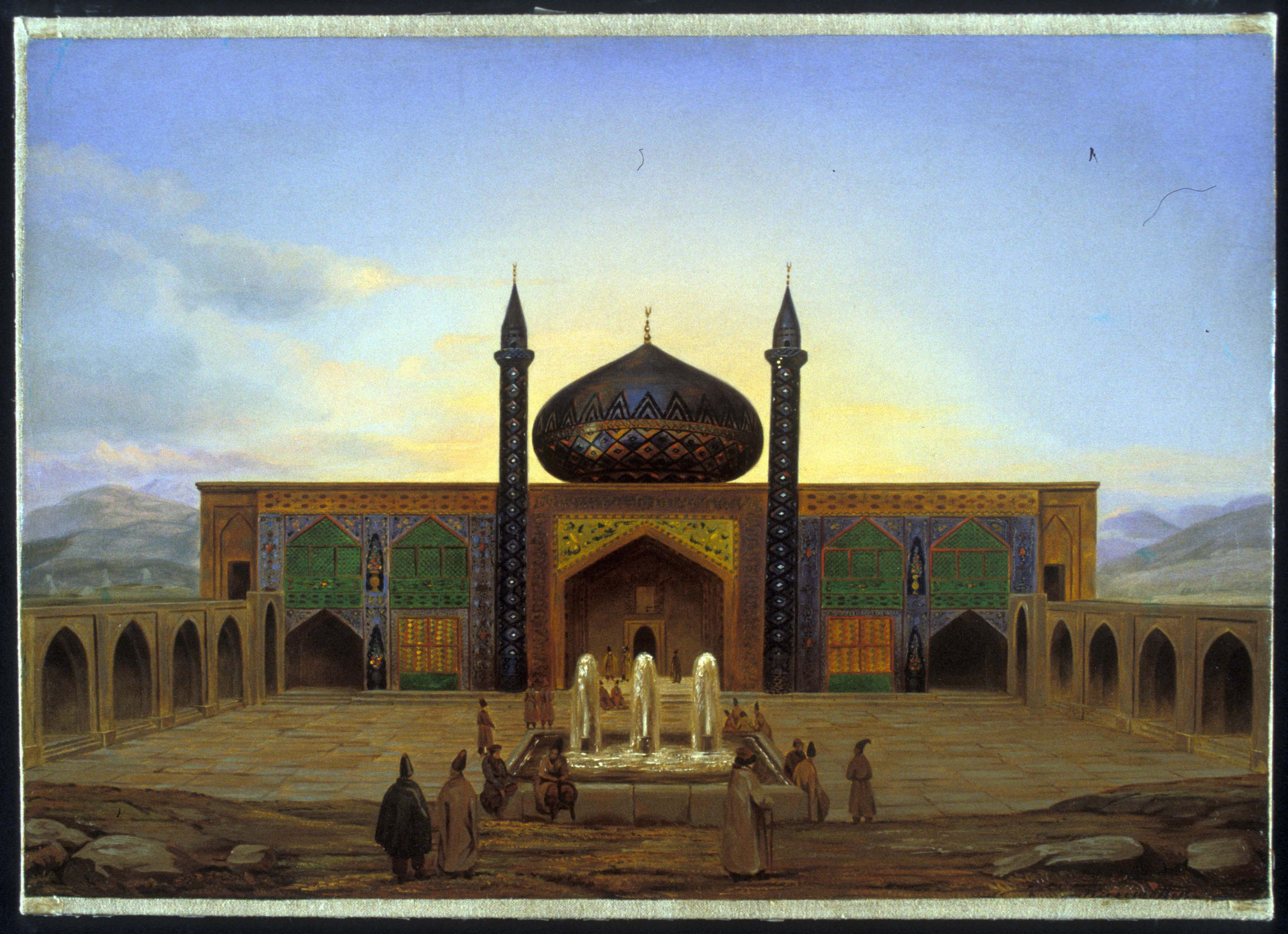
Moschee zu Eriwan by August Wilhelm Kiesewetter (between 1848 and 1849)

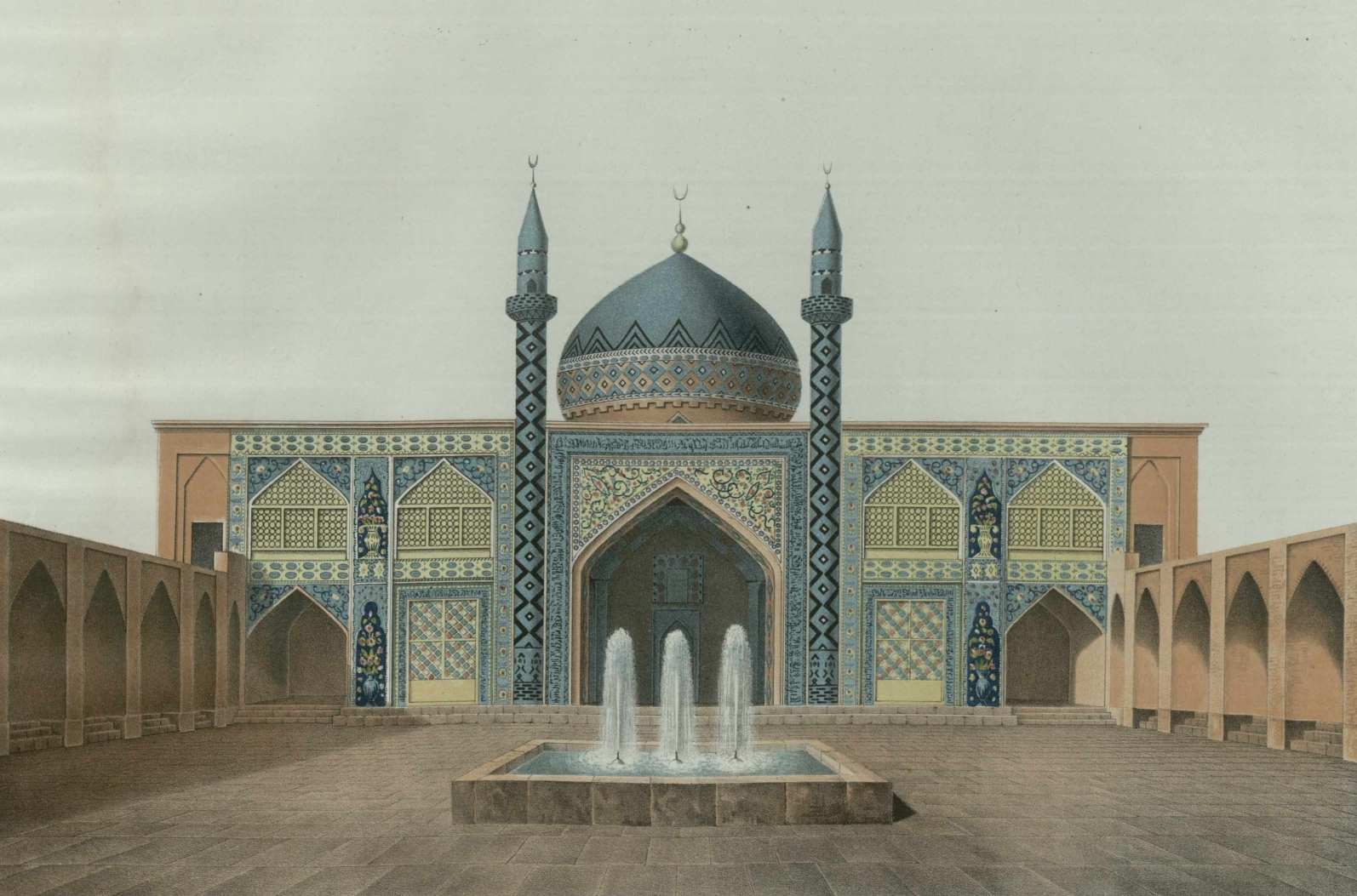
Mosquée de la Forteresse Erivan by Frédéric Dubois de Montpéreux (d. 1843)

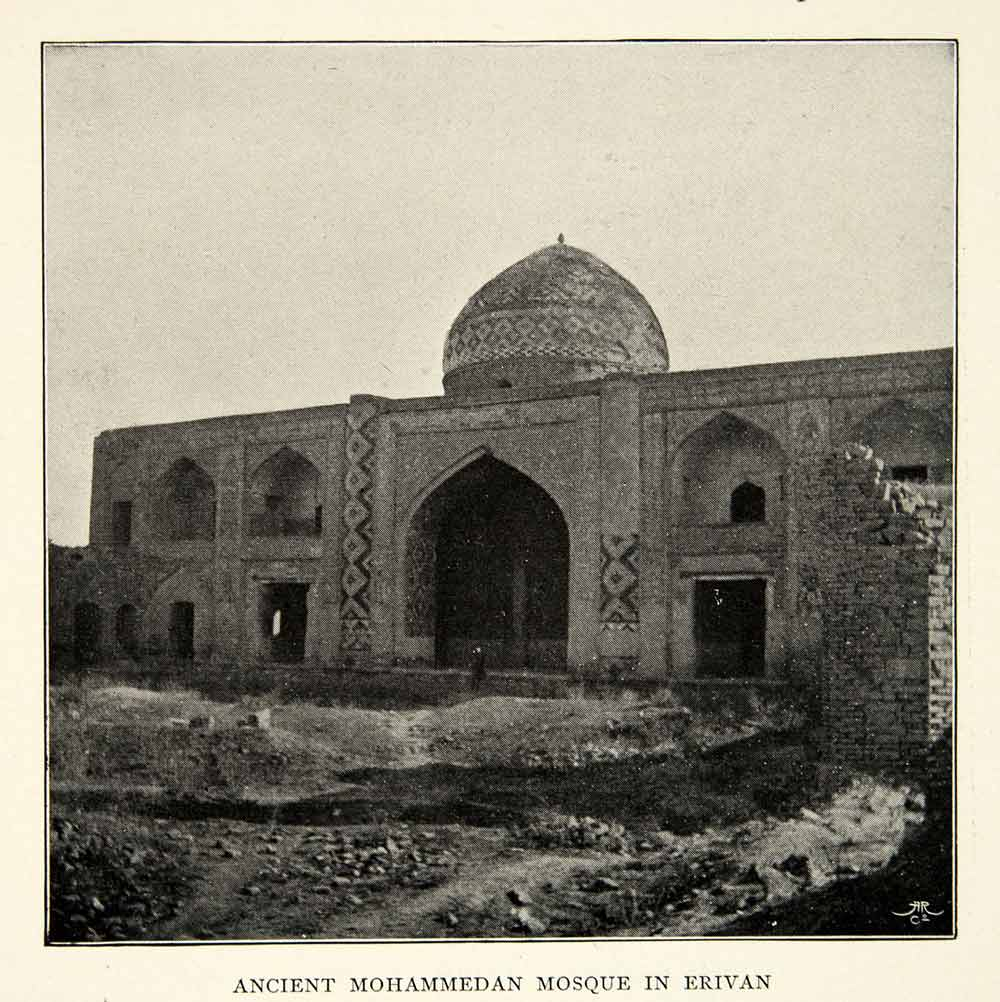
The mosque in 1899

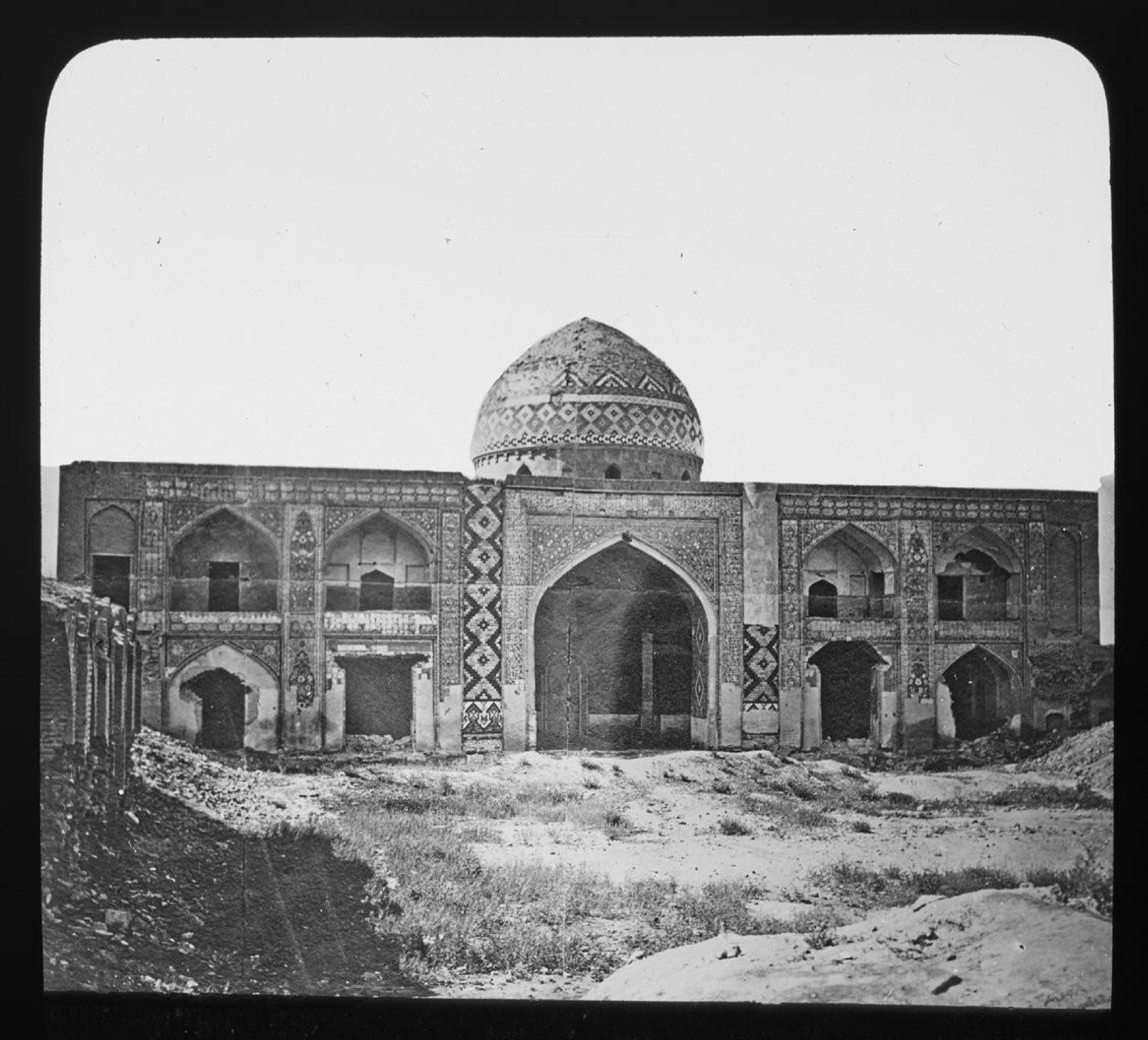
The mosque in late 19th century

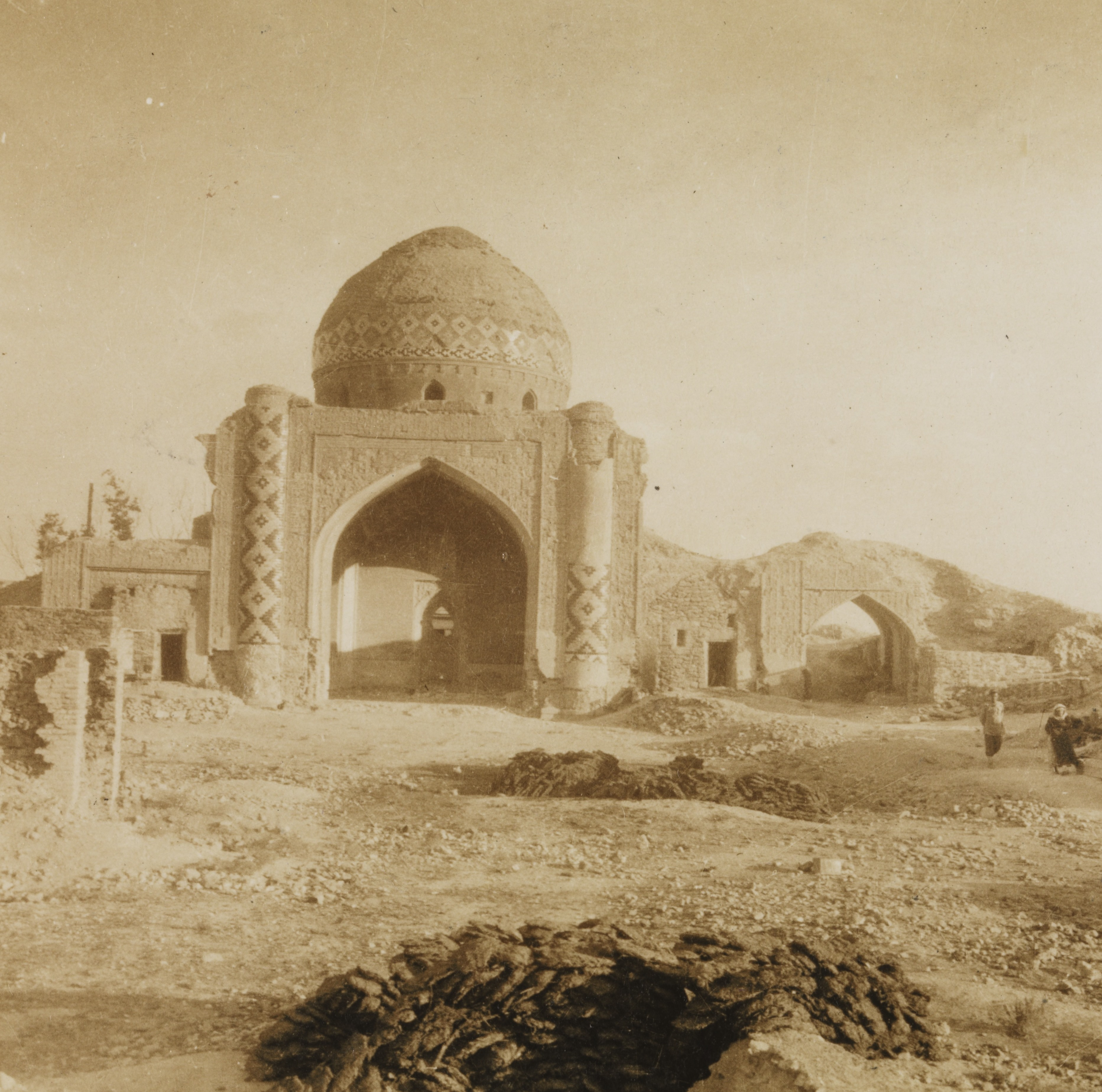
Remains of mosque in 1925 (photo by Fridtjof Nansen)

== See also ==
- Islam in Armenia
- List of mosques in Armenia
- Iranian Armenia (1502-1828)
