= Zalkhan Mosque =

Destroyed mosque in Armenia

- Armenian: Զալխանի մզկիթ
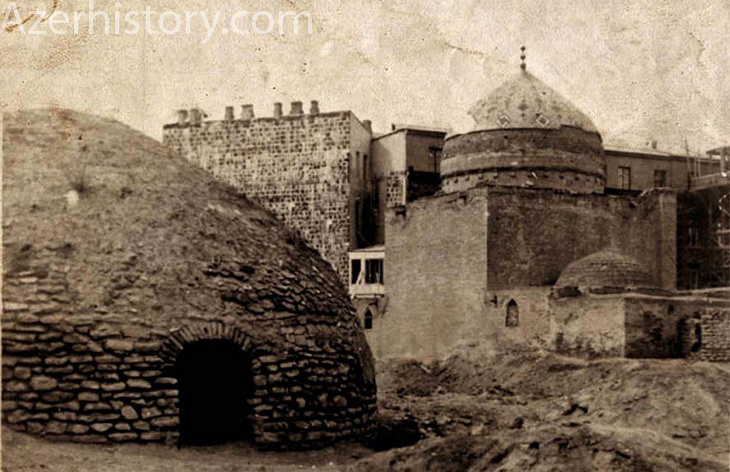
- An illustration of the former mosque, c. 1925

- Location of the destroyed mosque in modern-day Armenia

Religion
- Affiliation: Shia (Twelver) (former)
- Ecclesiastical or organizational status: Mosque (1687–1926)
- Status: Destroyed

Location
- Location: 14-16 Abovyan Street, Yerevan
- Country: Armenia
- Interactive map of Zalkhan Mosque
- Coordinates: 40°10′52″N 44°31′01″E

Architecture
- Type: Mosque architecture
- Style: Islamic
- Completed: 1098 AH (1686/1687 CE)
- Demolished: 1926
- Dome: One

The Zalkhan Mosque (Armenian: Զալխանի մզկիթ), also sometimes called Zal khan Mosque or Sheher Mosque, was a Twelver Shia mosque, located in the Shahar quarter of Yerevan, in what is modern-day Armenia. The mosque was built in c. 1687 in what was then Iran, and is believed to have been demolished in 1926.

== History ==
The mosque was between the Gala and Tepebashi massifs of Yerevan. It is believed to have been built between 1649 and 1685. According to H. F. B. Lynch, it was written on the mosque in Turkish and Arabic letters that it was built in 1098 AH (1686/1687 CE).

In 1926 the great hall of the mosque was demolished and a state-owned hotel of the Armenian SSR, the first hotel in Soviet Armenia, was built in its place. It was called the Intourist Hotel, after the Intourist agency; the name was changed in 1959 to the Yerevan Hotel. Following a 1999 reconstruction it was named the Golden Tulip Hotel Yerevan, located at 14 Abovyan Street.

An archival document from 1949, kept in the State Archives of the Republic of Azerbaijan, states that the Zalkhan Mosque was used as an exhibition hall.

The purpose of the madrasa of the Zalkhan Mosque, which has a two-story building and many cells, changed after the Second World War. As of 2018, the exhibition hall of the House of Artists was located in that building, at 16 Abovyan Street.

== See also ==
- Islam in Armenia
- List of mosques in Armenia
- Iranian Armenia (1502–1828)
