= Palace of Sardar =

Residence of the ruler of Erivan Khanate

- Erivan, Erivan Khanate (now part of Armenia)
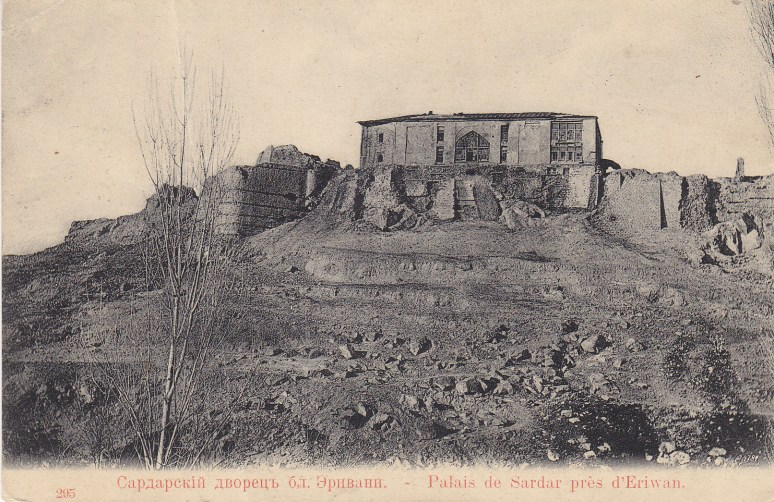
- Sardar Palace on a postcard since the times of the Russian Empire

Site information
- Condition: Demolished

Site history
- Built: XVI-XVII
- In use: Erivan khanate (until 1827); Armenian Oblast Governor's(1828–40) Erivan Governorate's Governor (1850–64)
- Demolished: 1914-1918

Palace of Sardar or Sardar Palace (Armenian: Երեւանի սարդարի պալատ, Persian: کاخ سردار) is the former residence of Sardar, the ruler of the Erivan Khanate. It was located in the northeastern part of the Erivan Fortress in Yerevan, on the left bank of the Hrazdan river.

During the Russian-Persian War of 1827, the fortress was destroyed, and the palace itself was in ruins, with the exception of the personal pavilion of the Sardar. During 1914–1918, the remains of the ruined palace were also destroyed. Later, on the site of the palace, according to the project of R. Israelian, the building of the “Ararat” winery rose.

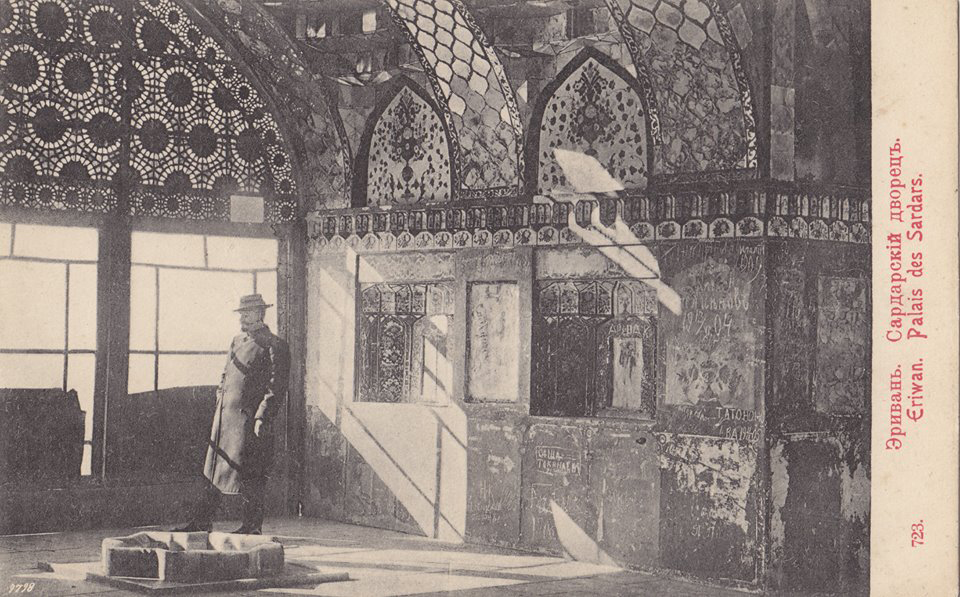
The Sardar Palace on a postcard of the imperial years. The view of the marble platform with a fountain and an openwork window.

== Legends ==
According to a popular legend recorded at the beginning of the 20th century, the Sardar Palace was built around 1600 by the Safavid hero Arus, his sons Zorab and Faramos, and his daughter, the evil sorceress, Luthera.

== Palace’s interior ==
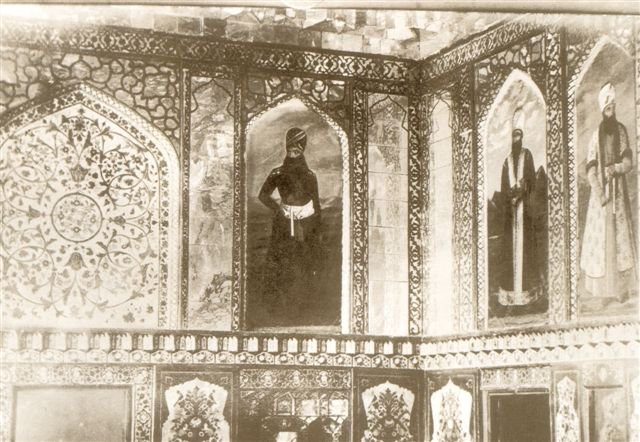
Portraits in the Palace's Hall of Mirrors

The facade of the Mirror Hall of the palace was facing the Zange river (nowadays - Hrazdan). The walls of the hall were flush with the high steep wall above the river bank. To the left and to the right, the embankments rose from the crumbling clay walls of the Erivan fortress.

All the walls of the palace were covered with tiles with patterns and flowers. The walls between the tiles were covered with rough painting. In addition to the flowers, peacocks, lions and the sun were depicted there. The floor was glazed brick. The ceiling was covered with mirrors. There were also mirrors in the recesses along the walls and between the portraits.

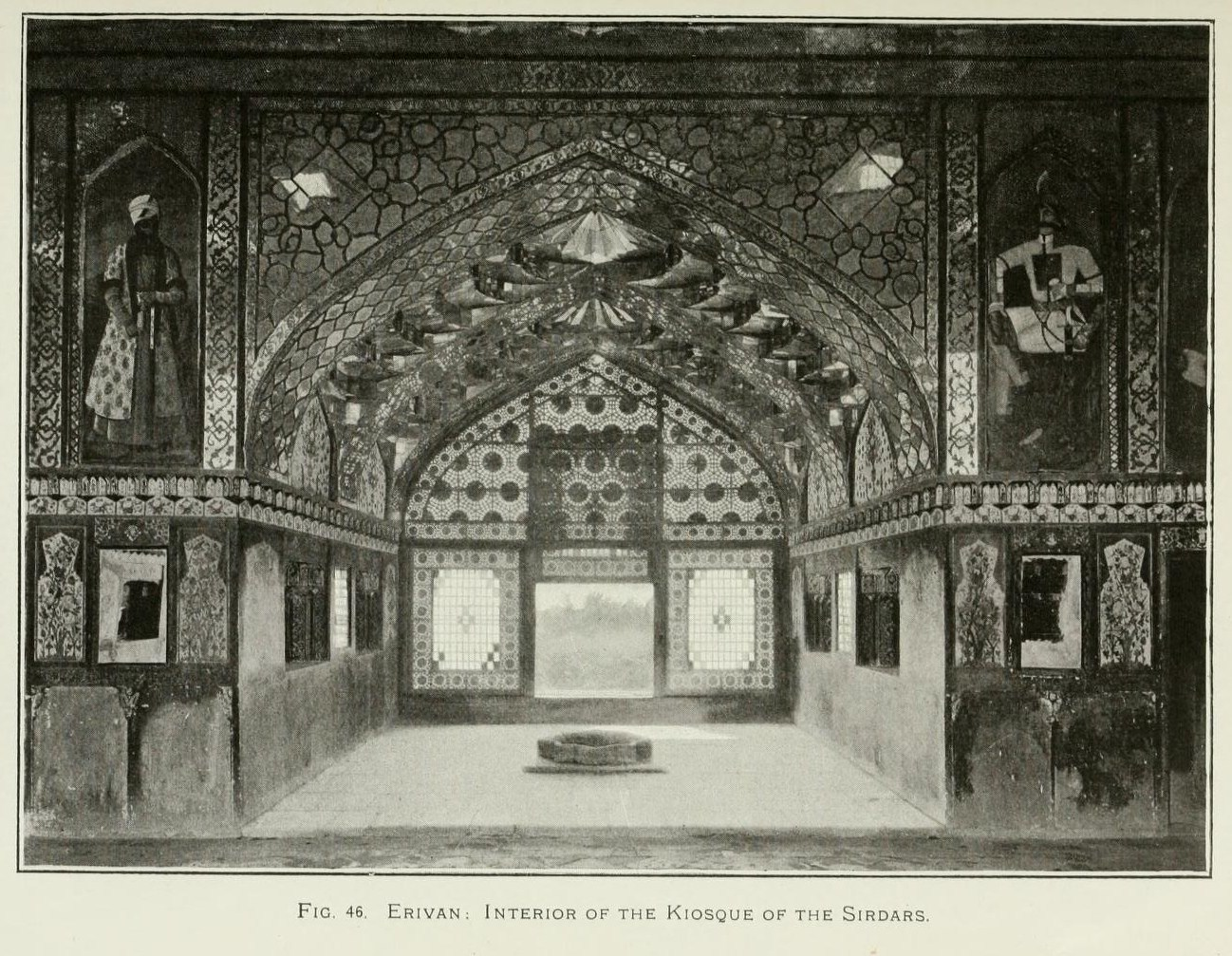
The interiors of the palace during the early 20th century

According to literary data, it is known that the Sardar Palace's walls of the Mirrored Hall were richly decorated with ornamental and thematic compositions. Scene murals were placed between the cornice and the ceiling of the palace, showing the legendary exploits of Rustam. On the first, Rustam hits a young warrior with a dagger, on the second he tears his clothes, learning that he has killed his son Zohrab; on the third – he pulls the enemy off the horse; on the fourth – he wins the diva and breaks his horns. According to the description of the eyewitnesses, in the palace, there was also depicted "a comic picture of an old man being kind to a young girl who serves him a glass of wine".

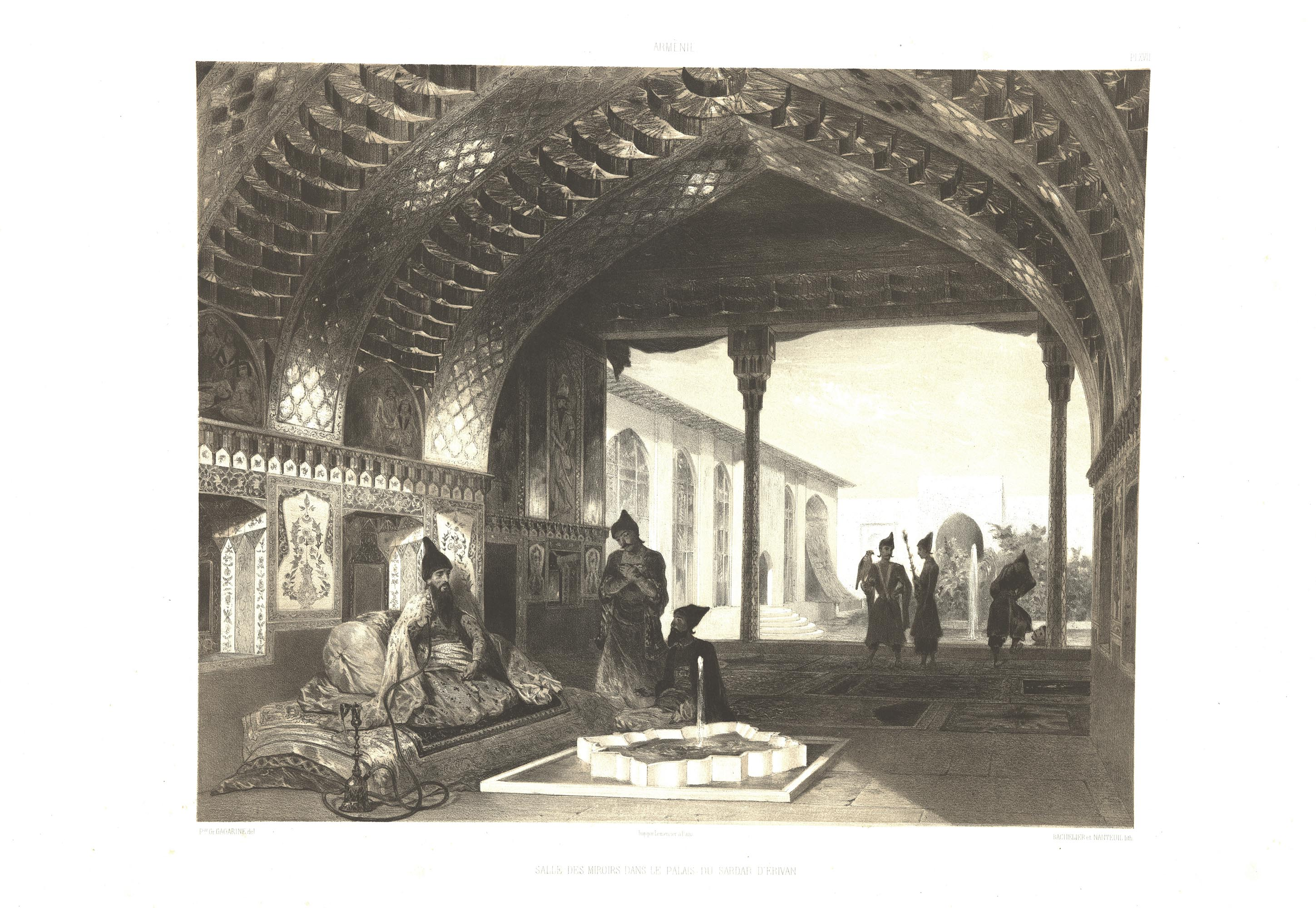
Mirror Hall of the palace on G. Gagarin's drawing

In the 1850s, the Azerbaijani artist Mirza Kadym Erivani painted 4 large (1x2 m) oil portraits for the restored palace. In essence, these portraits made on canvas with oil paints were the first easel works in the Azerbaijani painting. The portraits were placed in the second niches' tier of the palace's large hall. With the complete destruction of the palace in 1914, these portraits were removed from the walls and can be currently found in the State Museum of Georgia. From the relatives' memoirs, it is known that in Mirza Kadim's room there were four more similar portraits depicting armed soldiers (it is assumed that these were the artist's versions of portraits of the sardars).

The portraits occupied a dominant place in the architectural decoration of the palace's interior. Here were portraits of Fatali Shah, his heir Abbas Mirza, Sardar Huseyn-Quli and his brother. Judging by the sketches of the Russian artists V. Moshkov and G. Gagarin, who visited this palace in the first half of the 19th century, and by to the descriptions of other travelers, these portraits were distinguished by their liveliness and great similarity, although in general, they also wore a decorative, somewhat a conditional character. There were eight large portraits in the Mirror Hall of the palace. Some of them had inscriptions in the Azerbaijani language.

The hall continued with a platform and a fountain in the middle, both marble paved. In the entire height of the site, from the side of the river, there was a huge wooden window with a frame of openwork with multi-colored glass inserted.

On the sides of the marble platform there were two small rooms and their doors opened onto the Hall of Mirrors. The ceilings and the walls of these rooms were motley decorated with simple paintings. The back side of the Hall of Mirrors, facing the courtyard, was glazed and entirely in small frames. Before the renovation of the 1850s, this whole side was in the same frames with whimsical patterns and multi-colored glass as on the marble platform. During the renovation, the remnants of these frames were destroyed, and ordinary frames, painted with red paint, were inserted in their place. During the renovation, the hall was covered with an iron roof, painted in red, and the marble pool located in the courtyard, in the front of the hall, was destroyed.

At the time of the Sardars, the entire back side of the Hall of Mirrors was hung with a large "golden curtain", which was pulled back by eight people. By the beginning of the 20th century, the cornice with the iron blocks of this curtain was preserved.

The palace's architecture was stylistically connected with that of the Sheki Khans Palace and the late Fevid Garden and park pavilions.

In 1827, in one of the palace's rooms, Alexander Griboyedov took part in the production of his comedy the "Grief from the Mind" performed by the officers of the Russian army. In 1864, after the relocation of the governor's residence from the Sardar Palace to the center of Erivan, the fortress was abolished, its walls and buildings, including the palace gradually were destroyed. The old building was left unattended and the local population pulled it apart piece by piece. At the beginning of the 20th century, the palace was under the jurisdiction of the military engineer of the Alexandropol distance, however this did not lead to the safety maintenance of the palace. On its territory lived a watchman who looked after the Hall of Mirrors and once a year wiped the portraits with kerosene to avoid their damage. According to the published notes of Alexander Kolchinsky, from his travel to the Caucasus in 1902, during the renovation of the Mirror Hall, the original interior elements were replaced with modern ones, the hall was covered with an iron roof and painted in red, while the pool was destroyed. The walls of the palace "were full of all kinds of names, surnames and obscene inscriptions". In 1914 the palace was completely ruined.

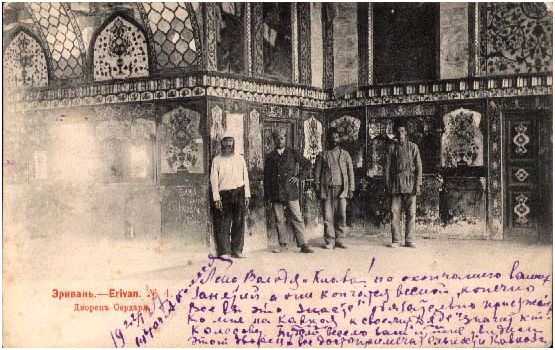
On an old postcard

The National Gallery of Georgia keeps items of the Qajar period from the Sardar Palace related to the Erivan Khanate. Among them there are household items, paintings, as well as marble slabs that were part of the decor of the palace's complex. In 2019, these items were restored and exhibited for the first time in Baku, at the Heydar Aliyev Cultural Center.

During the desolation times, the palace was covered with inscriptions made by travelers and tourists. One of the inscriptions was a kind of poem left on 20 March 1895, according to the watchman, by a certain lady who was traveling from Qajar Empire:

The inscription on the palace's wall left by an unknown author:
So here it is, the monument to a past greatness
The Mirror motley Hall, the judgment seat of people.
Currently wandering in the field of shadows,
However, many years ago being so loud here
By your mighty voice and the song of the young wives.
Magically reflected on the mirrored walls
The lit lights from all around,
And the marble fountain pulled like a cold stream,
As a cascade fell, in silver granulation.
Murmuring mysteriously, magnificently dispersing,
Glittering, iridescent as an enchanting fire ...
Now everything is here dead, the loud talk is no more heard,
As wondrous key, the life-giving stream does not pour.
Death softly closed the lips of the sonorous song,
And the grave silence blows in the palace.
The scary portraits of long ago past centuries,
Gaze thoughtfully from the ruined walls
At midnight their shadows, like those of the air nymphs
On silent marble slabs
Sadly... are heard...
Sardar's proud palace as a statue stands
Cold marble...
Fast on Zangu...
She still winds as a wide ribbon,
Glitters like a snake with silvery scales,
And forever young, playful, rushes
To a distant land in a brilliant wave.
He, Sardar, the great son of Islam,
The king of Erivan, formidable scourge of people,
Now voiceless spirit of dwellings, graves with no glory
A wandering shadow in the silence of the nights.
– 20 March 1895

== See also ==
- House of Panah Khan Makinski

== Sources ==
- Александр Кольчицкий (1903). Зеркальный зал в Сардарском дворце, в гор. Эривани.
- Н. Миклашевская (1954). Художники XIX века Мирза Кадым Эривани и Мир Мохсун Навваб. Baku: Издательство Академии наук Азербайджанской ССР.
