= Arjut =

Arjut Արջուտ
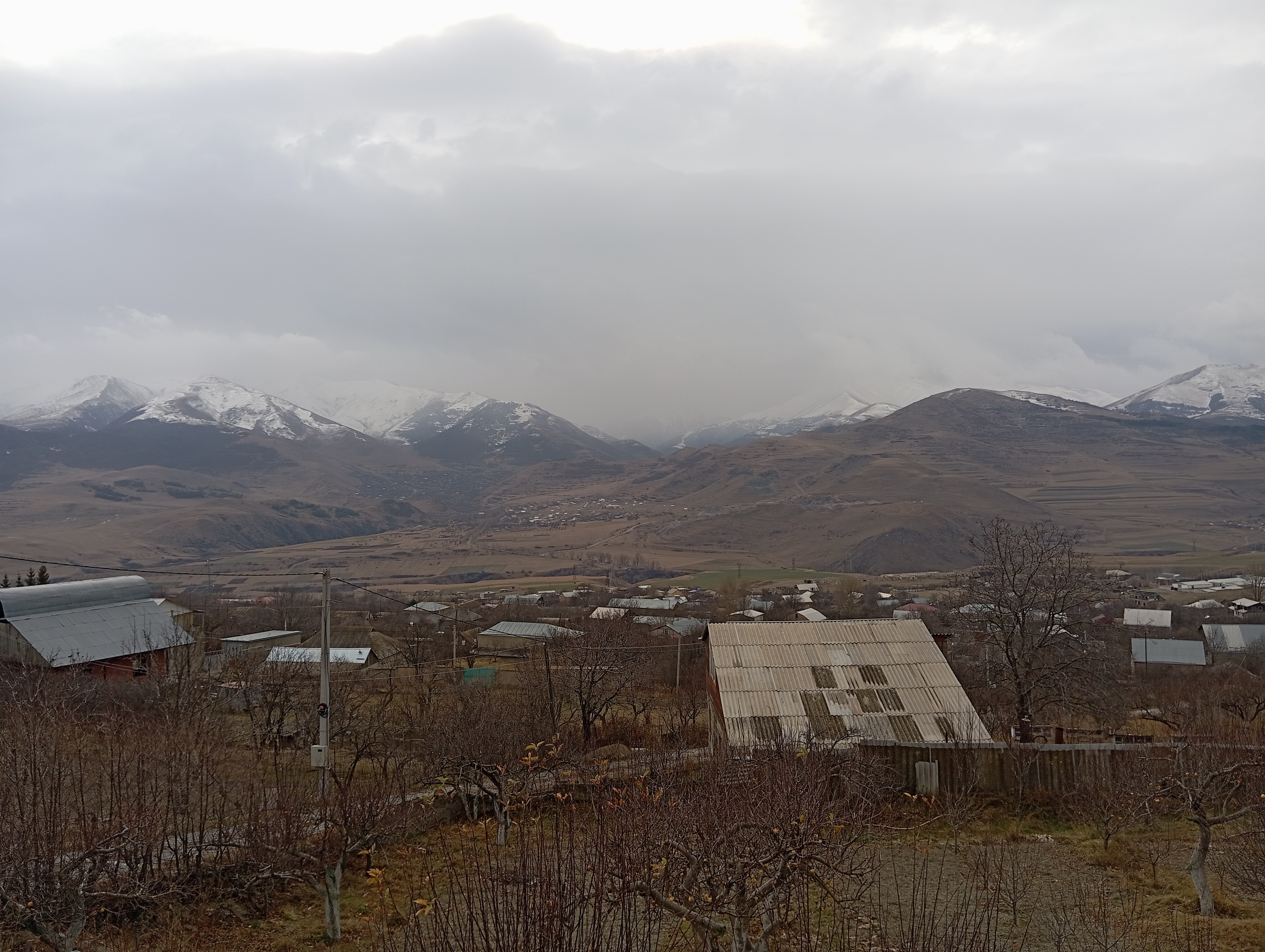

- Location within Armenia
- Coordinates: 40°51′47″N 44°22′56″E
- Country: Armenia
- Province: Lori
- Elevation: 1,450 m (4,760 ft)

Population (2011)
  - Total: 1,043
- Time zone: UTC+4 (AMT)

Arjut (Armenian: Արջուտ) is a village in the Lori Province of Armenia.
