= Erivan Fortress =

Armenian Fortress

Yerevan Fortress
- Left bank of Hrazdan River (in the place of Ararat Wine Factory); Yerevan, Armenia
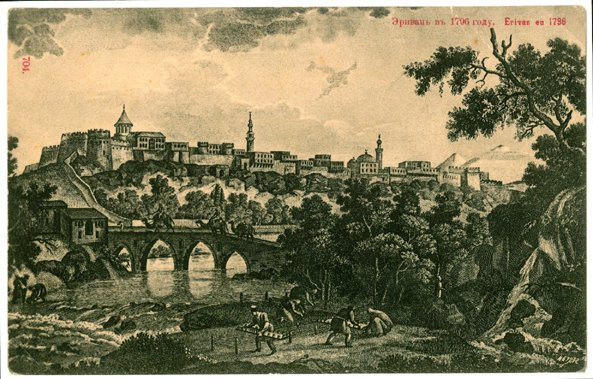
- View of Yerevan in 1796 by G. Sergeevich.

Site information
- Condition: Demolished

Location
- Coordinates: 40.173056°N 44.502778°E

Site history
- Built: 1582–83
- In use: Erivan Sardars' seat (until 1827); Armenian Oblast Governor's(1828–40) Erivan Governorate's Governor (1850–64)
- Demolished: 1860s–1930s
- Battles/wars: Turkish-Persian War, 1623-39; Turkish-Persian War, 1722-27; Turkish-Persian War, 1730-36; Russo-Persian War, 1826-28

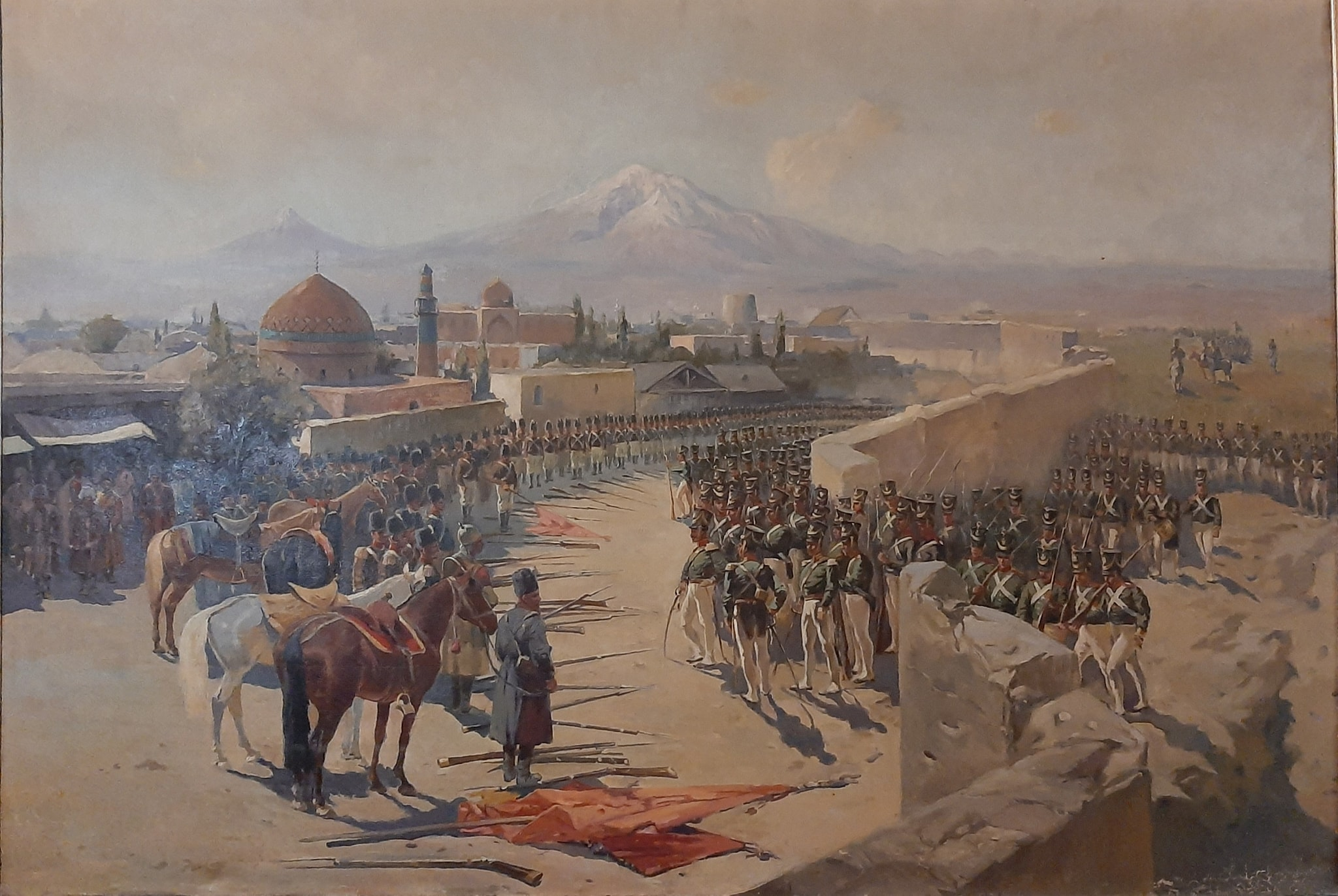
Yerevan fortress siege in 1827 by the Russian forces under leadership of Ivan Paskevich by Franz Roubaud.

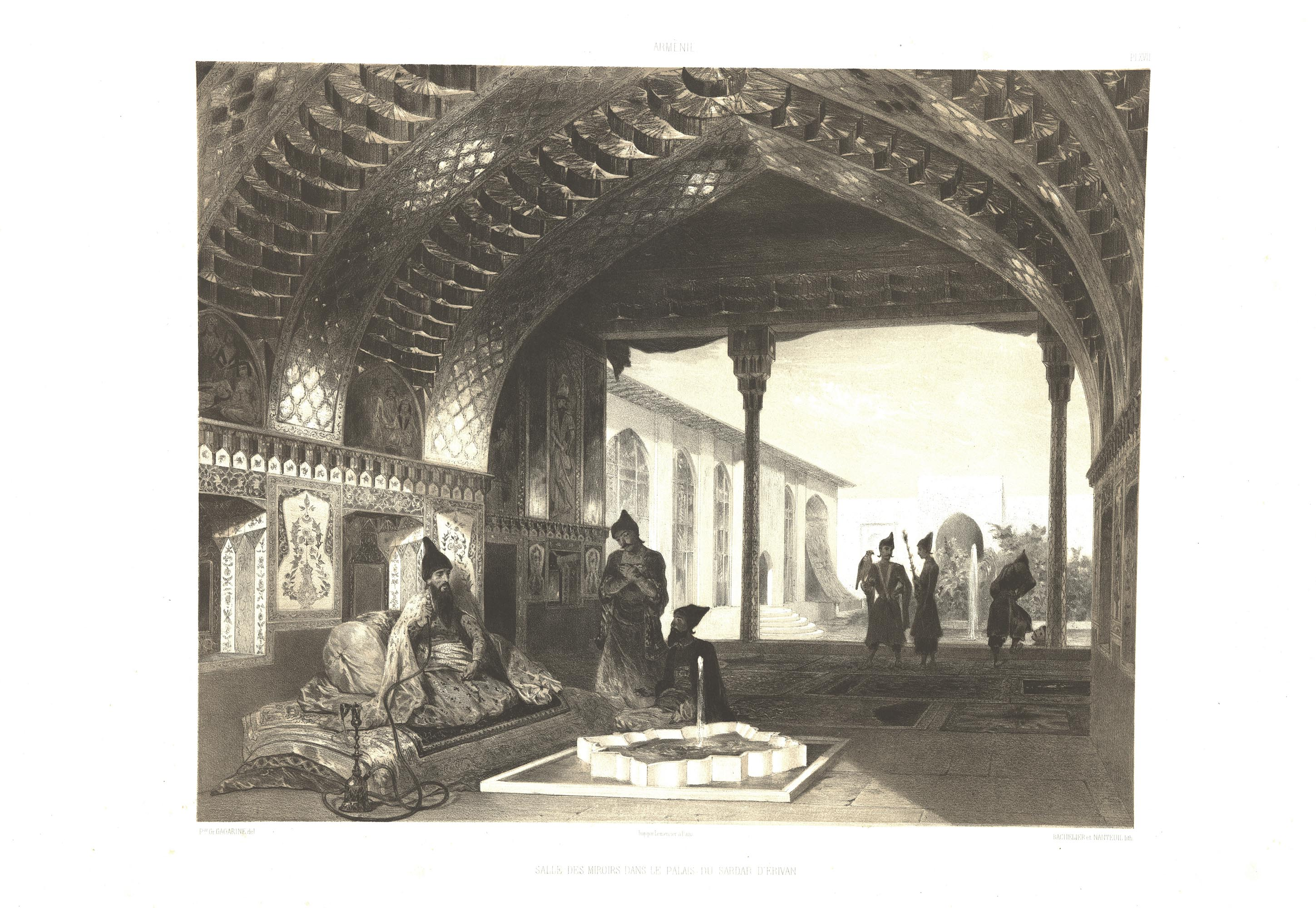
The Hall of Mirrors (Shushaband-ayva) in the Sardar's Palace.

Erivan Fortress or Yerevan Fortress (Armenian: Երևանի բերդը; Yerevani berdë; Persian: قلعه ایروان, Ghaleh-ye Iravân; Russian: Эриванская крепость E'rivanskaya krepost' ) was a 16th-century fortress in Yerevan.

== History ==
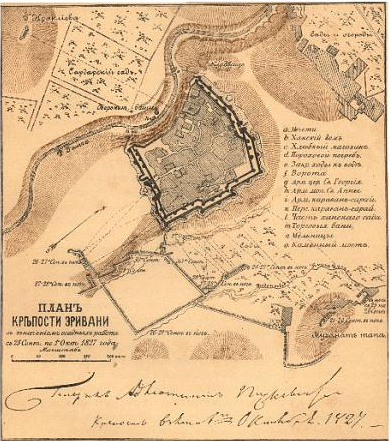
Plan of the Erivan Fortress, 1827

The fortress was built during the Ottoman rule in 1582–83 by Serdar Ferhat Pasha. The fortress was destroyed by an earthquake in 1679. After the earthquake, the Safavid governor of Erivan, Zal Khan, asked the Shah for help to rebuild Erivan, including the fortress and the Palace of the Sardars.

In 1853, the fortress was ruined by another earthquake. In 1865 the territory of the fortress was purchased by Nerses Tairyants, a merchant of the first guild. Later in 1880s, Tairyants built a brandy factory in the northern part of the fortress. The fortress was completely demolished in 1930s during the Soviet rule, although some parts of the defensive walls still remain.

== Description ==
The Erivan Fortress was considered to be a small town separate from the city. It was separated from the city with large and unwrought space. The fortress was rectangular with a perimeter of about 1,200 metres (4,000 ft). It was walled on three sides; on the fourth (western) it was flanked by the Hrazdan River gorge. The gorge on the north-western part of the fortress had a depth of 300 sazhen (640 meters). As it was considered inaccessible it was not walled. The earth mound was considered as a wall.

The Erivan Fortress had three gateways on its double line battlements: Tabriz, Shirvan and Korpu. The walls had towers like old eastern castles. Each wall had an iron gate, and each one had its guard. The garrison had about 2,000 soldiers. There were 800 houses inside the fortress. The permanent residents of the fortress were local Muslims only. Although Armenians were allowed to work in the markets during the day, they had to lock up and return to their homes in Shahar (the main town) at night.

== Interior ==
=== Sardar's Palace ===
The palace was in the north-western part of the fortress. The palace hanged on the Hrazdan gorge. It was a square wide building with many sections. The harem was one of the biggest sections, it was 61 metres (200 ft) long and 38 metres (125 ft) wide. It was divided into many rooms and corridors. This palace was built in 1798 during the reign of Huseyn-Ali khan's son, Mahmud.

All palaces built previously had been destroyed whenever the khans built a new one. The last was built in 1798 in Persian architectural style, containing "Shushaband-ayva" ("A Hall of Mirrors"), whose cornice was covered with colorful glass. The ceiling was decorated by the pictures of sparkling flowers. And in the walls of the hall were eight images drawn on the canvas: Fat′h-Ali Shah, Huseyn-Ghuli and Hasan, Abbas Mirza, Faramarz, etc.

After the capture of Erivan by the Russians, in one of the halls of the palace, Aleksandr Griboyedov's famous comedy, Woe from Wit, was performed by the military garrison with stand by of the author. A marble memorial plaque which commemorates the performance is in the Yerevan Ararat Wine Factory, which currently occupies the location where the fortress once existed.

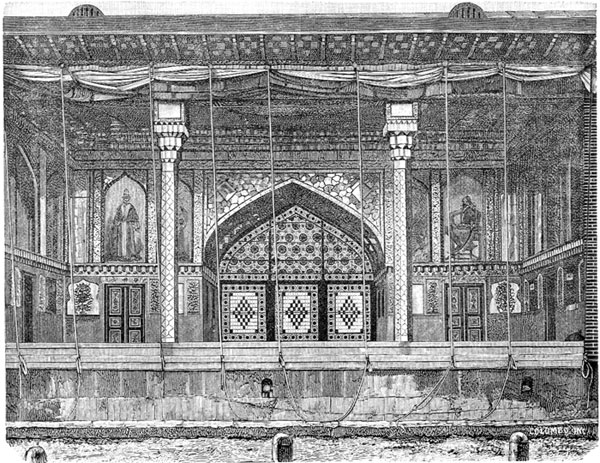
The interior of the Saradar Palace

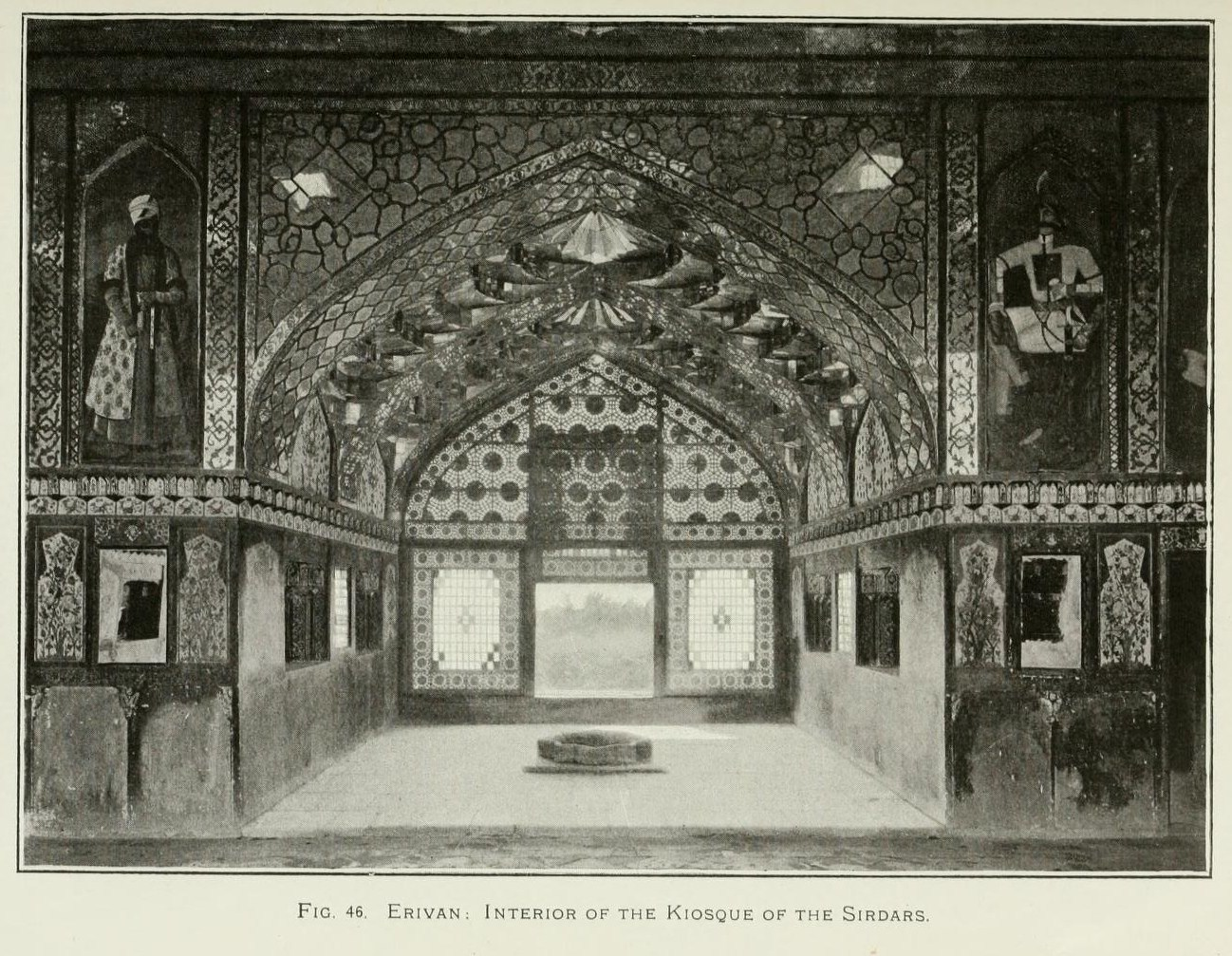
Interior of the Kiosque of the Sirdars

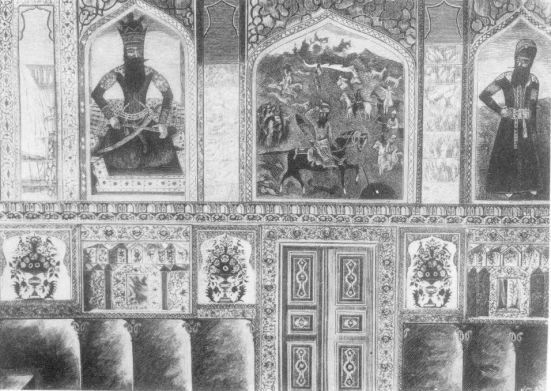
A detail of wall decoration of the Sardar Palace, 1828, by an Azerbaijani artist Mirza Gadim Iravani

=== Harem and the bath ===
The inner walls of khan's harem were covered by marble, with colorful patterns. There was a swimming pool (measurements were 15 sazhen (32 meters) in length, 4 sazhen (9 meters) in width and 3 arshin (2,1 meters) in depth).

=== Mosques ===
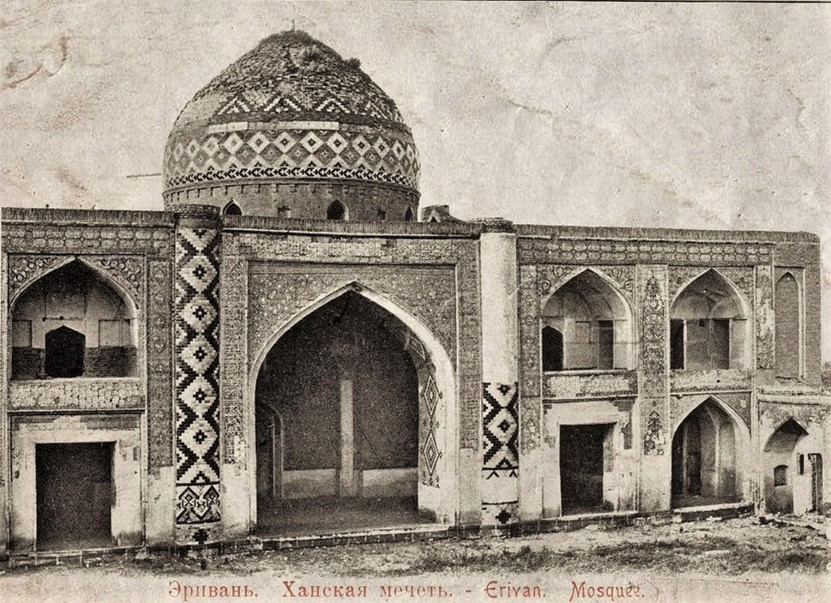
Abbas Mirza Mosque

There were two late Safavi era mosques inside the Erivan Fortress. One was Rajab-Pasha Mosque; the other was Abbas Mirza Mosque. The ruins of Rajab-Pasha Mosque remained until the beginning of the works of reconstruction of Erivan in 1930s.

==== Rajab-Pasha Mosque ====
This mosque was built in 1725 during the reign of Turkish Rajab-Pasha khan. It was a 4-columned arched big building with beautiful exterior. During the Iranian rule it was used as an arsenal, because it was a Sunni mosque, and the new owners, the Iranians, were Shia Muslims. In 1827, this mosque was converted to a Russian Orthodox church, and named after the Holy Virgin.

==== Abbas Mirza Mosque (Sardar's Mosque) ====
This mosque was Shia and was built in the beginning of the nineteenth century, during the reign of the last khan of Erivan Khanate Huseyn-khan. It was a Shia mosque, called “Abbas Mirza Jami”, named for the son of Huseyn-khan. The façade was covered by green and blue glass, usually found in Iranian-style architecture. After the capture of Erivan by the Russians, the mosque was used as an arsenal. During Soviet times the mosque, along with other religious structures (Armenian churches, temples and monasteries) was derelict and currently only the frame of the mosque has been preserved.

== Gallery ==
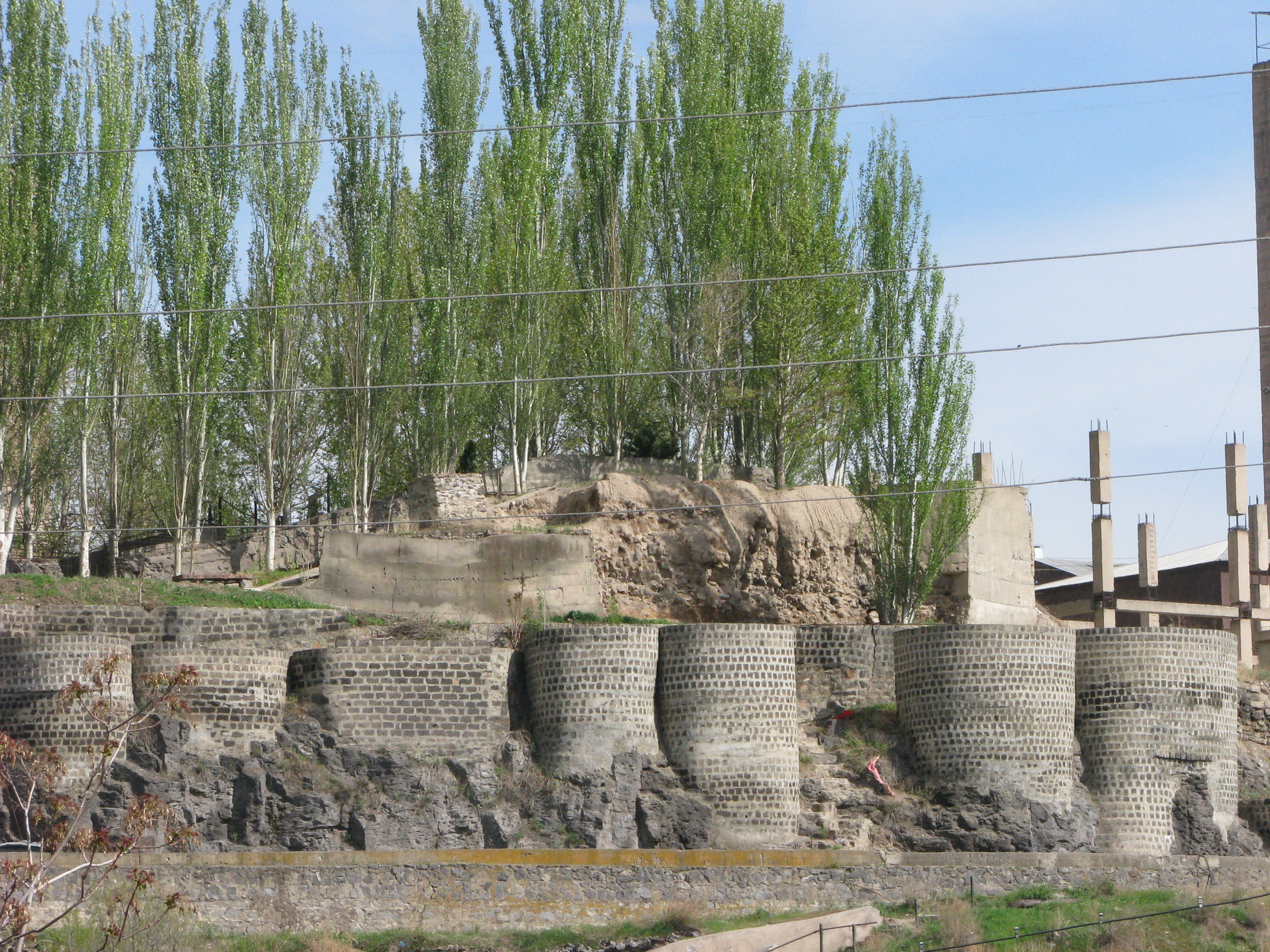
Preserved parts of Erivan fortress

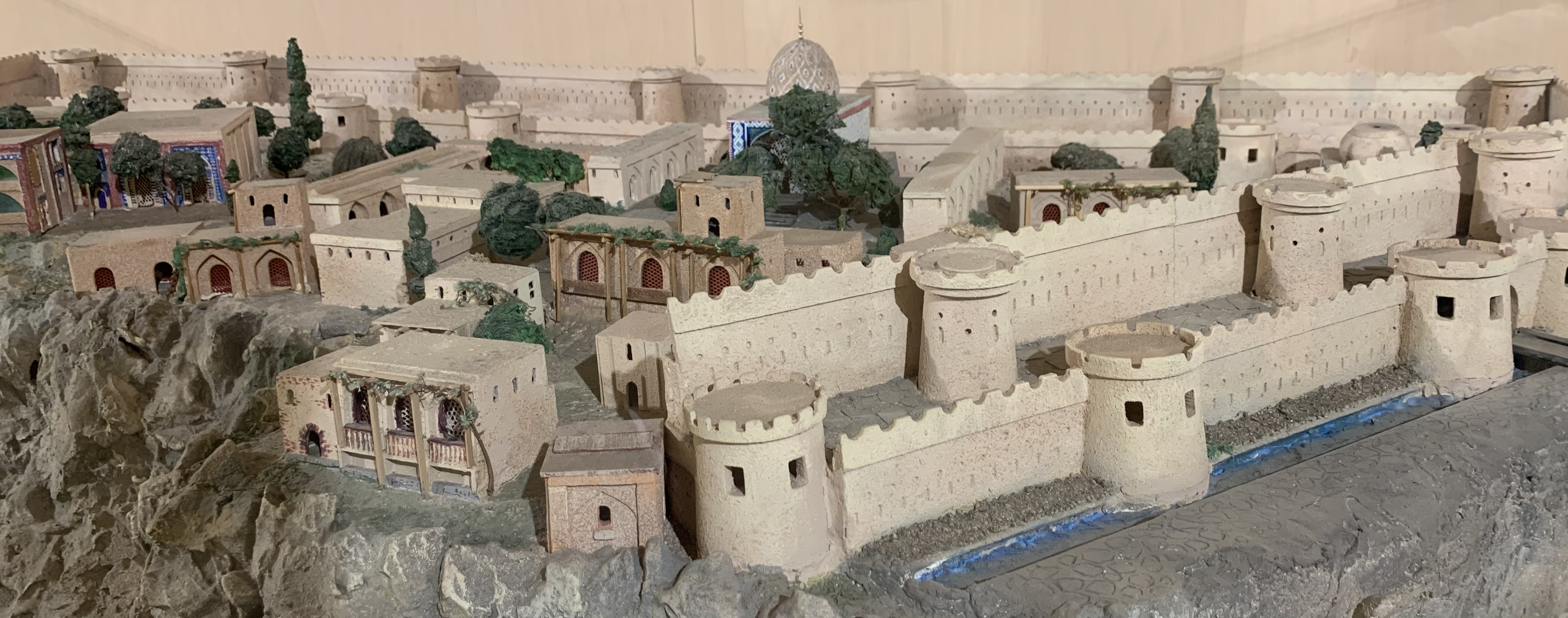
Erivan fortress model in Yerevan city museum

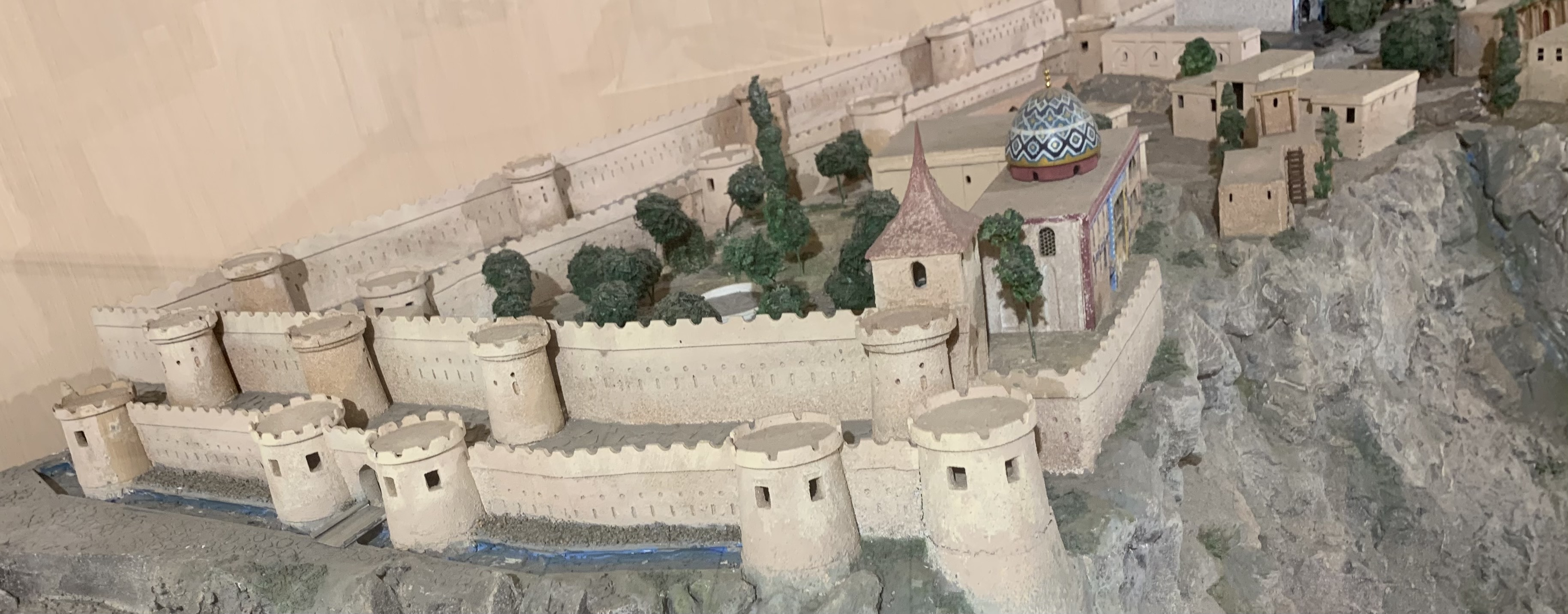

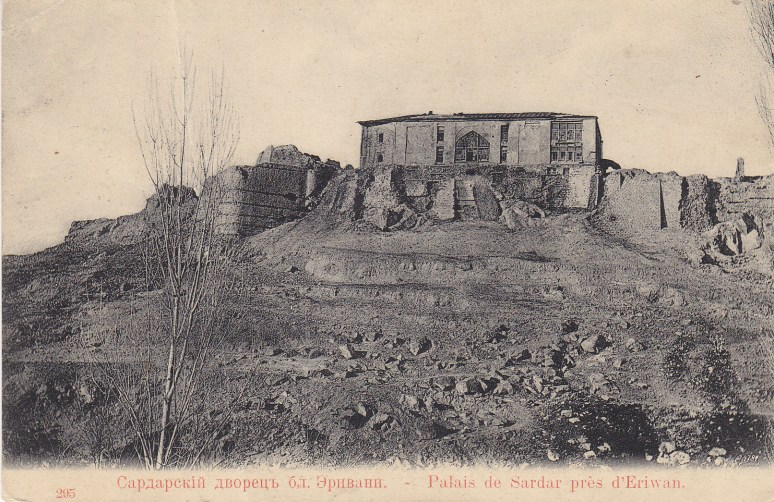
View of Erivan palace from Hrazdan river

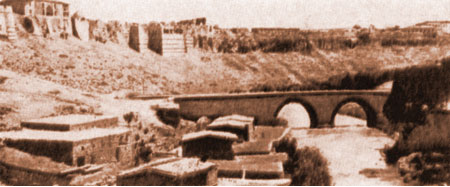

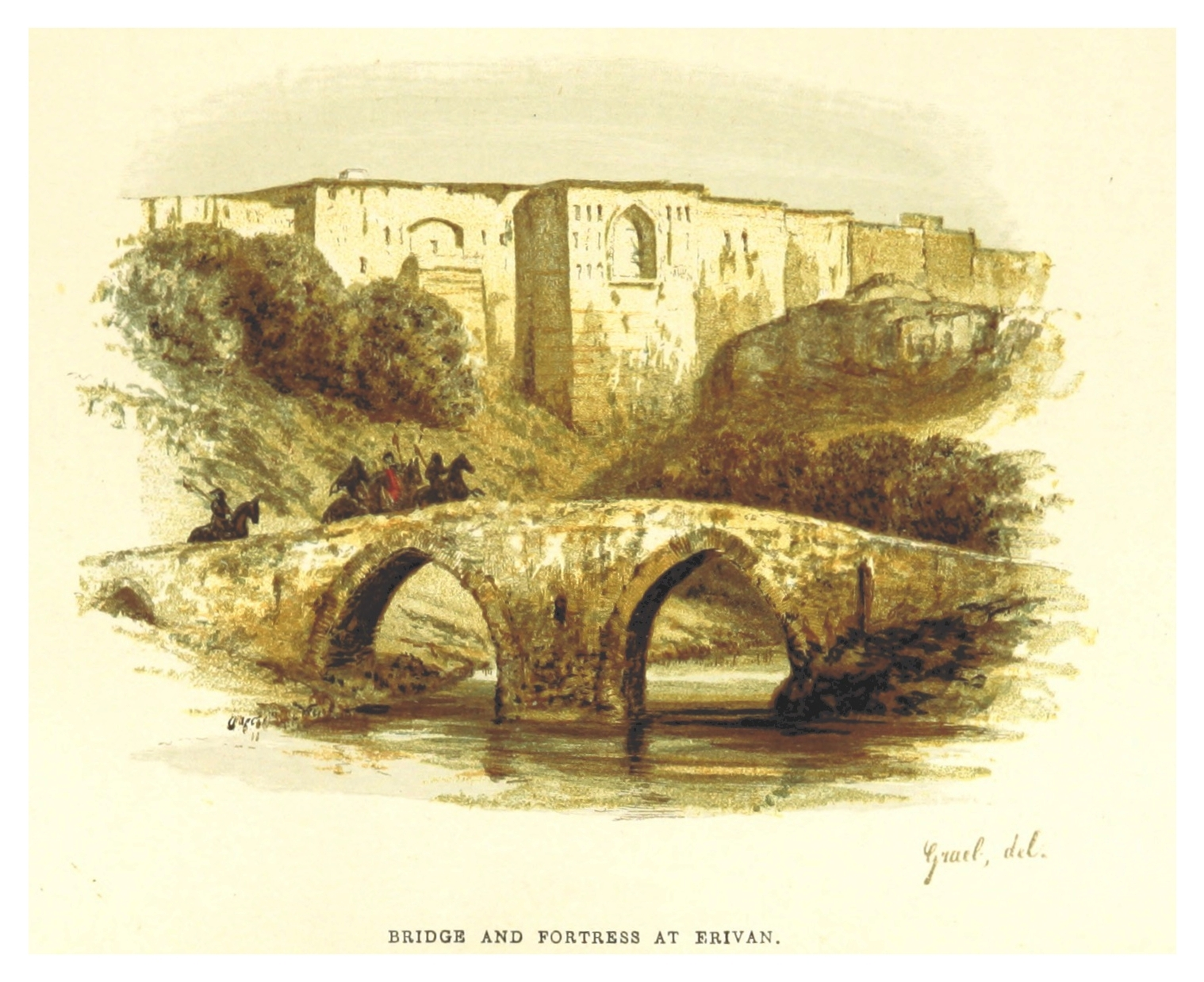
Bridge and the fortress of Yerevan

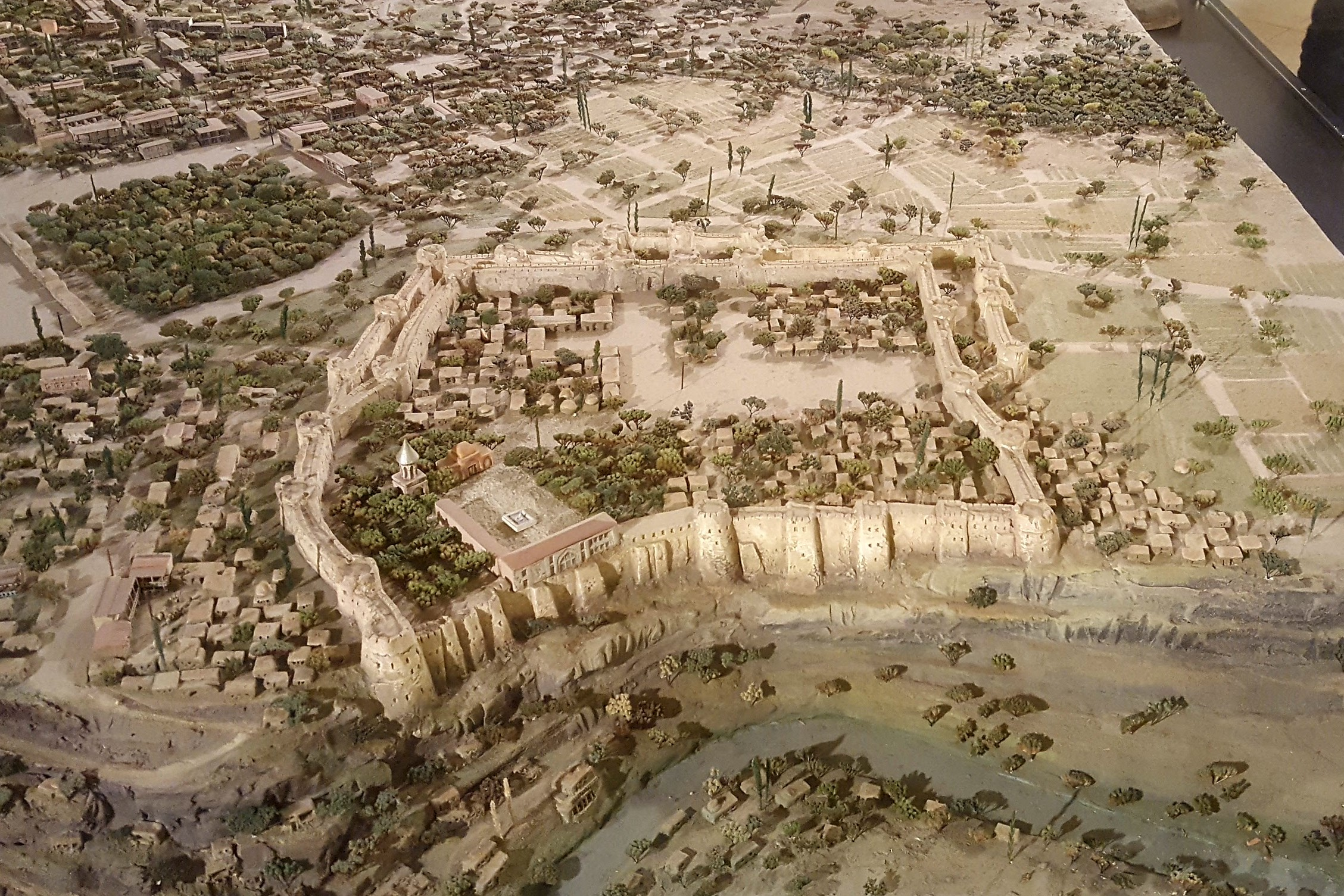
Yerevan fortress 3D Model

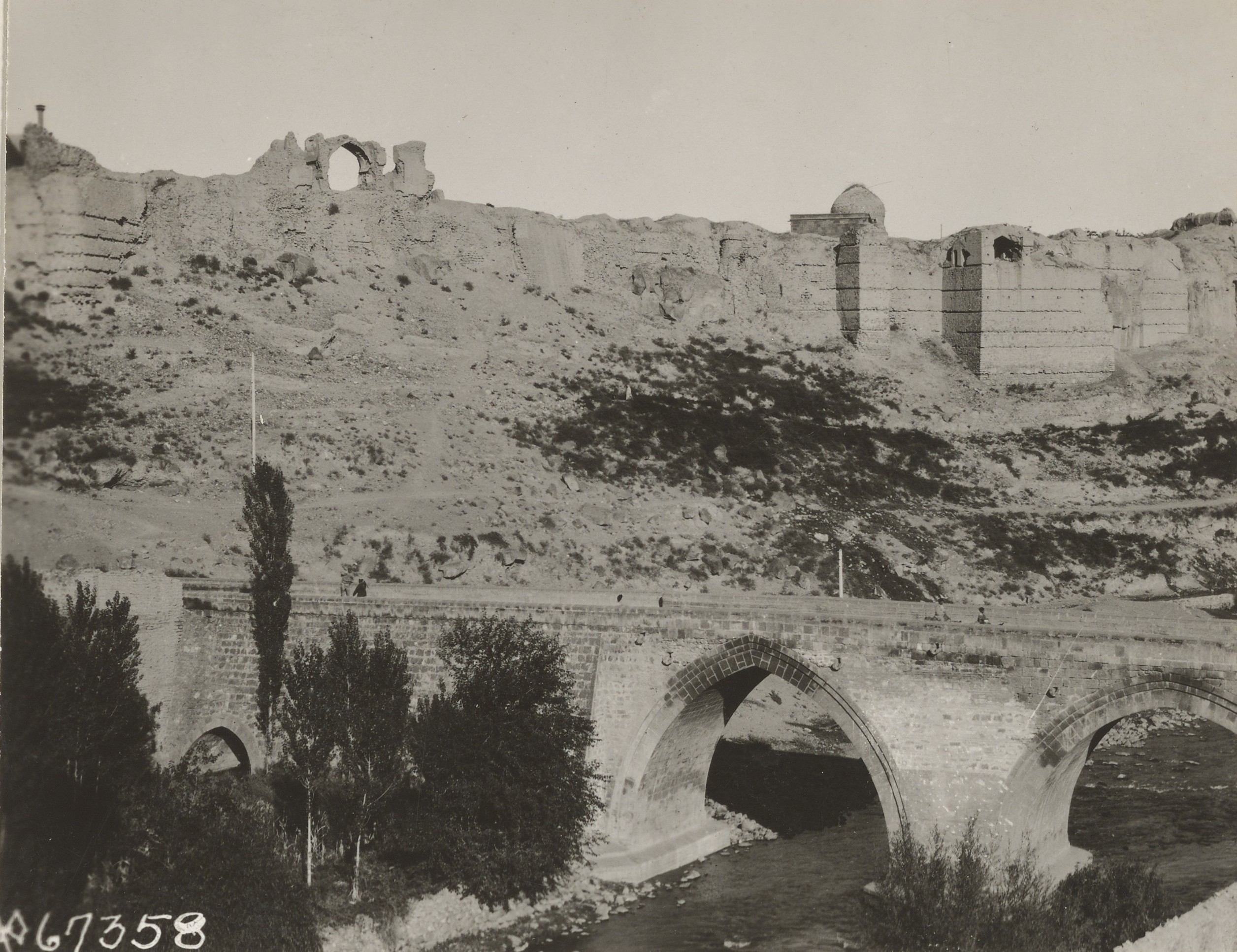
Ruins in 1919

== See also ==
- History of Yerevan
- Erivan Khanate
