= House of Panah Khan Makinski =

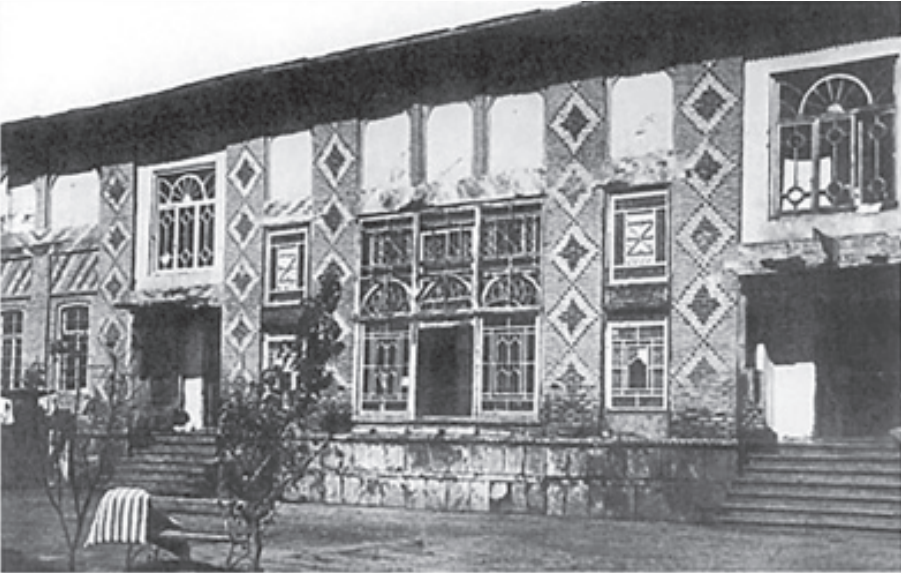

General information
- Location: Yerevan, Armenia
- Completed: 19th century
- Owner: Panah Khan Makinski

Design and construction
- Architect: Unknown

House of Panah Khan Makinski was a historic palace-type residential complex located in Yerevan, Armenia.

== About ==
The house or mansion of Panah Khan Makinski was built in the style of the Khan's palace in Yerevan. The residential complex belonging to Panah Khan, the son of Suleyman Khan, an Iranian and member of the Yerevan City Duma, a college advisor, is located in the square named after him, at Nalbandyan Street-19 (former Ter-Gukasov Street). The complex included the khan's two-story house, kitchen, storeroom, one-story house for servants and stables in separate courtyards. The building was included in the list of architectural monuments protected by the state in Yerevan, but in the 1960s and 1970s, it became unrecognizable after inappropriate objects were built around the building and reached the point of extinction due to neglect. The area where Panah Khan Makinsky's house is located was called Panah Khan Square or Panah Khan Boulevar.

From the beginning of the 20th century, one of the places where theater lovers gathered for performances in the city of Yerevan was the house of Panah Khan Makinsky. Among those plays were Mirza Fatali Akhundzade's "Monsieur Jordan and the Dervish Mastali Shah" (1901, 1903, 1904, 1905, 1906), Vasag Madatov Nazmin's "Girt-Girt" (1900, 1903), "Greed wins the enemy" (1903, 1905, 1906), Najaf Bey Vazirov's "Haji Qanbar" (1904, 1908), "A Picture of Home Education" (1905, 1906, 1908), Rustam Khan's "Aqdi Bimahabbat" (1906), Namig Kamal's "Homeland" (1908), Abdurrahim Hagverdiyev's "Unfortunate Young Man" (1909, 1910).

== See also ==
- Alexander Makinsky

== Literature ==
- Mustafa, Nazim (2020). İrəvan şəhəri / The city of Iravan (PDF). Baku: Red N Line. ISBN 978-9952-37-473-5.
- Çingizoğlu, Ənvər (2011). Makinskilər/ Makinskis (PDF). Baku: Soy.
