= Iranian Armenia (1502–1828) =

Period when Eastern Armenia was part of the Iranian empire

- 1502–1828
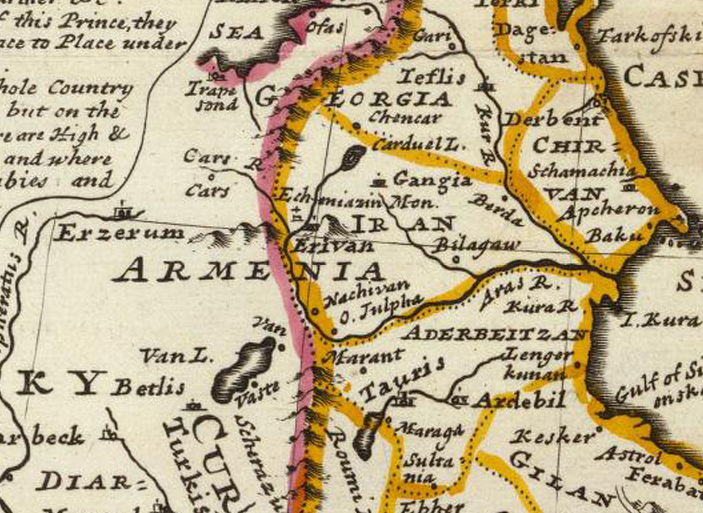
- Part of a map of the Safavid Empire
- Status: 1502–1747: Affiliated to the Iranian empires 1747–1828: Consisting of Yerevan and Nakhichevan khanates of Iran
- Common languages: Armenian (native): Persian; Azerbaijani
- Historical era: Renaissance
  - Established: 1502
  - Disestablished: 1828
Preceded by	Succeeded by
Aq Qoyunlu	Russian Empire

From 1502 to 1828, during the early modern and late modern era, Eastern Armenia was part of the Iranian empire. Armenians have a history of being divided since the time of the Byzantine Empire and the Sassanid Empire, in the early 5th century. While the two sides of Armenia were sometimes reunited, this became a permanent aspect of the Armenian people.

Following the Arab and Seljuk conquests of Armenia, the western portion, which was initially part of Byzantium, became eventually part of the Ottoman Empire, otherwise known as Ottoman Armenia, while the eastern portion became and was kept part of the Iranian Safavid Empire, Afsharid Empire and Qajar Empire, until it became part of the Russian Empire in the course of the 19th century, following the Treaty of Turkmenchay of 1828.

== Safavid Empire ==
Due to its strategic significance, Armenia was constantly fought over and passed back and forth between the dominion of Iran and the Ottomans. At the height of the Ottoman-Persian Wars, Yerevan changed hands fourteen times between 1514 and 1736.

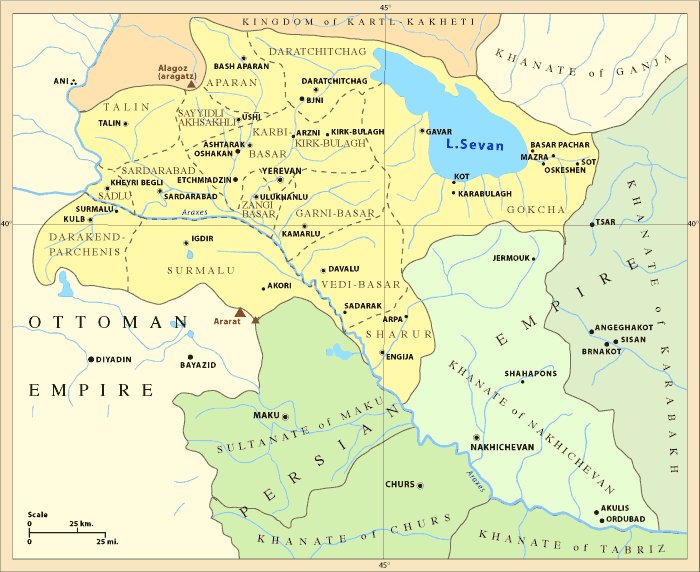
Map of the Erivan khanate

In 1604, Shah Abbas I pursued a scorched earth campaign against the Ottomans in the Ararat valley. The old Armenian town of Julfa in the province of Nakhichevan was taken early in the invasion. From there, Abbas' army fanned out across the Araratian plain. The Shah pursued a careful strategy, advancing and retreating as the occasion demanded, determined not to risk his enterprise in a direct confrontation with stronger enemy forces.

While laying siege to Kars, he learned of the approach of a large Ottoman army, commanded by Djghazadé Sinan Pasha. The order to withdraw was given; but to deny the enemy the potential to resupply themselves from the land, he ordered the wholesale destruction of the Armenian towns and farms on the plain. As part of this, the whole population was ordered to accompany the Iranian army in its withdrawal. Some 300,000 people were duly herded to the banks of the Araxes River. Julfa was treated as a special case; he entrusted its evacuation to a renegade Georgian prince, Hanis Thahmaz-Ghuli Bek. He told Julfa's residents that they had three days to prepare for deportation to Iran; anyone still in town after those three days would be killed. Those who attempted to resist the mass deportation were killed outright. The Shah had previously ordered the destruction of the only bridge, and although Iranian soldiers helped the Julfaites to cross on horses and camels, the rest of the deportees had to cross on their own, so people were forced into the waters, where a great many drowned, carried away by the currents, before reaching the opposite bank. This was only the beginning of their ordeal. One eyewitness, Father de Guyan, describes the predicament of the refugees thus:

It was not only the winter cold that was causing torture and death to the deportees. The greatest suffering came from hunger. The provisions which the deportees had brought with them were soon consumed... The children were crying for food or milk, none of which existed, because the women's breasts had dried up from hunger... Many women, hungry and exhausted, would leave their famished children on the roadside, and continue their tortuous journey. Some would go to nearby forests in search of something to eat. Usually they would not come back. Often those who died, served as food for the living.

Unable to maintain his army on the desolate plain, Sinan Pasha was forced to winter in Van. Armies sent in pursuit of the Shah in 1605 were defeated, and by 1606 Abbas had regained all of the territory lost to the Turks earlier in his reign. The scorched-earth tactic had worked, though at a terrible cost to the Armenian people. Of the 300,000 deported, it is estimated that under half survived the march to Isfahan. In the conquered territories, Abbas established the Erivan khanate, a Muslim principality under the dominion of the Safavid Empire. As a result of the continuous wars in the region and Shah Abbas I's deportation of much of the Armenian population from the Ararat valley and the surrounding region, in 1605 Armenians formed less than 20% of its population.

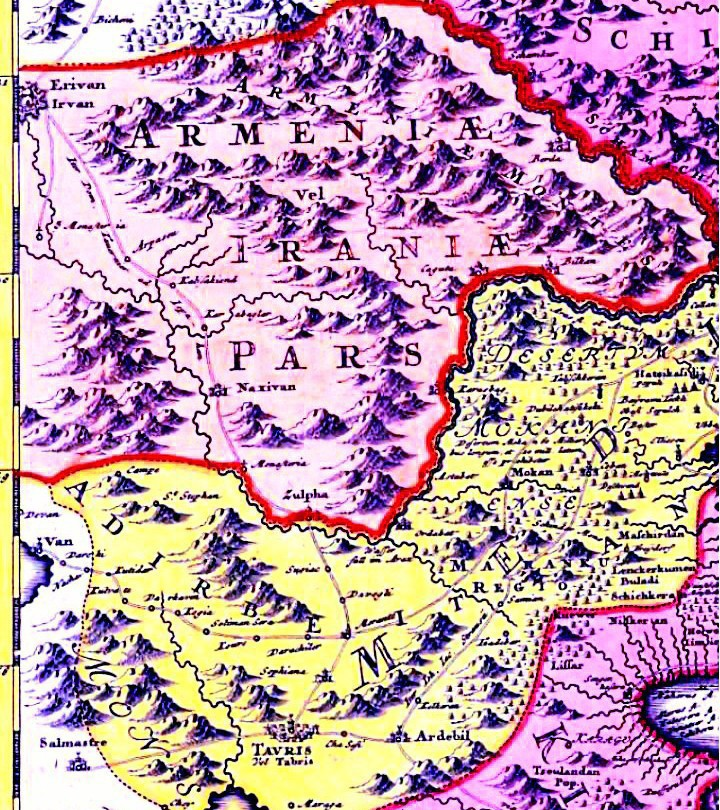
Iranian Armenia XVII-XVIII centuries

== Governors ==
=== Safavid ===
- Div Sultan Rumlu (1516–1527)
- Shahqoli Soltan Ustajlu
- Tokhmaq Khan Ustajlu (1568–1575) - 1st term
- Abu Torab Soltan
- Khalil Khan Afshar
- Tokhmaq Khan Ustajlu (1578–1583) - 2nd term
- Abbasqoli Khan Qajar
- Safi Khan Lezgi (1666–1674)
- Saru Beg
- Safiqoli Khan (1674–1679)
- Zal Khan
- Abd al-Masud Khan
- Mohammad-Ali Khan of Yerevan (?–1716)
- Mohammad-Ali Khan's son (1716–?)
- Kay Khosrow Khan Cherkes
- Mohammad-Qoli Khan of Yerevan (1654–1656)
- Najafqoli Khan Cherkes (1656–1663)
- Abbasqoli Khan
- Constantine II of Kakheti (1722–?)

== See also ==
- Russian Armenia
- Blue Mosque, Yerevan
- Abbas Mirza Mosque, Yerevan
- Shah Abbas Mosque, Yerevan
- Ottoman Armenia
- Sasanian Armenia

== Sources ==
- Bournoutian, George A. (1980). "The Population of Persian Armenia Prior to and Immediately Following Its Annexation to the Russian Empire, 1826-1832". Wilson Center, Kennan Institute for Advanced Russian Studies: 1–16.
- Olson; et al. (1994). An Ethnohistorical Dictionary of the Russian and Soviet Empires. Greenwood Publishing Group. pp. 44–45. ISBN 978-0313274978.
- Nasiri, Ali Naqi; Floor, Willem M. (2008). Titles and Emoluments in Safavid Iran: A Third Manual of Safavid Administration. Mage Publishers. ISBN 978-1933823232.
- Matthee, Rudi (2012). Persia in Crisis: Safavid Decline and the Fall of Isfahan. I.B.Tauris. ISBN 978-1845117450.
- Floor, Willem M. (2008). Titles and Emoluments in Safavid Iran: A Third Manual of Safavid Administration, by Mirza Naqi Nasiri. Washington, DC: Mage Publishers. ISBN 978-1933823232.
- Bournoutian, George A. (2016). The 1820 Russian Survey of the Khanate of Shirvan: A Primary Source on the Demography and Economy of an Iranian Province prior to its Annexation by Russia. Gibb Memorial Trust. p. xvii. ISBN 978-1909724808. "Serious historians and geographers agree that after the fall of the Safavids, and especially from the mid-eighteenth century, the territory of the South Caucasus was composed of the khanates of Ganja, Kuba, Shirvan, Baku, Talesh, Sheki, Karabagh, Nakhichivan and Yerevan, all of which were under Iranian suzerainty."
- Hewsen, Robert H. (2001). Armenia: A Historical Atlas. The University of Chicago Press. p. 168. ISBN 0-226-33228-4.
- von Haxthausen, Baron (2000). Transcaucasia: Sketches of the Nations and Races between the Black Sea and the Caspian. Adamant Media Corporation. p. 252. ISBN 1-4021-8367-4.
