= Charles Aznavour Square =

Charles Aznavour Square may refer to:

- Charles Aznavour Square, Gyumri, Armenia
- Charles Aznavour Square, Yerevan, Armenia
