= Abovyan (disambiguation) =

Abovyan (Armenian: Աբովյան) is a town in the Kotayk Province, Armenia.

Abovyan may also refer to:

- Abovyan City Stadium
- FC Abovyan based in Abovyan City
- Saint John the Baptist Church, Abovyan
- Abovyan mine in Kotayk Province, Armenia
- Abovyan, Ararat, a village in Armenia
- Khachatur Abovian (1809–1848), Armenian writer
  - Abovyan Street in Yerevan, Armenia
  - Khachatur Abovyan Park in Yerevan, Armenia
- Yuriy Abovyan (born 1931), Soviet swimmer
