= List of squares in Yerevan =

This is a list of the principal squares of Yerevan, the capital of Armenia.

== Kentron District ==
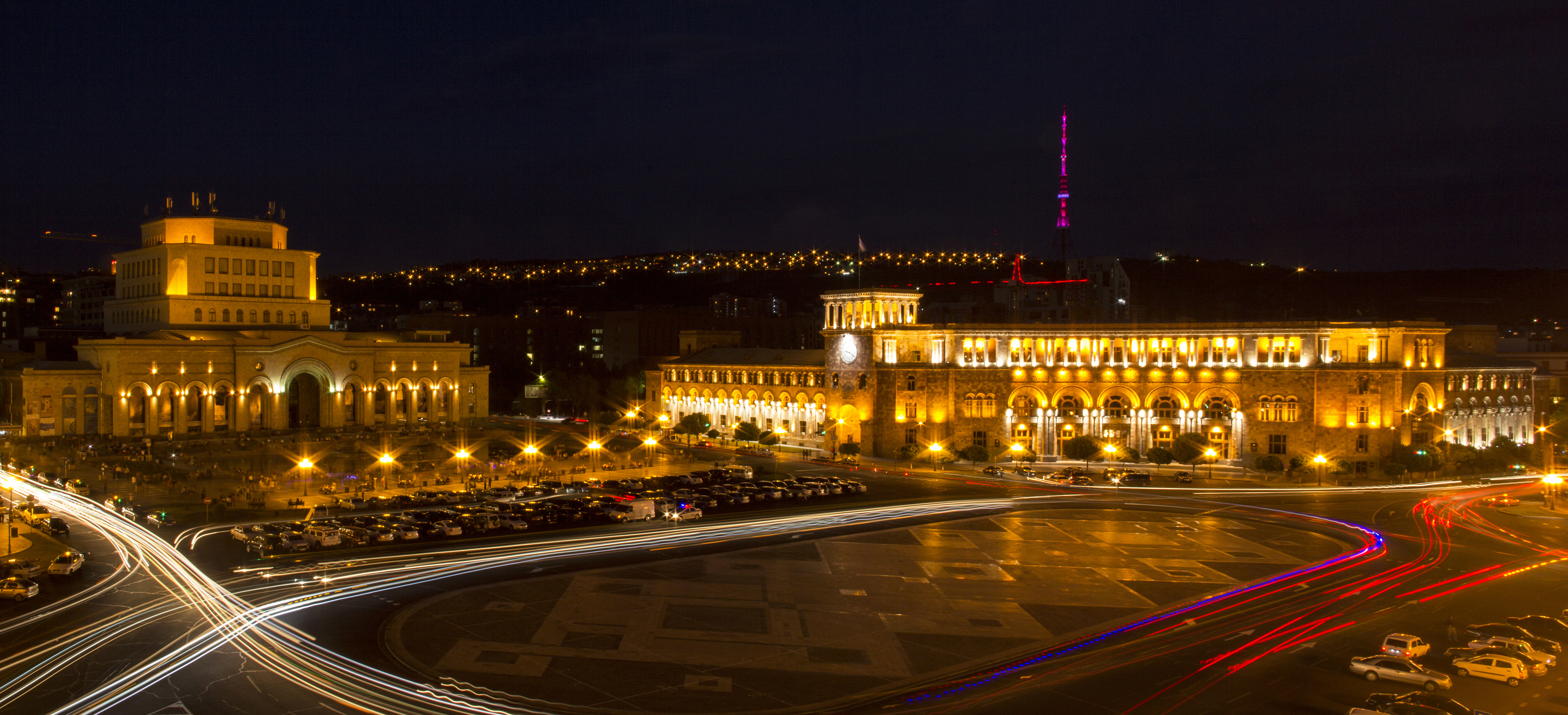
Republic Square

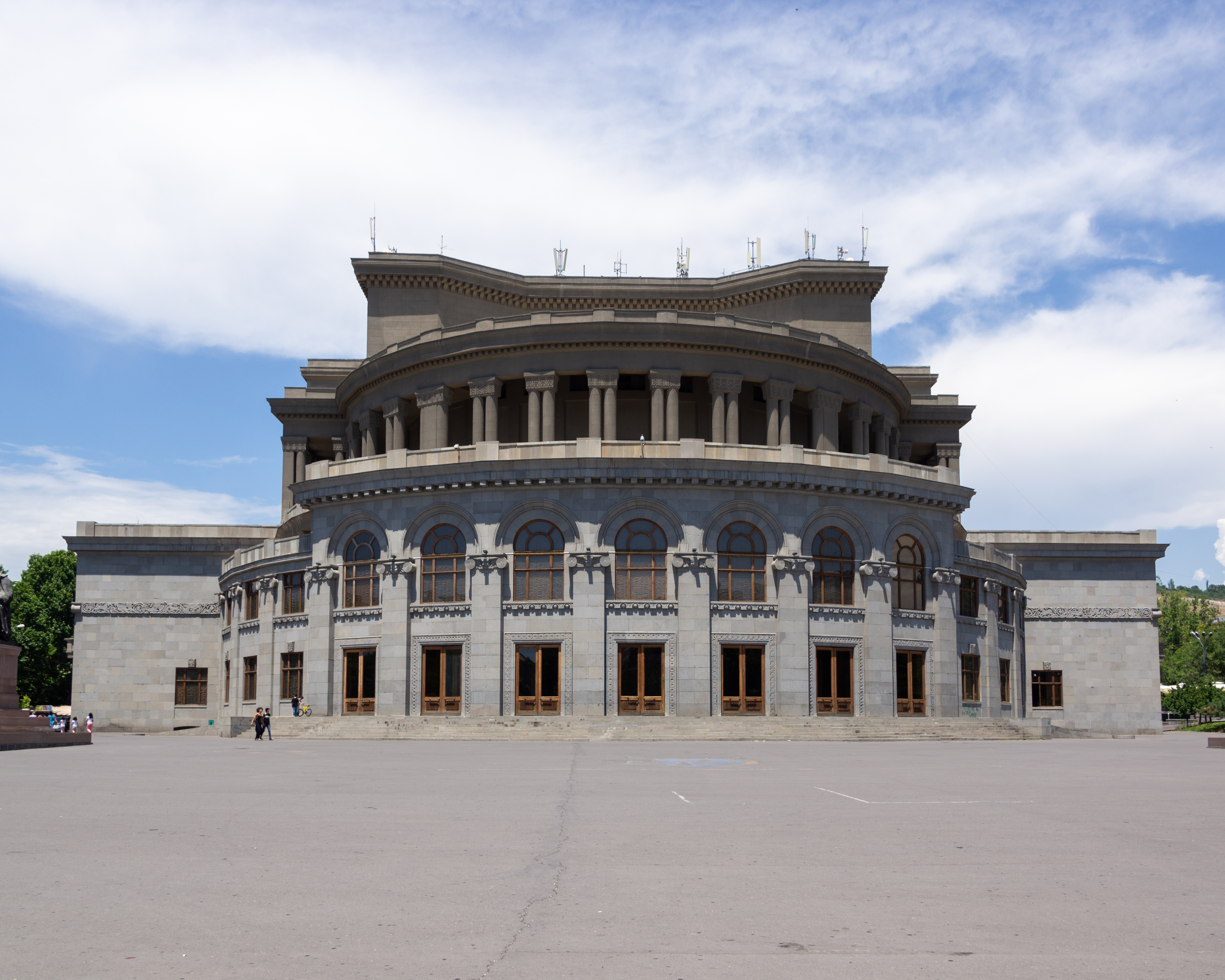
Freedom Square

- Republic Square
- Freedom Square
- Charles Aznavour Square
- Square of Russia
- Khachatur Abovyan Square

== Shengavit District ==
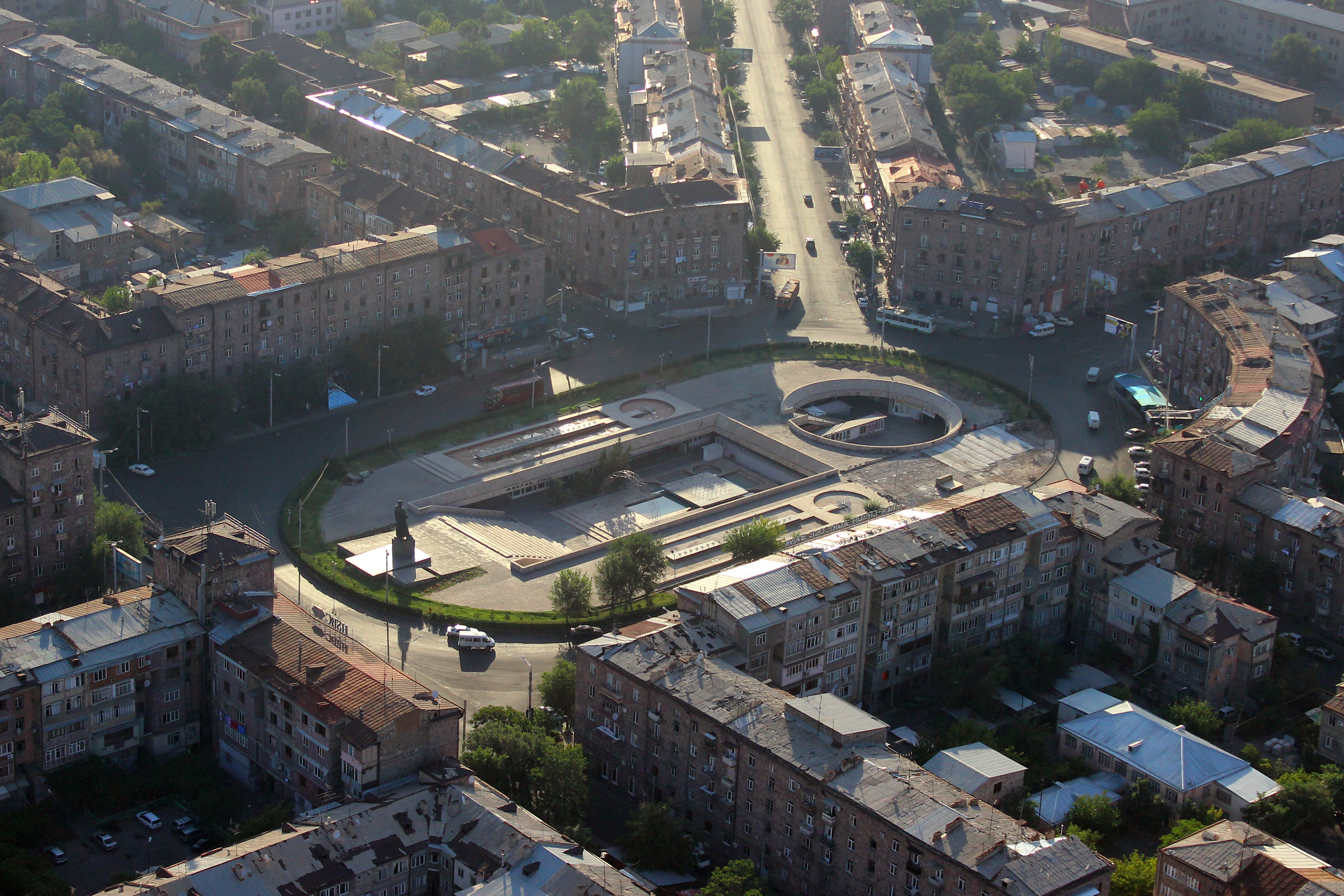
Garegin Nzhdeh Square

- Garegin Nzhdeh Square
