= Russian language in Armenia =

The Russian language began to play an important role in Armenia at the beginning of the 19th century, when Eastern Armenia (including the current territory of the Republic of Armenia) gradually became part of the Russian Empire.

In 1815, Count Ivan Lazarevich Lazarev founded the Lazarev Institute of Oriental Languages in Moscow, where Armenians and Russians began to study together, which contributed to the growth of interest in the Russian language among the Armenian population.

From 1828 to 1991 (except for the period of the First Republic of Armenia, 1918–1920), all official correspondence in Armenia was conducted in Russian, as it was the only administrative language in the region. At the beginning of the 20th century, only 3–4% of Armenians could write or speak Russian. The Russian language reached its peak in Armenia during the Soviet period; from the 1930s until the collapse of the USSR, instruction in it was mandatory in all educational institutions of the Armenian SSR.

In the 21st century, Russian remains the most popular foreign language in Armenia, despite the fact that its proficiency among the population has declined since Armenia gained independence in 1991. According to the Russian Ministry of Foreign Affairs, approximately 70% of the population of Armenia could communicate in Russian in 2010. According to a 2012 survey, 94% of Armenians have at least a basic level of proficiency in Russian: 24% have a high level of proficiency, 59% have an intermediate level of proficiency, and 11% have a basic level of proficiency.

== History ==
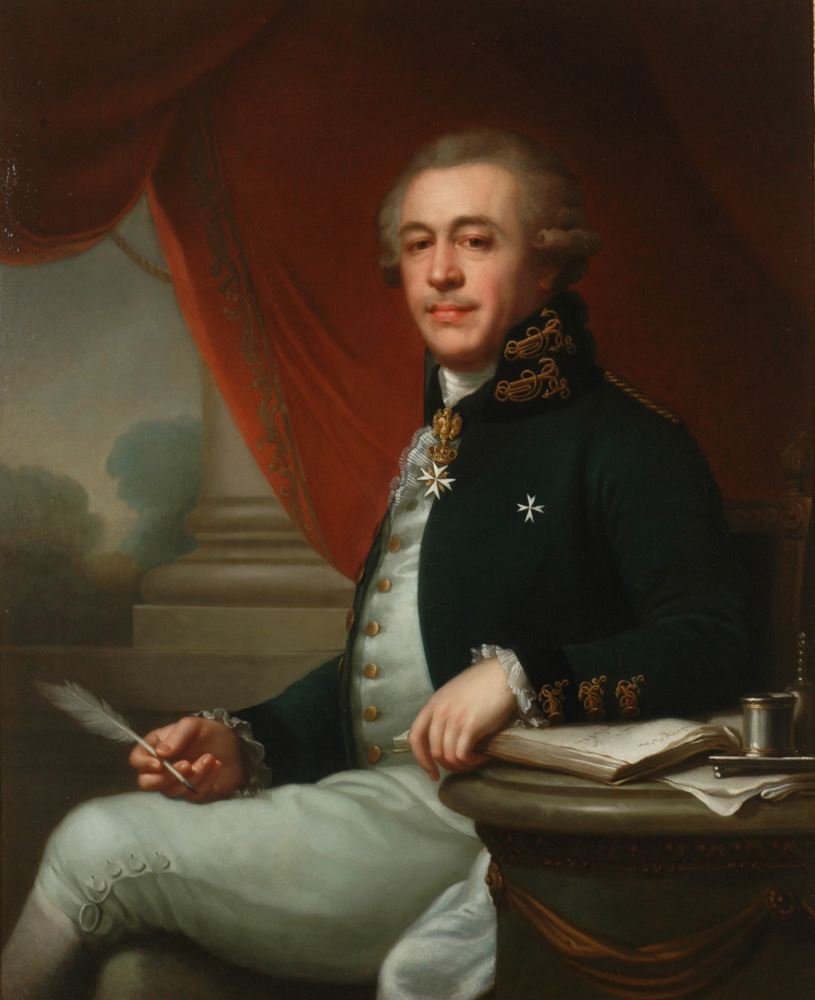
Count Ivan Lazarevich Lazarev (Hovhannes Lazarian), founder of the Lazarev Institute of Oriental Languages (1815).

In the 17th century, due to severe persecution by Turkish and Persian conquerors, Armenians were forced to resettle in Moscow and several other Russian cities. In the second half of the 17th century, this phenomenon began to acquire a mass character and influenced the rapprochement between historical Armenia and Russia, and the development of ties between the peoples. Armenian merchants, clergy, artisans, and early manufacturers moved to Russia. Among those who resettled were Lazar Nazarovich Lazarev (Agazar Lazaryan) and his four sons. Armenian circles understood the importance of spreading education among Armenian youth. Therefore, in his will, Ivan Lazarevich Lazarev, the son of Lazar Nazarovich, who died on October 24, 1801, ordered his brother, Ekim Lazarevich, to contribute 200 thousand rubles in banknotes to the Moscow Guardianship Council, so that the interest from this amount could be used to build a building where poor children from Armenian families could be educated and raised.

Thus, in 1815, the Lazarev Institute was established, which accepted children aged 10-14. Applicants were required to have basic knowledge of the fundamentals of the Law of God, reading, arithmetic and writing. The institute accepted 30-40 students that are a part of the Armenian Apostolic Church. Representatives of other nationalities were also allowed to study at this institute. The students of the institute, who were dependent on its founders, were required to work in Armenian schools in Russia after completing their studies, although this rule was not always observed. Graduates of the Lazarev Institute worked in Armenian schools in Tbilisi, Astrakhan, and Nakhichevan-on-Don.

After the signing of the Treaty of Turkmenchay, which ended the Russo-Persian War in 1828, and the final annexation of Eastern Armenia to the Russian Empire, the active introduction of Armenians to the Russian language and Russian culture began.

The Russian language reached the peak of its development in Armenia during the Soviet period. Since the 1930s, its teaching in Armenia has become mandatory from primary school to higher education institutions. In 1938, a department of Russian language and literature was opened at the Faculty of Philology of Yerevan State University, on the basis of which the Faculty of Russian Language and Literature was established in 1976. Significant contributions to the dissemination of the Russian language in Armenia were made by authors of educational and methodological literature - the founder of the first department of Russian language at Yerevan State University, Rafael Melkumyan, Professor Ararat Gharibyan and Honored Teacher Maria Karakeshishyan.

In 1937, the Russian-language Stanislavski Russian Theatre of Yerevan was opened.

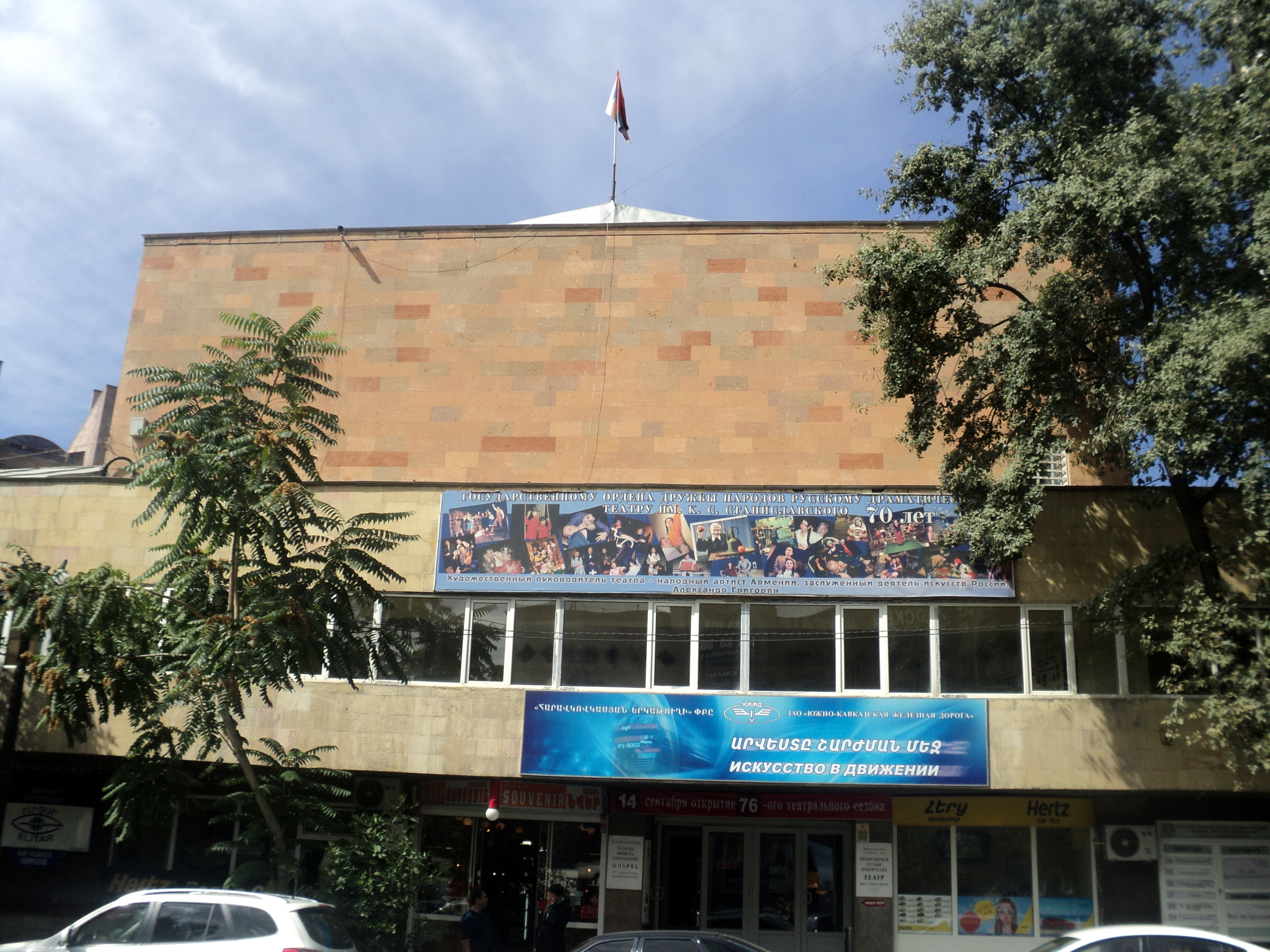
The Stanislavski Russian Theatre of Yerevan named after Konstantin Stanislavski, 2013.

By 1988, approximately 100,000 students attended Russian-language schools in Armenia. Russian served as a lingua franca and was the primary language of scientific research, although Armenian was the official language of the republic. During the Soviet era, approximately 30 different Russian-language magazines were published in Armenia, with an average circulation of 3,200 copies and 11 Russian-language newspapers, with an average circulation of 12,000 copies.

The situation changed dramatically after Armenia gained independence in 1991. Initially, Russian continued to be widely used in official matters, with Russian schools, vocational schools, and Russian-language departments operating. However, with the adoption of the Law on Language in 1993, Russian became a foreign language, and the education system and official matters were transferred to Armenian. Instruction in almost all educational institutions was now conducted in Armenian, even in Russian studies departments. Many qualified Russian-speaking specialists left for Russia. The overall number of Russian-speaking students also declined significantly.

According to the 2001 census, Russian was the native language of 29,563 people, of whom 14,728 were ethnic Armenians. Many refugees from Baku and other cities in Azerbaijan only speak Russian. According to a survey, 73% of respondents in 2006 and 75% in 2007 stated that knowledge of Russian was very important for their children.

In the 20 years since the collapse of the USSR, the number of residents of Armenia who were fluent in Russian has decreased by 1.6 times. According to the 1989 All-Union Population Census and the 2001 and 2011 Armenian censuses, while in 1989 there were 66.7 thousand people in Armenia who spoke Russian as their native language, in 2001 there were already 19 thousand, and in 2011 – 10 thousand people. In 1989, about 1.4 million people named Russian as their second language, in 2001 – about 1.1 million people, in 2011 – about 900 thousand people. The number of people who did not speak it or spoke it poorly was: 1.8 million people in 1989, 2 million people in 2001, 2.7 million people in 2011.

== Modern day ==
As of 2010, there were 36 schools in Armenia with classes taught in Russian. Of these, 16 were located in Yerevan. These classes were only open to children from ethnic Russian families or children from mixed marriages. The Moscow government provided educational materials for these schools. Some subjects in these classes were also taught in Armenian. According to some sources, the total number of students in Russian-language classes was 1,450.

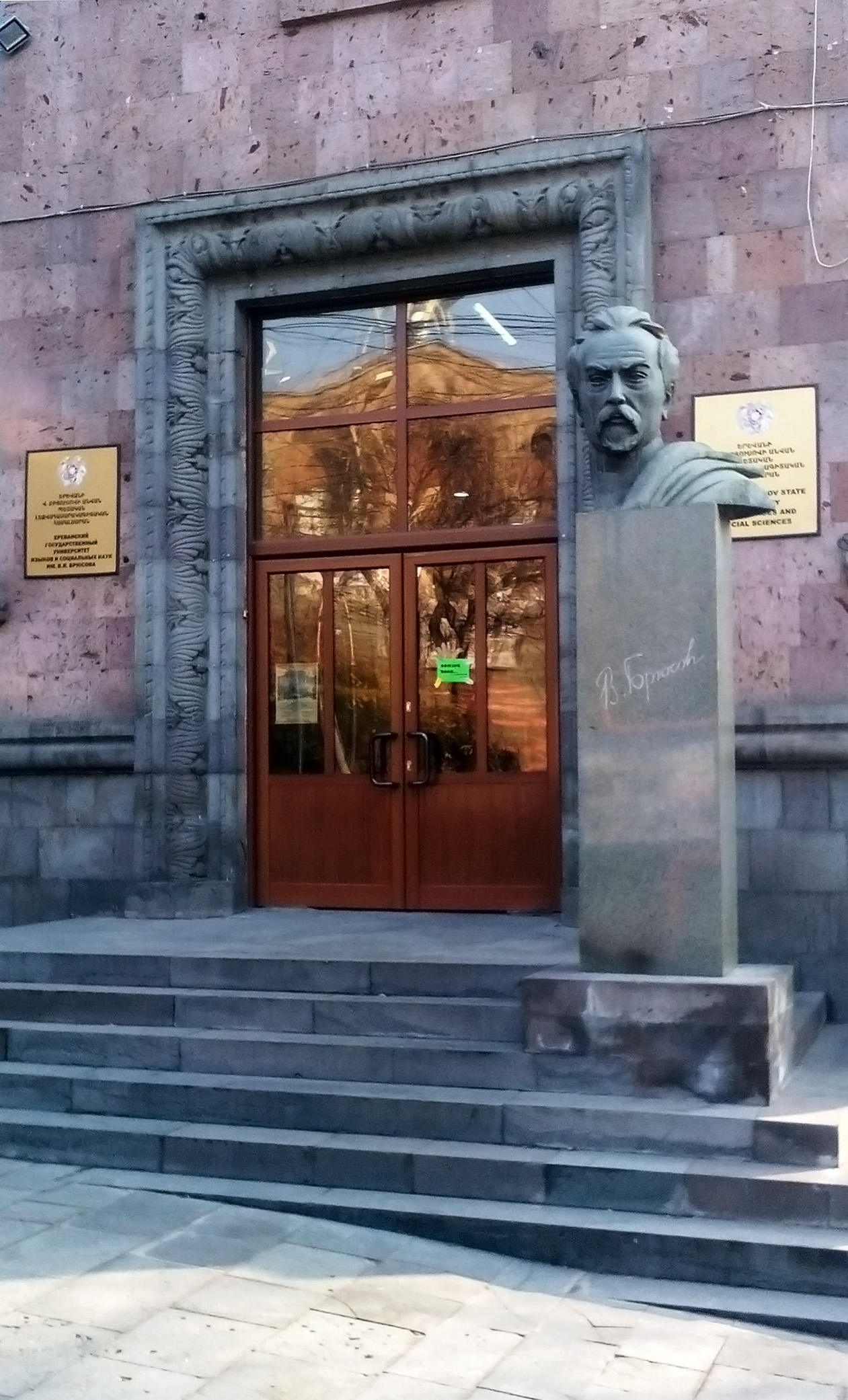
Entrance to the Yerevan Brusov State University of Languages and Social Sciences, monument to Valery Bryusov, 2015.

Instruction in Russian is conducted at the Slavic Gymnasium for children of military personnel and at the Basic Lyceum of the Yerevan Brusov State University of Languages and Social Sciences named after Valery Bryusov. In 2009, a private school with instruction in Russian, "Usmunk," was opened at the Russian-Armenian University. Initially, it only offered elementary grades, but in the 2012-2013 academic years, it was planned to become a full-fledged secondary school.

In the 2011-2012 academic year, the number of students studying in Russian, taking into account partial instruction of subjects in Armenian, amounted to 4.6 thousand people. In elementary grades, textbooks developed in Armenia, which are published every four years with funds from the World Bank, are used to study Russian as a native language, as well as as an academic subject, and Russian literature. For elementary grades, the textbook by L. A. Baybatryan is used, for middle grades - by N. K. Arakelyan, for high school - by R. A. Ter-Arakelyan.

There are schools with in-depth study of the Russian language. As of 2012, there were approximately 70 of them, half of which were located in Yerevan. 370,000 Armenian schoolchildren studied Russian as a foreign language.

Higher education in Russian can be obtained at the Yerevan State Linguistic University named after V. Ya. Bryusov, Yerevan State University and the Armenian State Pedagogical University named after Khachatur Abovian. 2,000 people receive education in Russian at these universities.

In 2010, the Association of Teachers of Russian Language and Literature in General Education Schools of Armenia was established in the Republic of Armenia, which included about 2,500 people.

You can get an education in Russian in the educational departments of Russian universities: branches of the Moscow State University of Economics, Statistics, and Informatics, the Moscow New Law Institute, the St. Petersburg Institute of Foreign Economic Relations, Economics and Law, the Armenian Institute of Tourism, and the Yerevan branch of the Modern University for the Humanities.

According to the 2011 census, Russian was the first language of 23,484 people, or 0.8% of Armenian citizens, of whom 11,859 were Armenian and 10,472 were Russian. In addition, 52.7% of Armenian citizens, or 1,591,246 people, considered Russian their second language.

As of 2012, the Russian-language press consisted of eight publications: Novoye Vremya, Golos Armenii, Respublika Armenii, Sobesednik Armenii, Tretya Sila+, Delovoye Express, Russkiy Yazyk v Armenii, and Bazis. These newspapers are published 2-3 times a week with a small circulation, averaging 3,000 copies.

Programs from the Russian television channels Russia-K, Channel One, and RTR-Planeta are broadcast in the Republic of Armenia. Programs from the interstate television and radio company Mir are also broadcast. The national radio and television schedule includes daily short news bulletins in Russian on Armenian television channels. Every Monday, a half-hour program, "Armenia is Our Home," is broadcast. Feature films and popular science films in Russian are occasionally shown.

=== Artsakh ===
In September 2008, a school with instruction in Russian opened in Stepanakert, a city in Nagorno-Karabakh, with more than 30 students studying there.

The only educational institution in the Republic of Artsakh that offered a professional education in Russian was the Stepanakert branch of the Yerevan division of the Russian-Armenian Modern Humanitarian Institute (RASGI). The student body numbered over 100 students by 2012.

There are some vocabulary differences to the variety of Russian as spoken in Armenia/Artsakh, such as:

English	Artsakhi Russian	Standard Russian
clothespin	шпилька	прищепка
water fountain	пулпулак	питьевой фонтан
sweatpants	финки	треники, тренировочные штаны

=== Organizations and projects supporting the Russian language ===
Rossotrudnichestvo and the Russkiy Mir Foundation are implementing Russian language support programs in Armenia. The Russian Center for Science and Culture (RCSC, a representative office of Rossotrudnichestvo) operates the Russian Educational and Methodological Center for the Russian Language, which organizes and delivers courses across 14 programs designed for various age groups. Approximately 12,000 students participate in these courses annually.

From 2011 to 2015, the federal target program "Russian Language" was in effect in Armenia. The essence of the program was that each year, schools with Russian-language classes were provided with textbooks, manuals, and anthologies on Russian language and literature free of charge.

In 2013, the CIS Youth Union launched a project to open free Russian language training centers. Armenia was the first republic to open these courses. The project was called the "Free Russian Language Training Center" and was led by Luiza Gumroyan.
