= GHY =

GHY or Ghy may refer to:

- Gibbons-Hawking-York boundary term, a mathematical expression in general relativity for space-times with boundary
- Grand Hotel Yerevan, a hotel in Yerevan, Armenia
- German Sky Airlines, a defunct airline from Germany, by ICAO code; see List of defunct airlines of Germany
- Guwahati railway station, a train station in Guwahati, Assam, India
- Glen Huntly railway station, a train station in Glen Huntly, Victoria, Australia
- Grokhovskyite, a mineral; see List of mineral codes
