= Charles Aznavour Square, Gyumri =

Coordinates: 40°48′24″N 43°50′53″E

Charles Aznavour Square
- Շառլ Ազնավուրի Հրապարակ (Armenian)
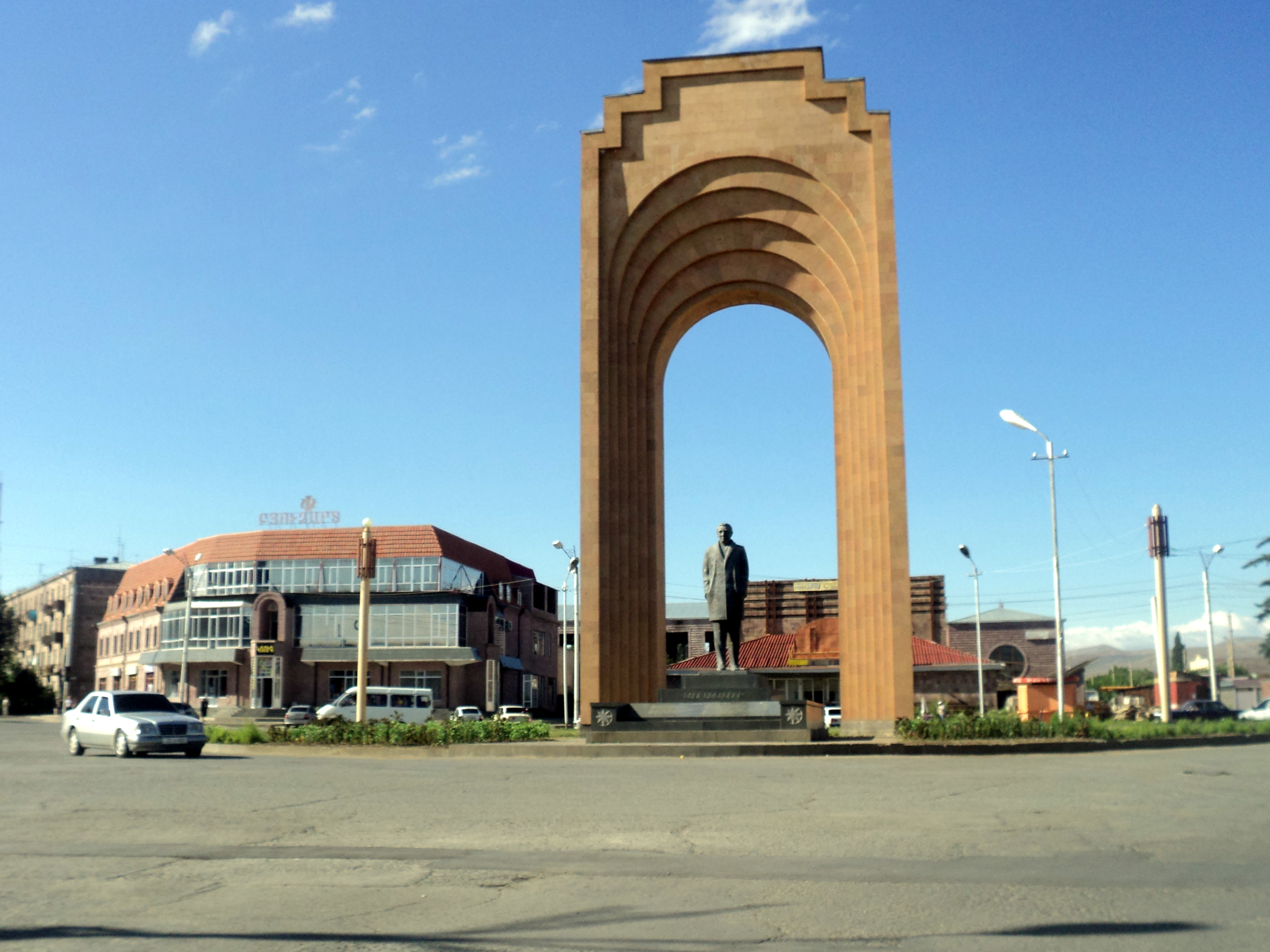
- The statue of the Charles Aznavour at the centre of the square
- Interactive map of Charles Aznavour Square
- Location: Gyumri, Armenia

History
- Built: 2000 (restored)

Site notes
- Area: 9,200 m^{2} (99,000 sq ft)
- Governing body: Gyumri City Council

Charles Aznavour Square (Armenian: Շառլ Ազնավուրի Հրապարակ) is a large square at the northern part of Gyumri city, Armenia. It is considered the 3rd square of the city after the Vardanants Square and the Independence Square.

The square is intersected by the following streets:

- Vazgen Sargsyan street from the northwest.
- Missak Manouchian street from the northeast.
- Khanjyan street from the east.
- Garegin Nzhdeh street from the south.
- Ilya Repin street from the west.

The rectangular-shaped square (115 by 80 meters) was restored in 2000 and the statue of the renowned French-Armenian singer Charles Aznavour was erected. The sculptor of the statue was Samvel Petrosyan.

The square is surrounded with many commercial and residential buildings.

== See also ==
- Charles Aznavour Square, Yerevan
