= Square of Russia =

- Ռուսաստանի հրապարակ (Armenian)
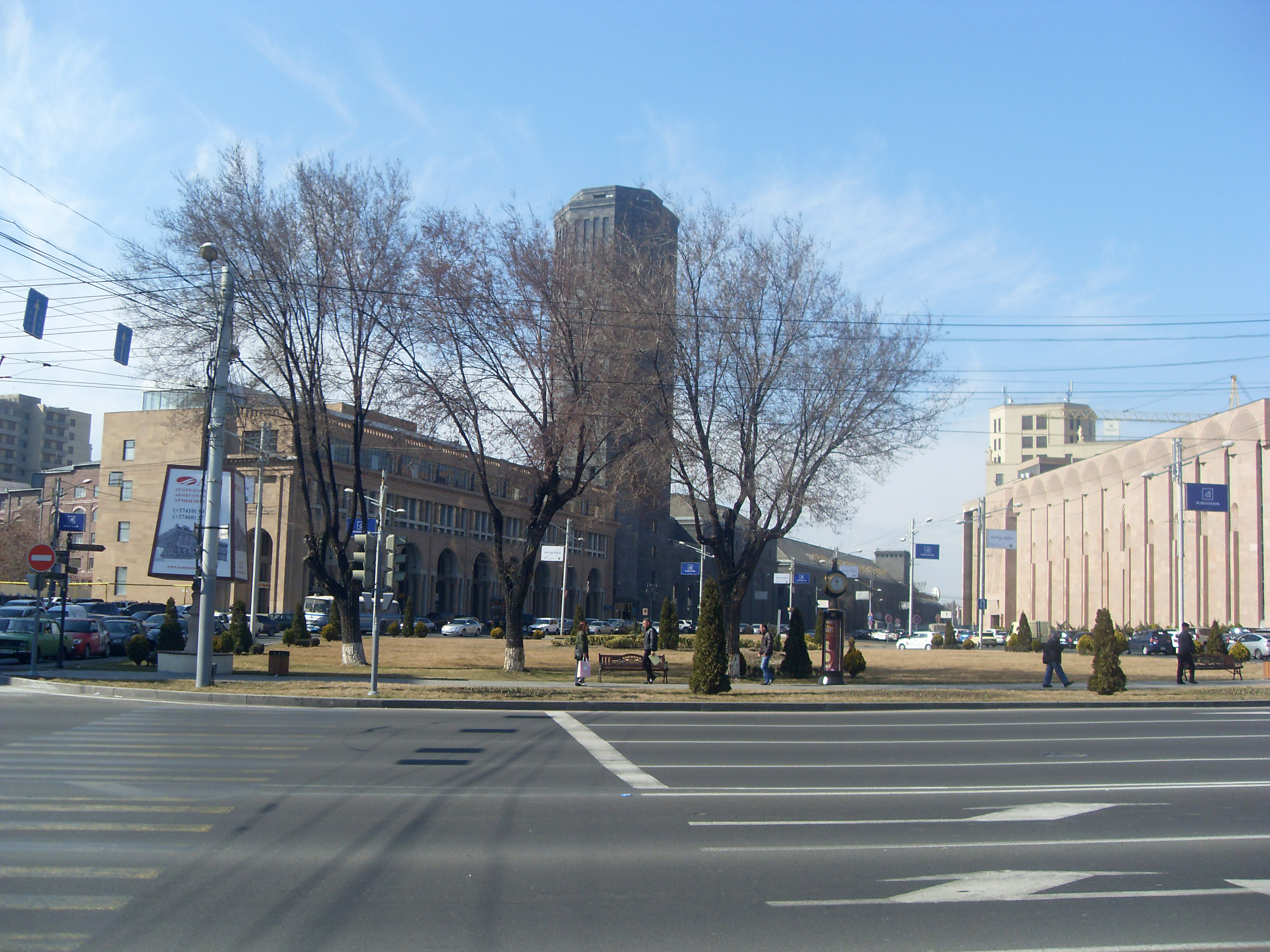
- Interactive map of Square of Russia
- Location: Yerevan, Armenia

History
- Built: October 21, 2008

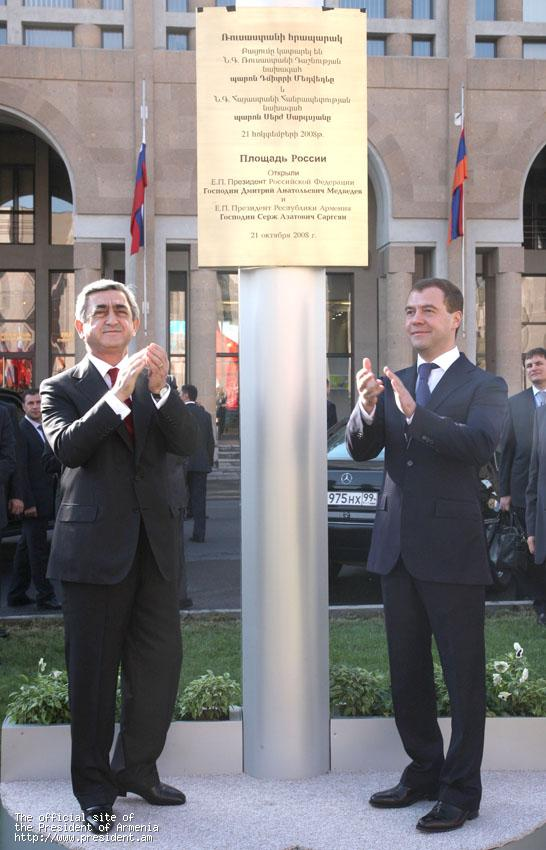
Dmitry Medvedev with Serzh Sargsyan at the square.

The Square of Russia (also known as Russian Square or Russia Square) is a square in Yerevan, Armenia. It is located in Grigori Lusavorich and Argishti Streets. Armenian President Serzh Sargsyan and Russian President Dmitry Medvedev took part in the opening ceremony. It is located near Alexander Myasnikyan square. The City Hall and the House of Moscow are located the square.

In the immediate vicinity of the square is also the Embassy of Russia in Armenia. In November 2022, during the visit of Vladimir Putin to Yerevan, demonstration on Russia Square protesting the 2022 Russian Invasion of Ukraine and the lack of intervention of the CSTO in the September 2022 Armenia–Azerbaijan clashes took place.

== See also ==
- List of squares in Yerevan
