= Stanislavski Russian Theatre of Yerevan =

Coordinates: 40°10′55″N 44°31′00″E

State Russian Drama Theatre named after Konstantin Stanislavski
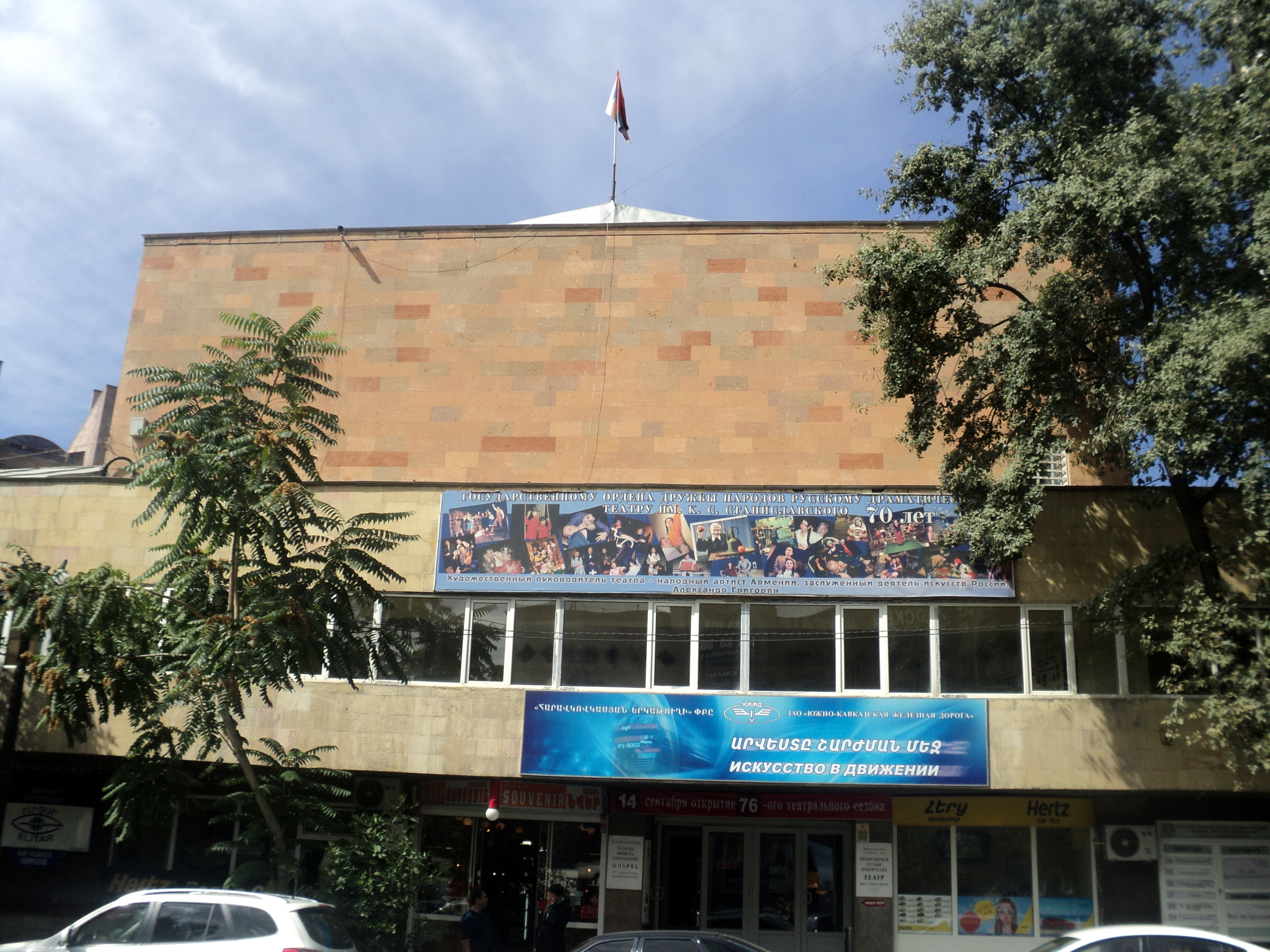
- Interactive map of State Russian Drama Theatre named after Konstantin Stanislavski
- Address: Abovyan Street 7 Yerevan; Armenia
- Owner: Government of Armenia
- Operator: Alexander Grigoryan
- Capacity: 514
- Type: drama theatre

Construction
- Opened: 1937

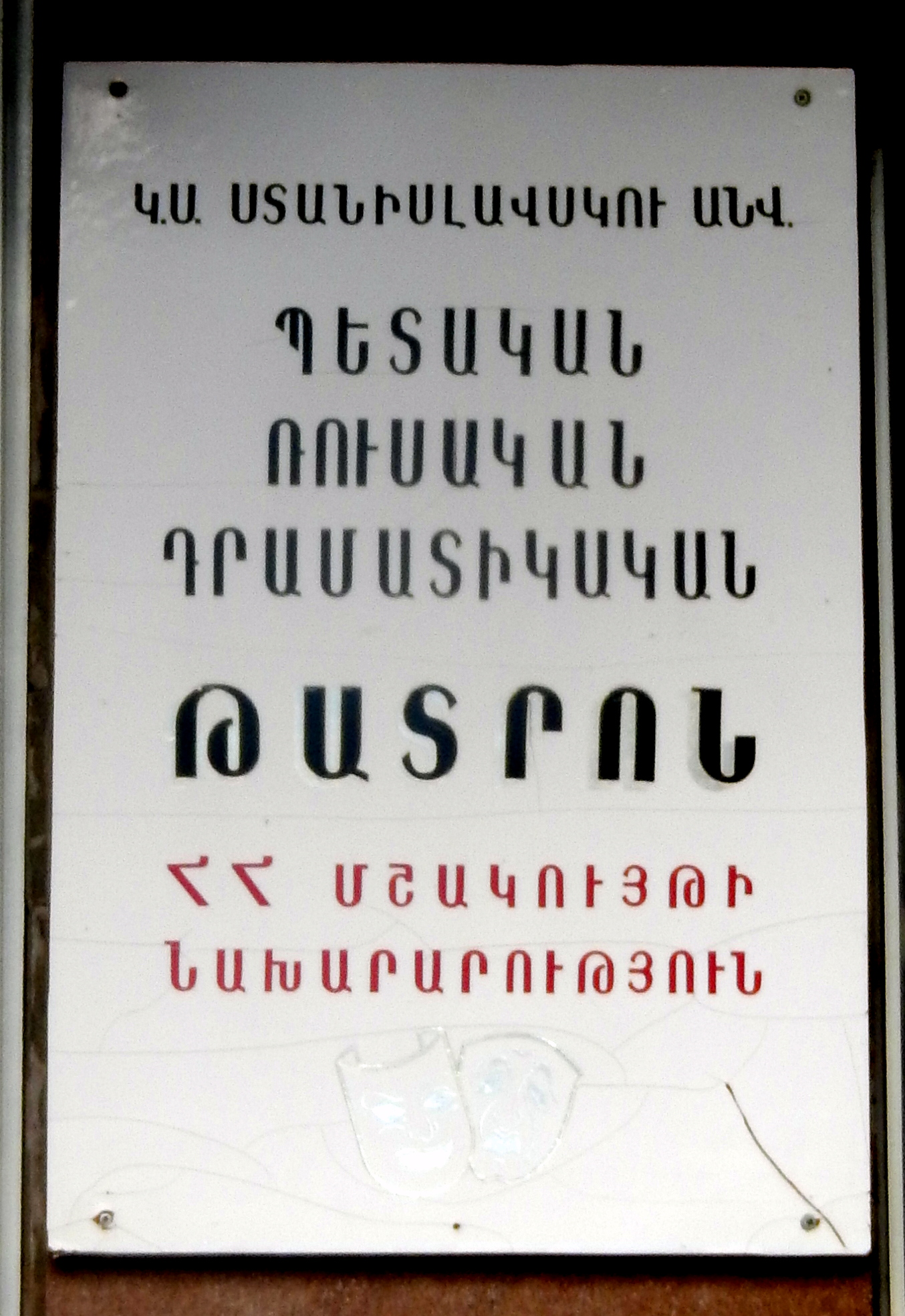

Officially State Russian Drama Theatre named after Konstantin Stanislavski (Armenian: Կոնստանտին Ստանիսլավսկու անվան ռուսական պետական դրամատիկական թատրոն), more commonly Stanislavski Russian Theatre, is a state theatre in the Armenian capital of Yerevan located on Abovyan Street in the central Kentron district of the city, next to Charles Aznavour Square. It was opened in 1937 and named after the Russian actor and theatre director Constantin Stanislavski since 1938. The theatre director is Alexander Grigoryan since 1965.

The shows of the theatre are mainly from the Russian works of art and literature with some shows of Armenian classical writers. There are also afternoon shows for children at the weekends.

The Stanislavski theatre is constructed on the place of a demolished Russian church.
