= Grand Hotel Yerevan =

Hotel in Yerevan, Armenia

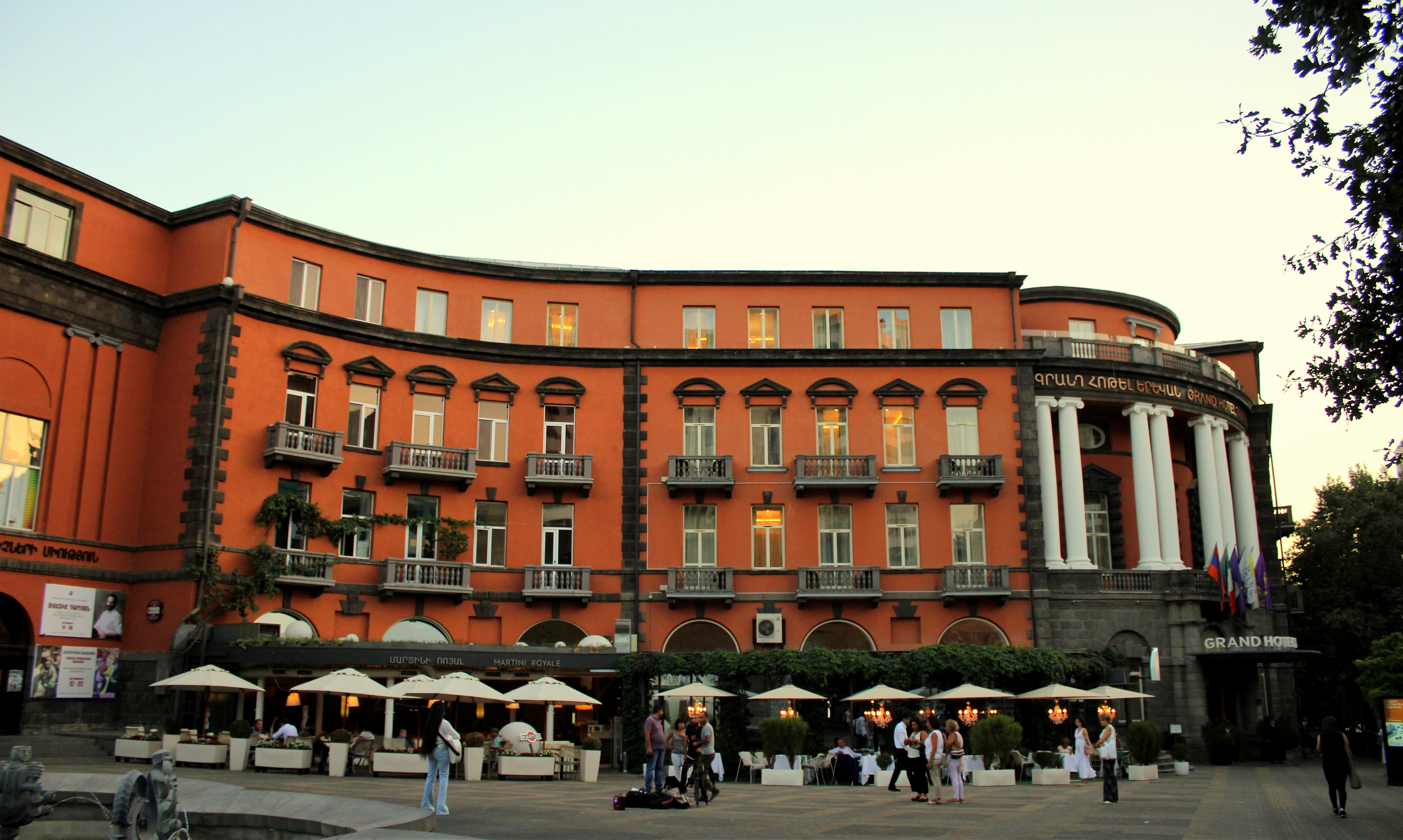

- Location within Armenia

General information
- Location: Yerevan, Armenia
- Coordinates: 40°10′53″N 44°30′59″E
- Opening: 1926
- Owner: Renco S.p.A.
- Operator: Small Luxury Hotels of the World

Technical details
- Floor count: 4

Design and construction
- Architect: Nikolai Buniatian

Other information
- Number of rooms: 104
- Number of restaurants: 4

Website
- Official website

Grand Hotel Yerevan (Armenian: Գրանդ Հոթել Երևան), also known as GHY, is a 5-star hotel in the central Kentron District of Yerevan, the capital of Armenia. It was opened in 1926 during the Soviet period as a state-owned enterprise. It is one of the oldest hotels in modern Armenia, and the oldest functioning hotel in Yerevan.

The hotel is located at 14 Abovyan Street, overlooking Charles Aznavour Square and next to the Artists' Union of Armenia.

== History ==
The hotel was opened in 1926 as a state-owned hotel of the Armenian SSR, based on the design of architect Nikolai Buniatian. It was known as the "Intourist Hotel", named after the Intourist agency, which was the regulating body of the hotels and tourism within the Soviet Union. It was the first hotel opened in Soviet Armenia.

During the 1930s, the hotel became the regular meeting place of the intellectuals of the city including Yeghishe Charents, Yervand Kochar and Vahram Papazian.

In 1959, the Intourist agency was transferred to the newly opened Armenia Hotel at the Republic Square, and the Intourist Hotel came to be known as the "Yerevan Hotel".

After the collapse of the USSR, Yerevan Hotel was acquired by the Italian company Renco S.p.A., and after a major renovation it was reopened as the 4-star "Golden Tulip Hotel Yerevan" in 1999, operated by the Groupe du Louvre. In 2009, following a major renovation, the structure was upgraded to a 5-star hotel to become known as the Royal Tulip Grand Hotel Yerevan until the end of 2016.

Small Luxury Hotels of the World took over management in 2017.

== Gallery ==
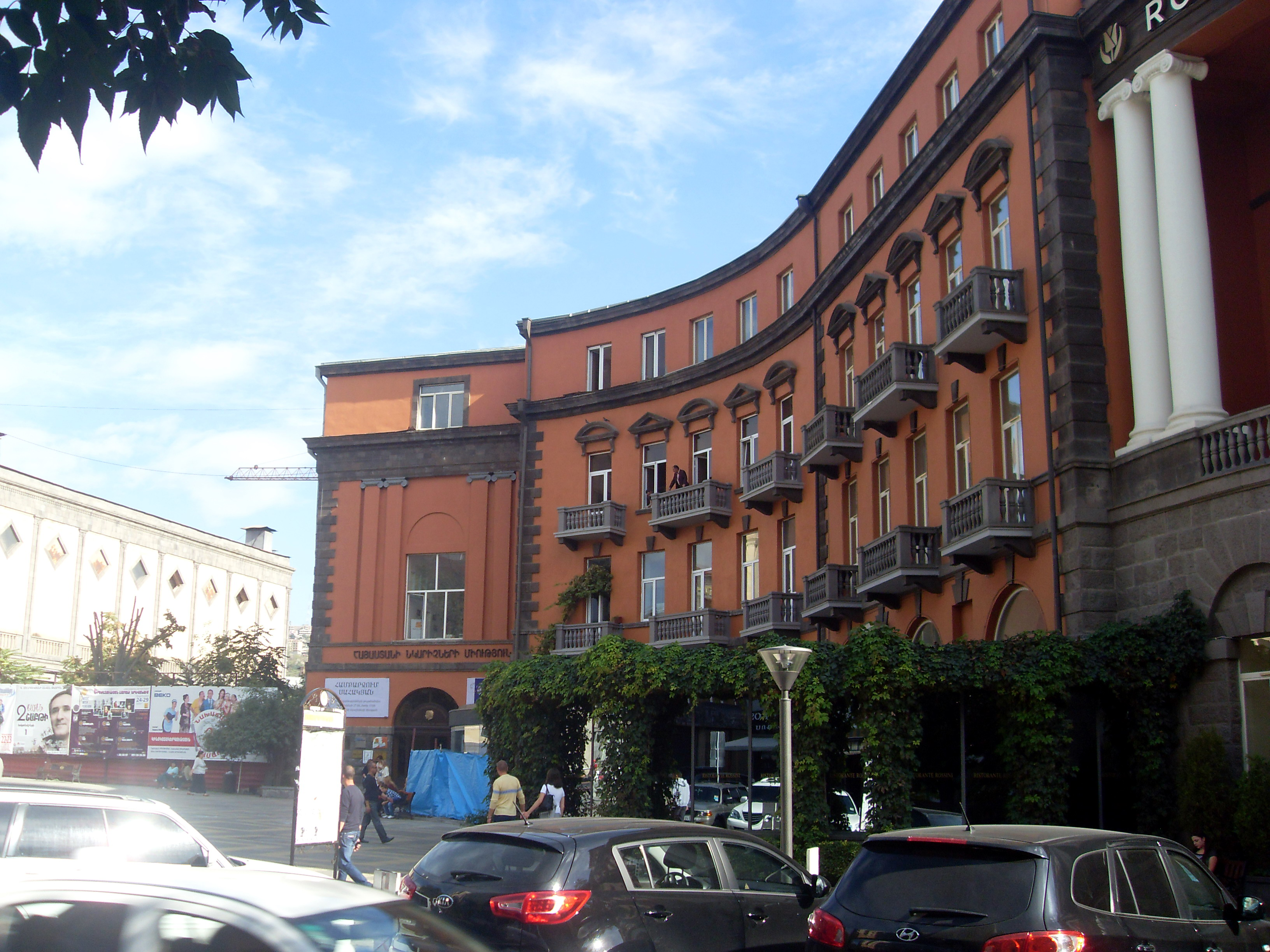
The view of the hotel overlooking the Aznavour square

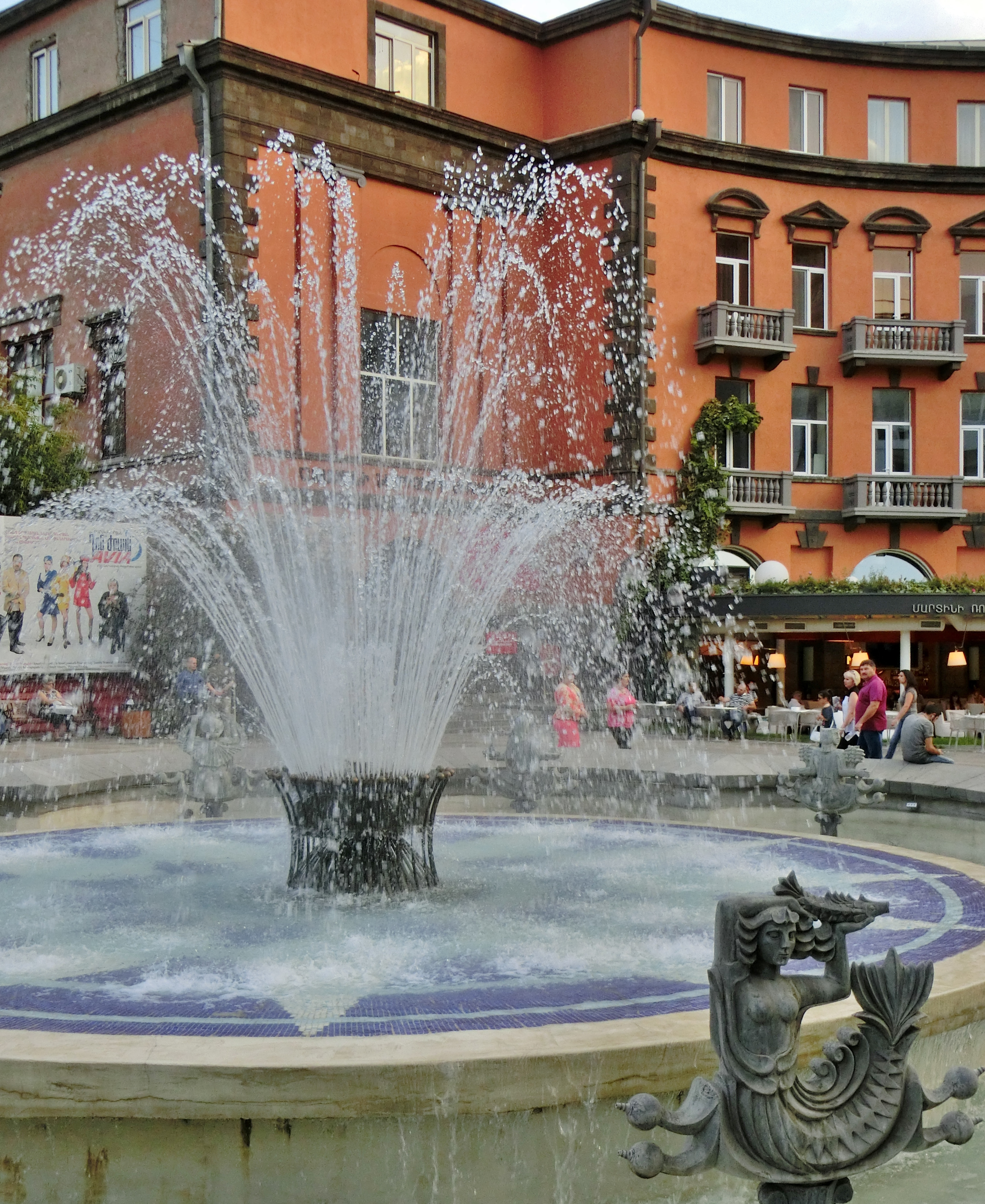
Fountains at Aznavour square

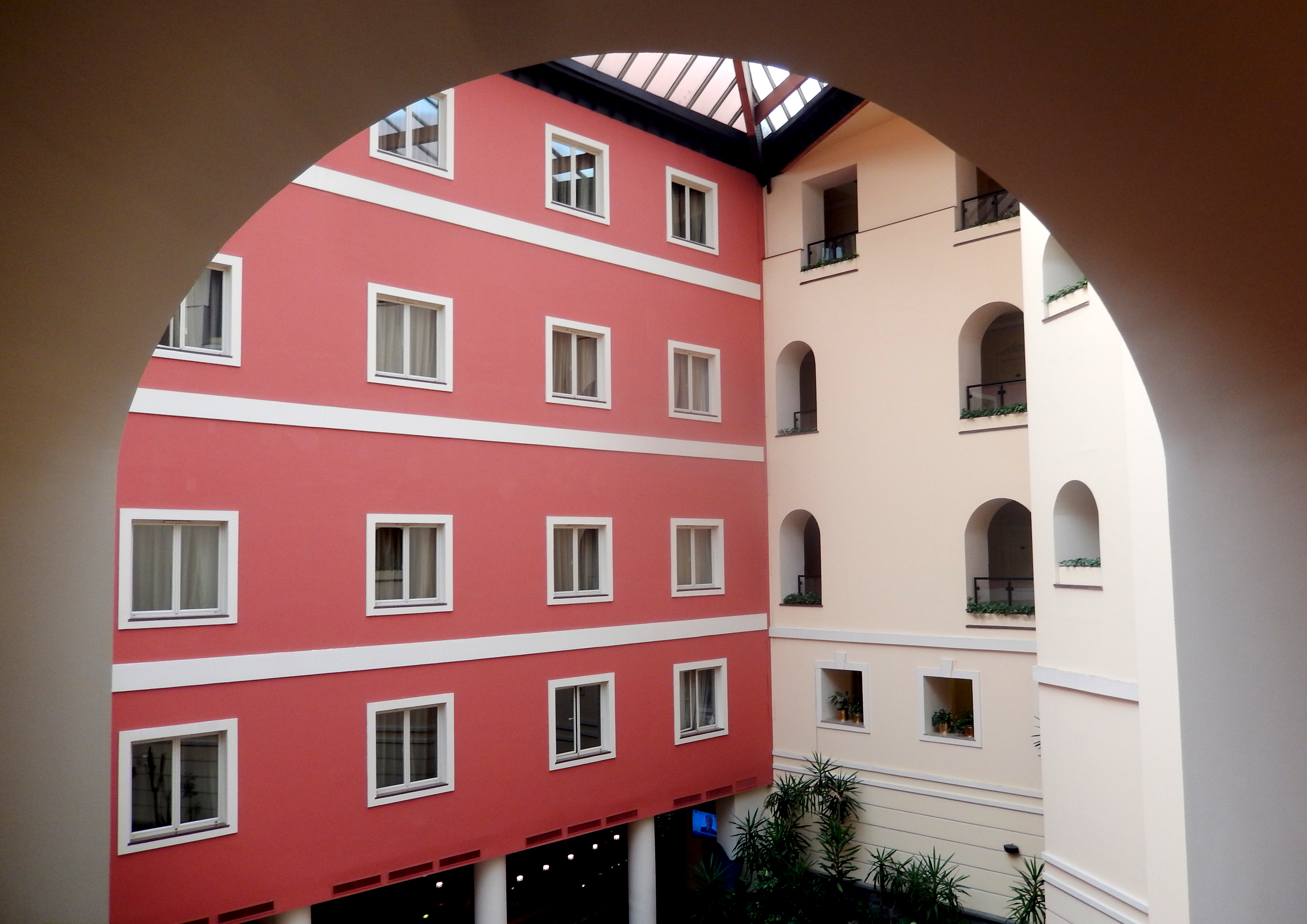
Interior view

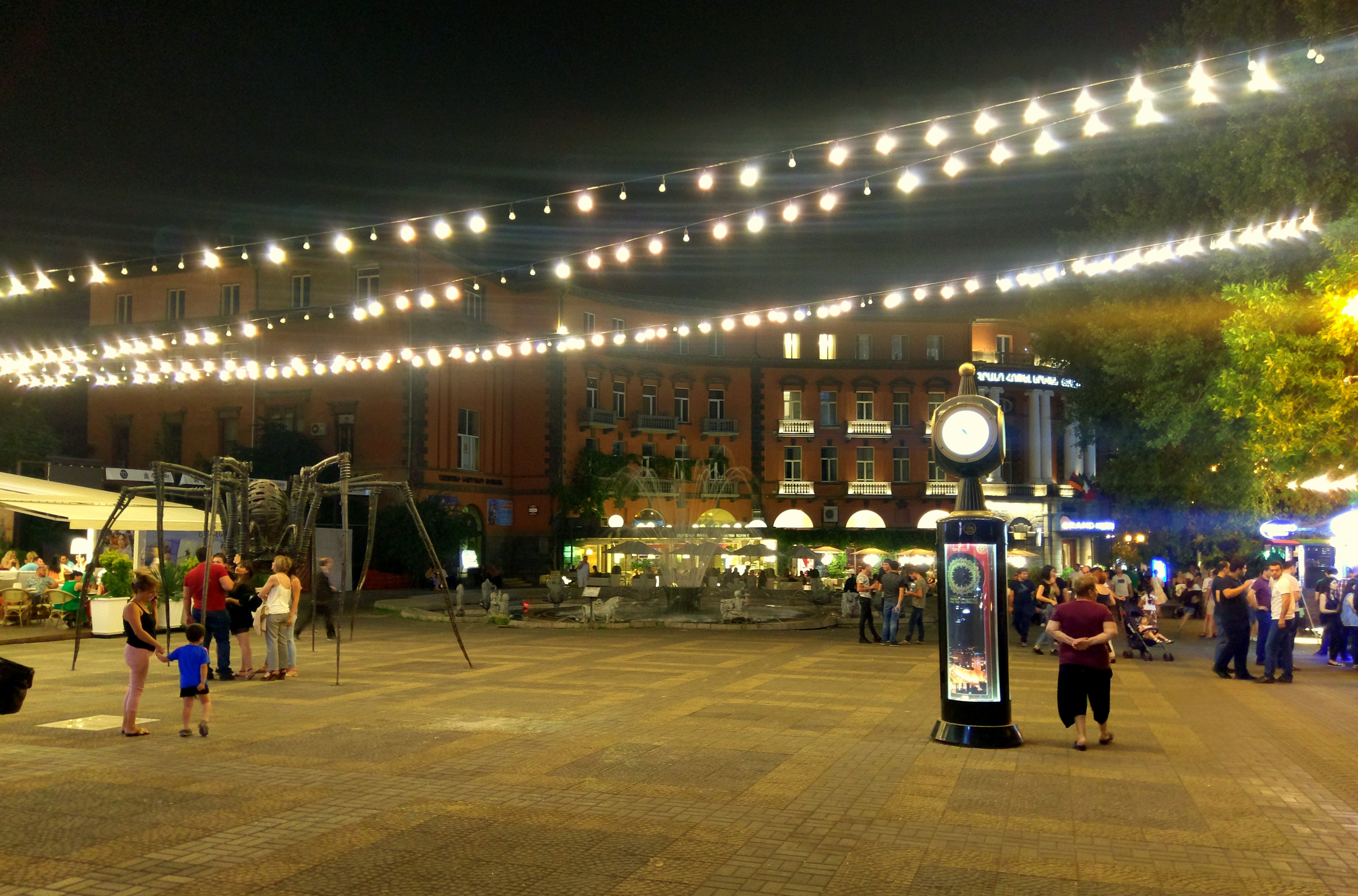
The hotel at night
