= Charles Aznavour Square, Yerevan =

Square in Yerevan, Armenia

Coordinates: 40°10′54.48″N 44°31′1.92″E

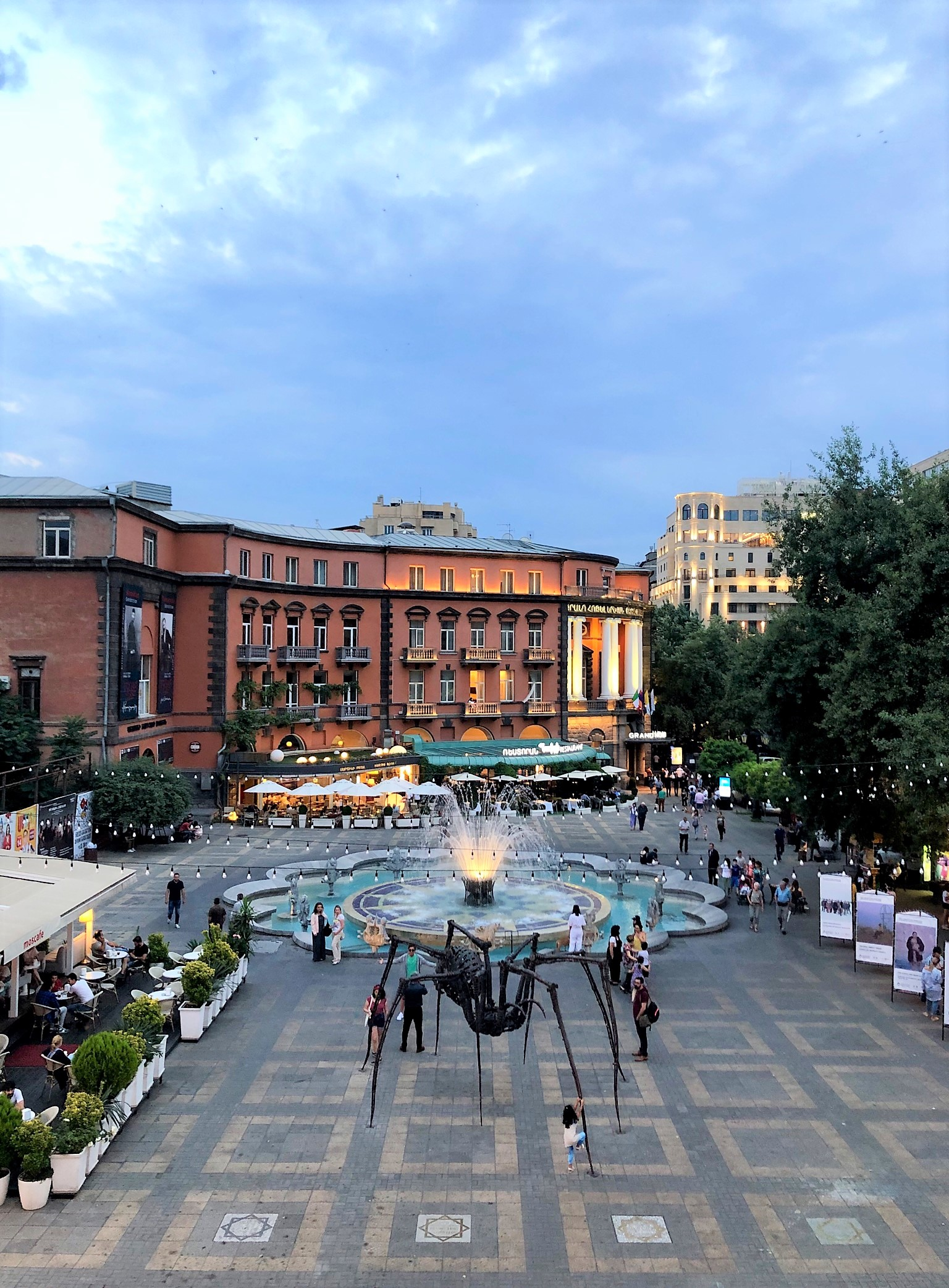

Charles Aznavour Square (in Armenian Շառլ Ազնավուրի հրապարակ) is a small square in the Kentron District of the Armenian capital Yerevan. The square is named in honour of the French Armenian singer Charles Aznavour as part of the celebrations of the 10th anniversary of Armenian independence in 2001. The square adjacent to Abovyan Street includes a number of important venues including Stanislavski Russian Theatre of Yerevan, the Moscow Cinema, the Artists' Union of Armenia offices. Grand Hotel Yerevan on Abovyan Street also overlooks the square. The square also hosted the Yerevan Vernissage before the latter moved to its present location.

== See also ==
- List of squares in Yerevan
- Charles Aznavour Square, Gyumri
