= Abovyan, Ararat =

Abovyan Աբովյան
- Location within Armenia Location within Ararat
- Coordinates: 40°02′56″N 44°32′51″E
- Country: Armenia
- Province: Ararat
- Municipality: Artashat
- Founded: 1830

Population (2011)
  - Total: 1,402
- Time zone: UTC+4 (AMT)
  - Summer (DST): UTC+5

Abovyan (Armenian: Աբովյան) is a village in the Artashat Municipality of the Ararat Province of Armenia. It is named in honour of the writer Khachatur Abovyan.
