= Independence Square, Gyumri =

Coordinates: 40°47′33″N 43°50′49″E

Independence Square
- Անկախության Հրապարակ (Armenian)
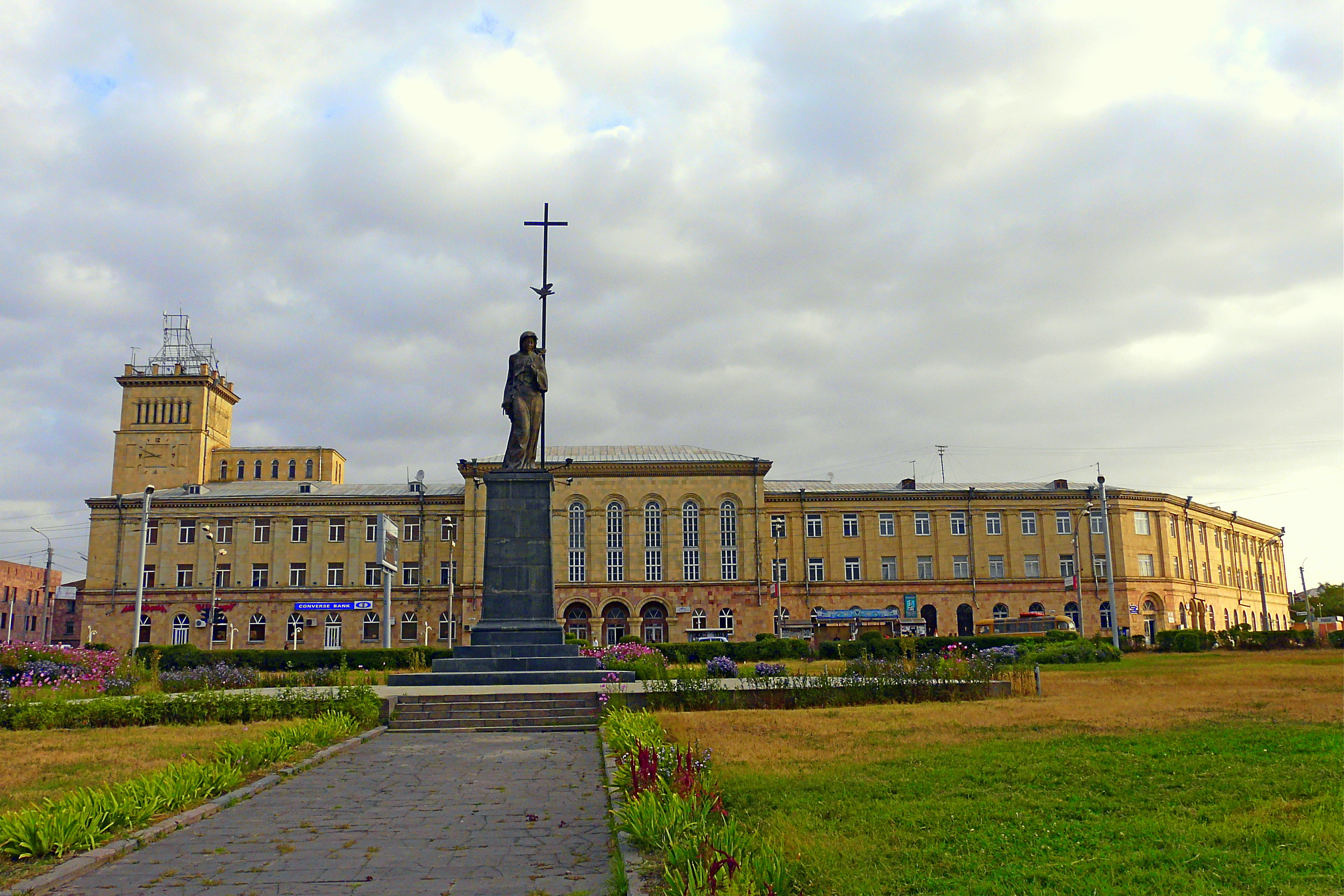
- The statue of the "Armenian Girl" at the centre of the Independence Square with the former textile factory in the background
- Interactive map of Independence Square
- Location: Gyumri, Armenia

History
- Built: 1940s (completed)

Site notes
- Area: 15,625 m^{2} (168,190 sq ft)
- Architectural style: Neoclassical
- Governing body: Gyumri City Council

Independence Square (Armenian: Անկախության Հրապարակ Ankakhutyan Hraparak) is a large square at the centre of Gyumri city, Armenia. It is the second square of the city after the central Vartanants Square. The square is intersected by the streets of Khrimian Hayrik, Garegin Nzhdeh, Alex Manoogian, Sayat Nova Avenue and Tigranes the Great Avenue. It has a shape of square (125 by 125 meters) and was completed during the 1940s, after World War II.

The Independence Square of Gyumri was known as the Lenin square during the Soviet years. It was severely damaged during the 1988 earthquake. With the independence of Armenia in 1991, the square was renamed with its current name.

The independence square is mainly occupied by a large green park, centred with the statue of the Armenian Girl raising a cross, commemorating the victims of the 1988 Armenian earthquake.

== Buildings around the square ==
- The former Gyumri Textile Factory building, occupying the northern side.
- Gyumri Courthouse on the northwestern corner.
- Gyumri Academy of Fine Arts on the western side.
- Gyumri Information Technology Center on the southern side.
- Progress University on the eastern side.

== Gallery ==
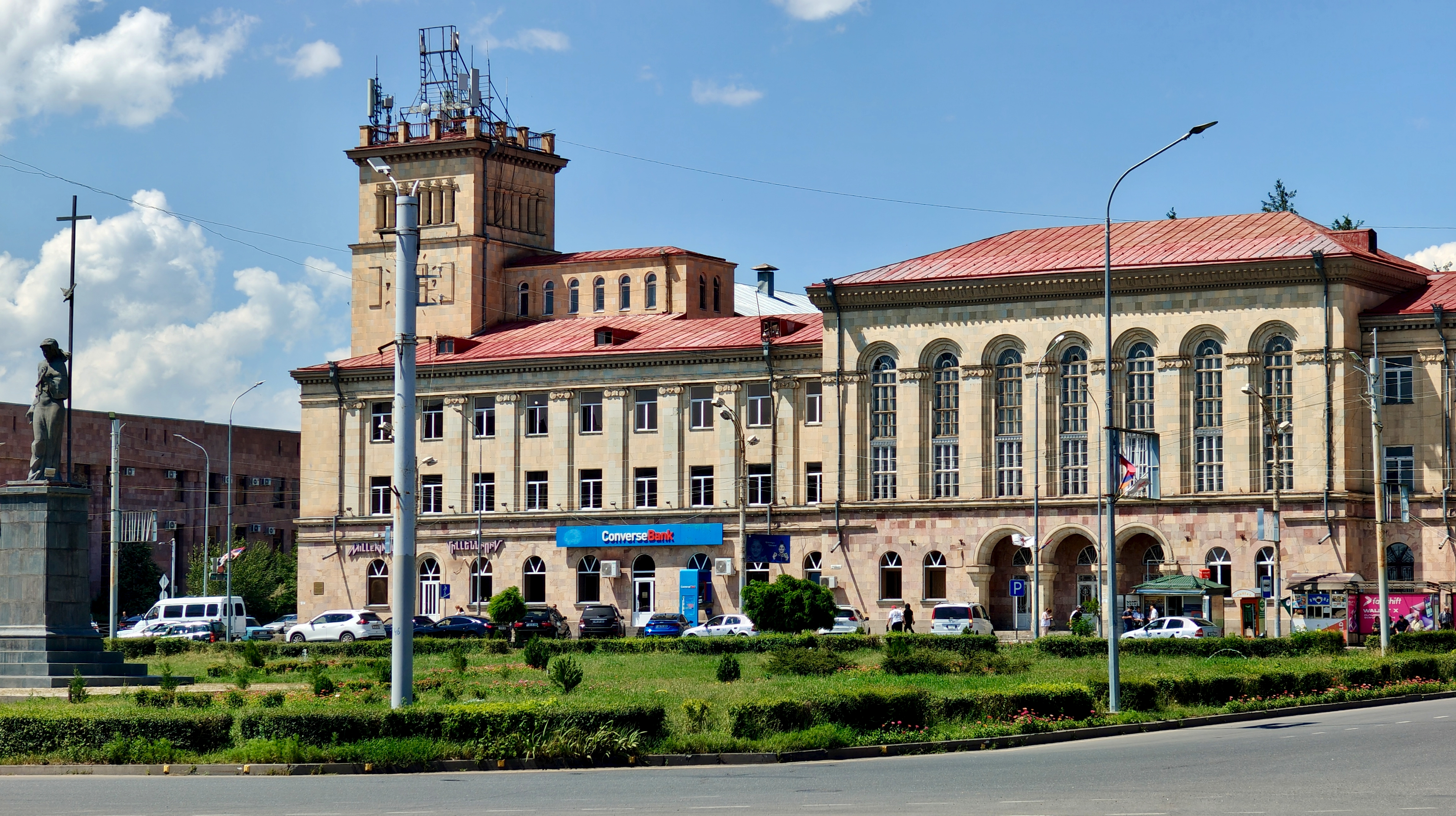
Independence Square in 2025

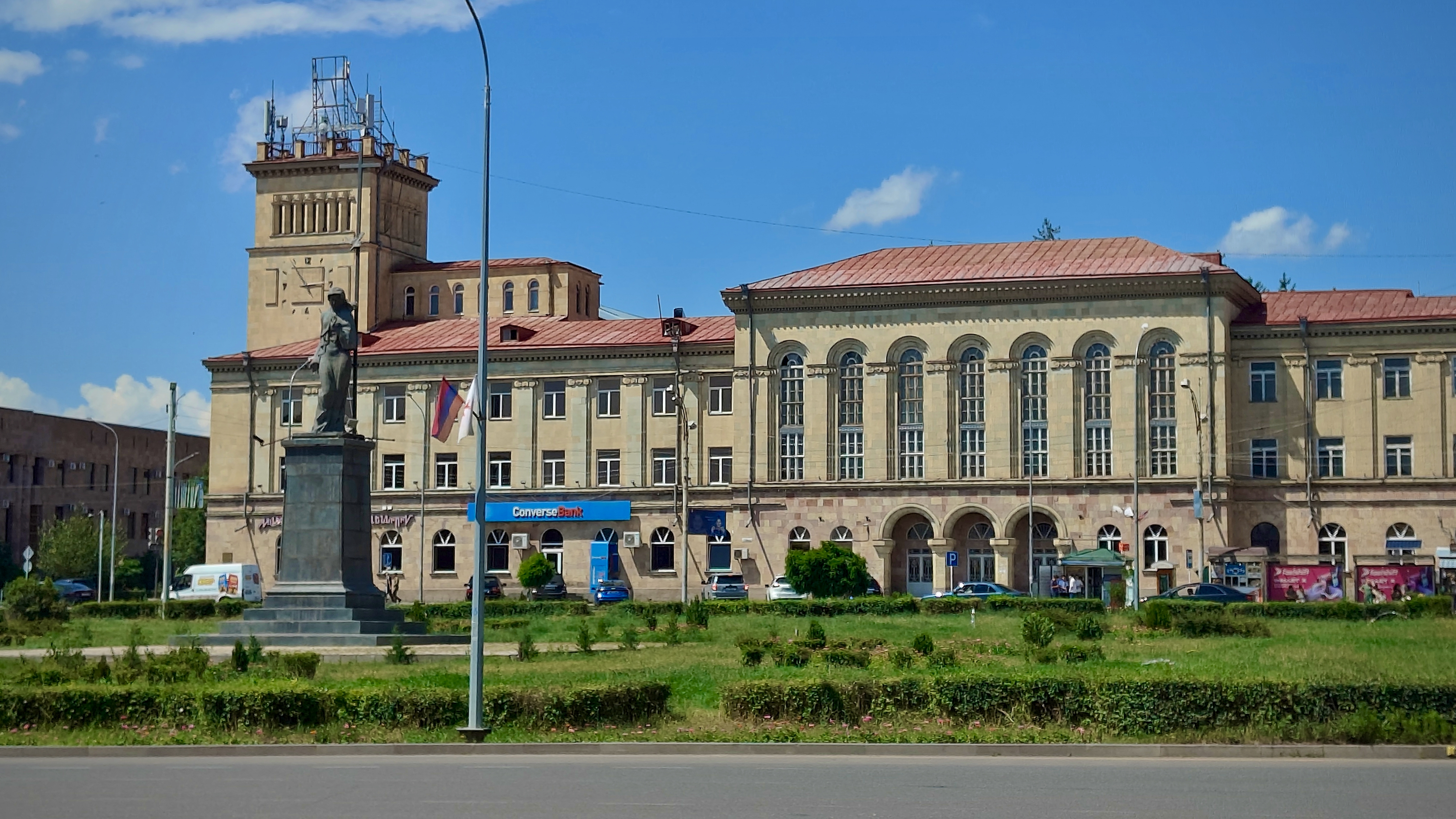
Independence Square in 2025

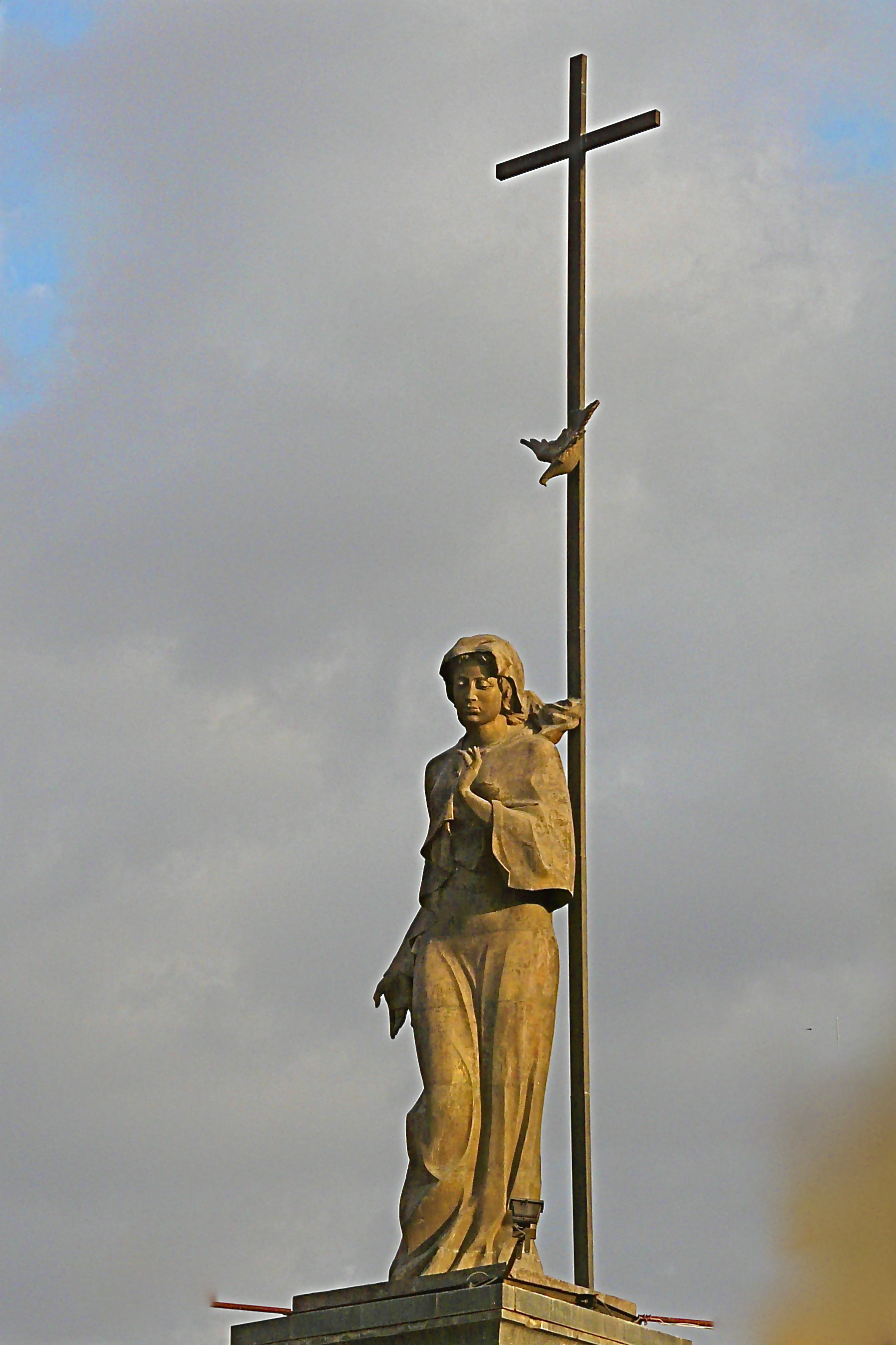
The statue of the Armenian Girl

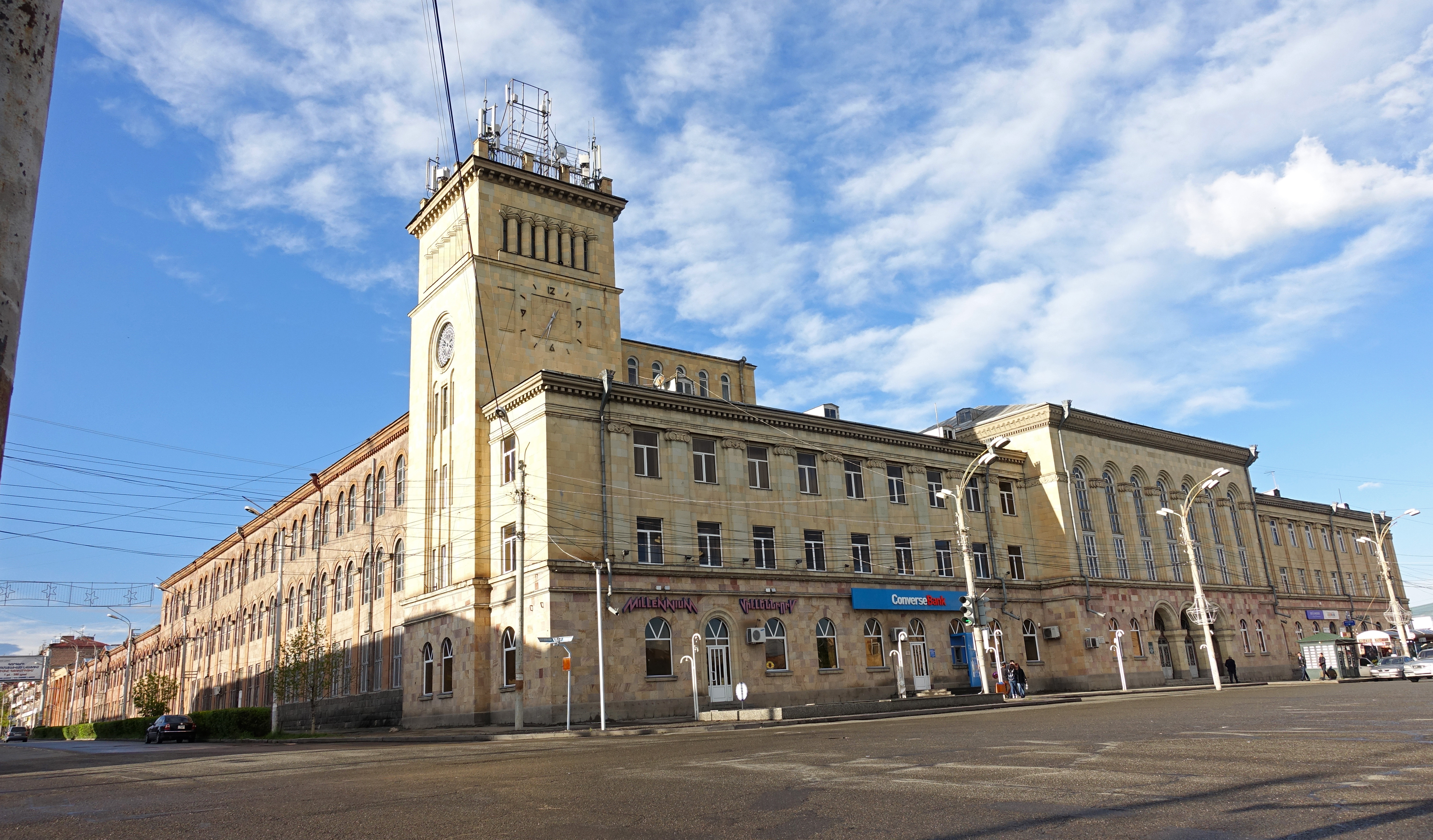
The clock tower of the former textile factory

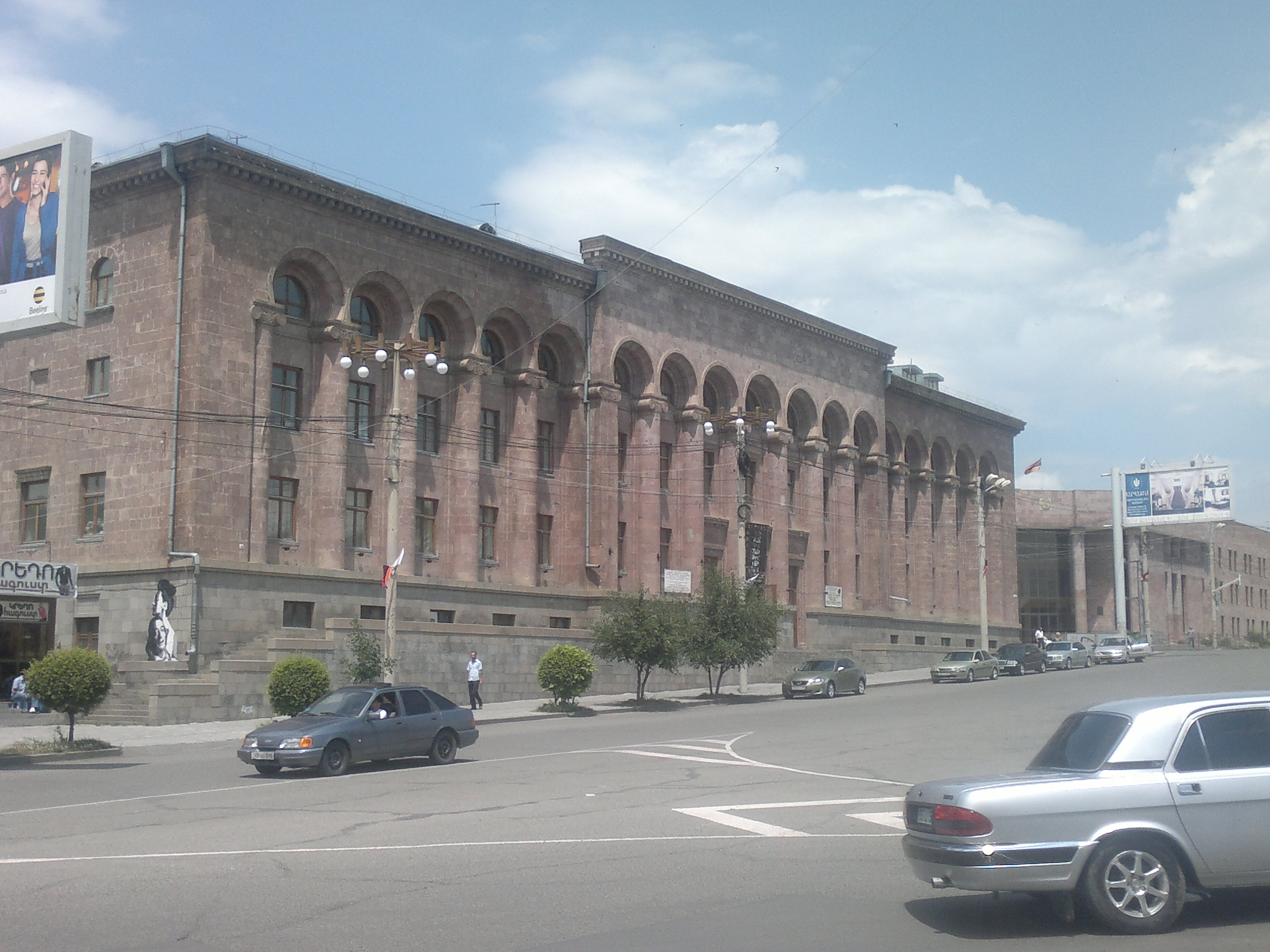
The Fine Arts Academy

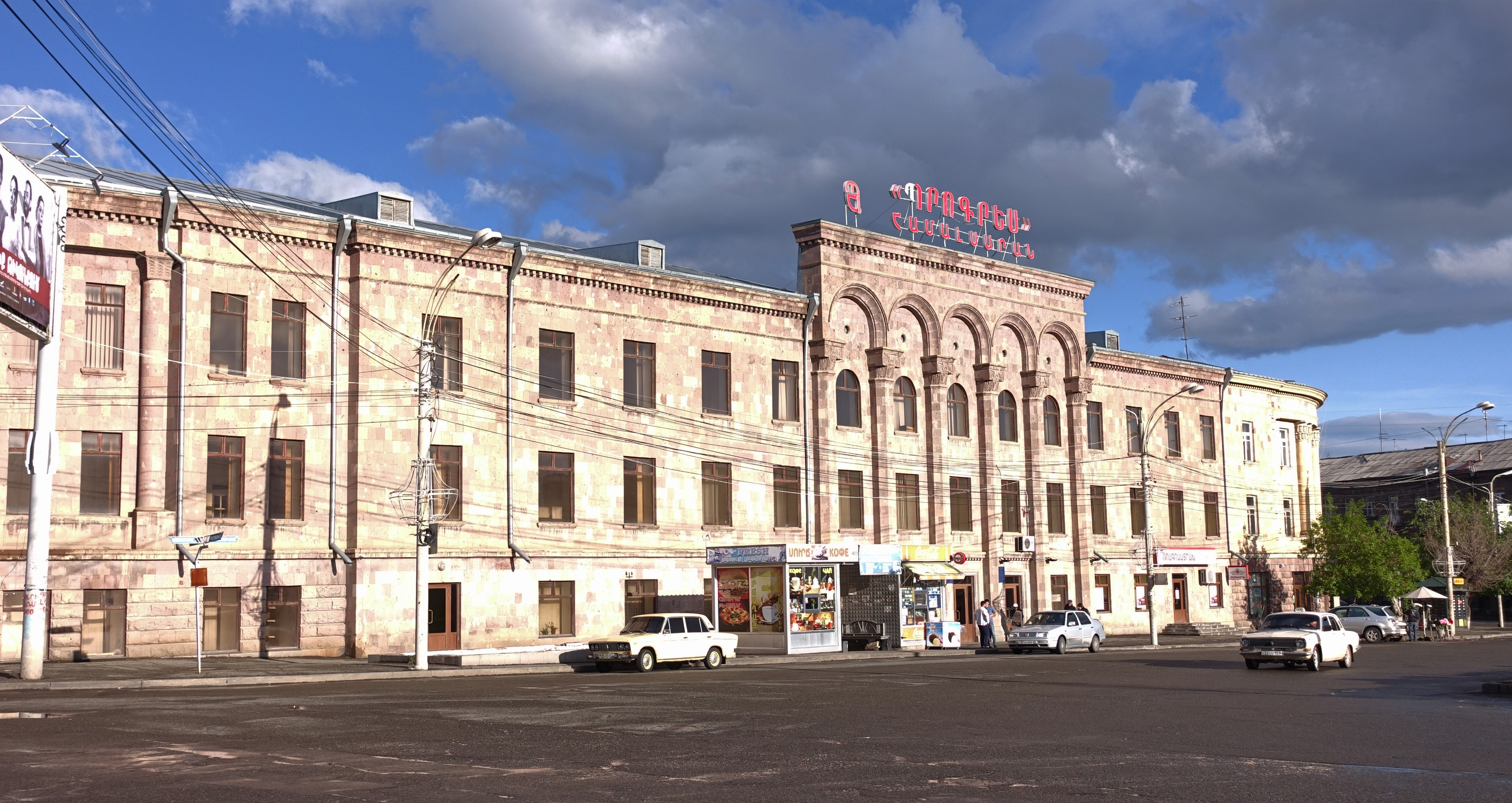
Progress University
