= Khachatur Abovyan Park =

Coordinates: 40°11′30″N 44°31′41″E

Khachatur Abovyan Square
- Խաչատուր Աբովյանի Պուրակ (Armenian)
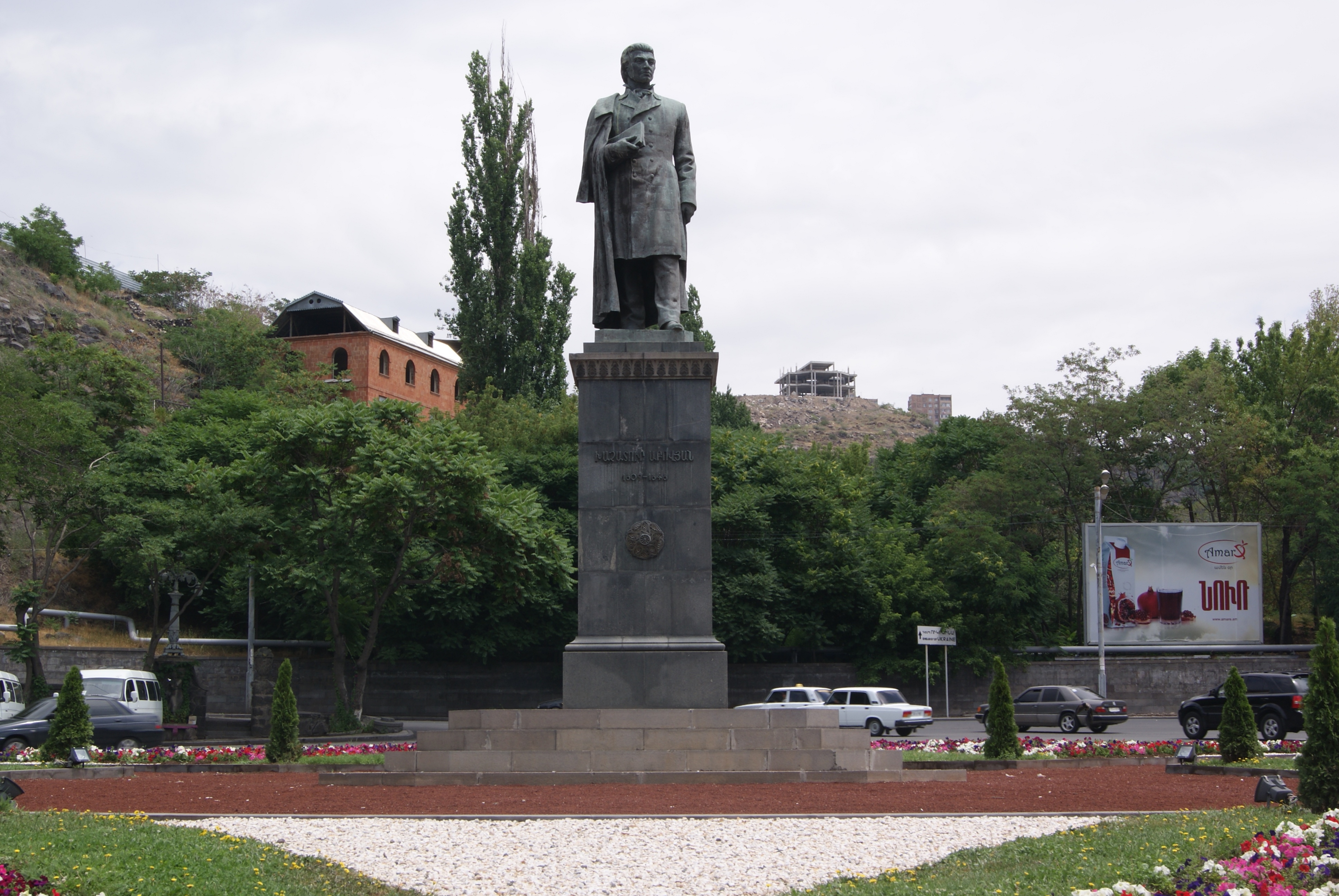
- Khachatur Abovyan Park
- Interactive map of Khachatur Abovyan Square
- Location: Kentron district Yerevan, Armenia

History
- Built: 1950

Site notes
- Area: 7,500 m^{2} (81,000 sq ft)
- Governing body: Yerevan City Council

Khachatur Abovyan Park (Armenian: Խաչատուր Աբովյանի Պուրակ Khachatur Abovyani Purak), is a park located in the Kentron district of Yerevan, Armenia, at the north of Abovyan Street. It forms the starting point of the Abovyan Street. The Yerevan State Medical University is located at the southern edge of the park.

The park is named after the noted Armenian writer of the 19th century, Khachatur Abovian.

It has a round-shaped garden centered with the statue of Khachatur Abovyan. The park was opened in 1950.

In 2018, the Hrant Matevosyan Cultural Center and Museum was built within the park.
