= Michael von der Nonne =

Russian architect and engineer (1838–1919)

- Born: 12 May 1838; Saint Petersburg Governorate, Russian Empire
- Died: 12 April 1919 (aged 80); Baku, Azerbaijan Democratic Republic
- Education: First Cadet Corps
- Occupation: Architect
- Awards: Order of St. Vladimir (1895); Order of St. Stanislav (1898)
- Buildings: Iranian Consulate, Yerevan

Michael von der Nonne (Russian: Михаил Августович фон дер Нонне, romanized: Mikhail Avgustovich fon der Nonne; 12 May 1838 – 12 April 1919) was a Russian architect of German descent. He is best known for being state architect-engineer of Erivan Governorate and a member of the City Duma.

== Background ==
Michael von der Nonne was born on 12 May 1838, in St. Petersburg Governorate. His father, Johann Georg August Ernst von der Nonne (1798–1860), was a German nobleman originally from the city of Bodenwerder in Lower Saxony. His mother, Anna (1810–1891), belonged to baronial family of von Tornau.

== Career ==
On 4 June 1854, he entered military service as deputy chief of staff. In 1868, he moved to Yerevan. From 1876 to 1909, he was the chief architect of Yerevan. He is the author of a number of public and private construction projects, including the architect of the building of the Yerevan prison (built 1800, the prison has not survived), the male gymnasium on Astafyevskaya (currently Abovyan street, built 1881), the Iranian Consulate building (now on Republic Street), the male gymnasium on Nazarovskaya Street (now Amiryan Street), the apartment buildings of Murtuzgulu Khan (built 1900), and the Shustov Cognac Alcohol Production Plant (now Yerevan Ararat Brandy Factory, built 1907).

He was promoted to the rank of colonel on 20 June 1884. In 1895, he was awarded the Order of St. Vladimir, and in 1897, the Order of St. Stanislav. Later, in 1898, he was elected to the Yerevan City Duma, at the same time, he was the Chairman of the Provincial Guardianship of Prisons Committee.

He died on 12 April 1919 from senile marasmus and is buried in the Lutheran cemetery of Baku in Azerbaijan.

== Family ==
He was married to Sofia Nikolayevna and had seven children with her.

1. Nikolai Mikhailovich (b. 1901, Moscow) worked in the Main Directorate of Land Management and Agriculture in the Caucasus, Tbilisi (1912–1916);
2. Sergei Mikhailovich, deputy clerk, collegiate secretary in the Yerevan Governorate Treasury (1912–1917);
3. Boris Mikhailovich, married Lydia Pavlovna, had two issues including Mikhail (b. 1894);
4. Mikhail Mikhailovich, married Anna Sergeyevna, had two issues, including Alexander von der Nonne (1923–2009).

He also had several brothers and sisters, namely Alexander (b. 1831), Theodore (b. 1836), Nikolaus (1836–1908) and Anna (married Eugen Alexander von Ovander in 1864). His elder brother Nikolaus von der Nonne was also an engineer and architect, as well as Mayor of Baku.
