= Iranian Consulate, Yerevan =

Coordinates: 40.176361°N 44.515231°E

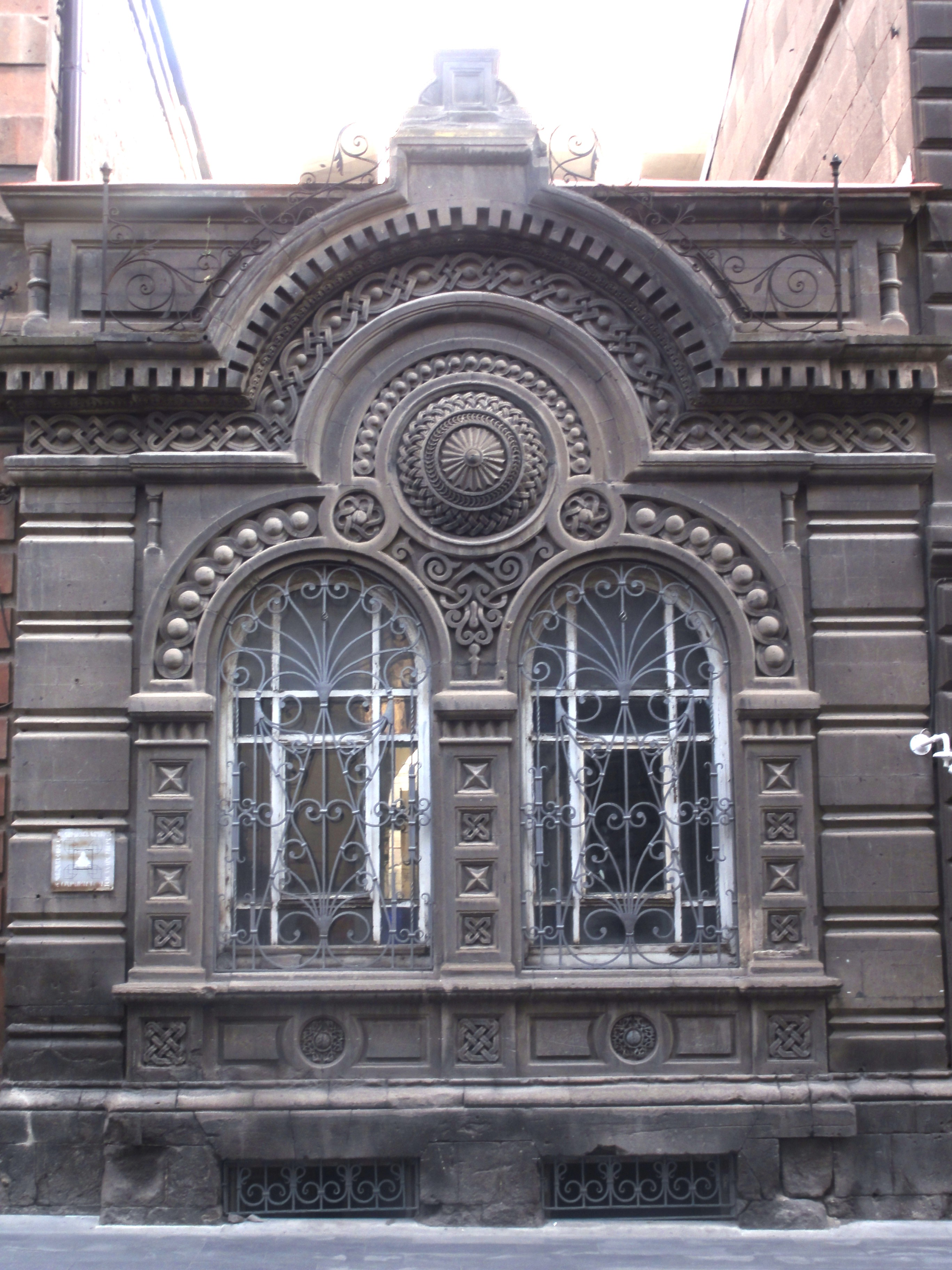
Persian Consulate

The Persian Consulate, a historic-cultural building located on Hanrapetutyun Street in the Kentron District, of Yerevan, Armenia.

== History ==
According to architect Varazdat Harutyunyan, this part of the street belonged to Persia's Hadji Abbas Karbalayi Abdulhusein in the 1850s. The architect, Mikhail von der Nonne was German and state architect of Erivan Governorate. The Consulate operated until 1920.

Now the building has been rented out for about 25 years by Yerevan’s City Council for 600 rubles a month. The Armenian division headquarters were here from 1922 to 1937. Later, the Armenian Relief Committee, which was headed by poet Hovhannes Tumanyan, worked in the building for three years. During the Soviet Union in 1924, the school worked in the evening for Communists. Then, for 18 years, the Armenian military prosecutor's office was there.

From 1964 to the present, the Armenian Historical Monuments Conservation Company is located here. Its founders are a painter and academician Martiros Saryan, architect Varazdat Harutyunyan and archeologist and historian Babken Arakelyan.

== Structure ==
The building is one story high and is made of black tuff rocks. On the top, in the center, there is a large circular design and the upper arches of the window are covered with ornaments. The walls of the Iranian Consul's office were completely covered with frescoes. There is a mirrored prayer hall in the center of the room. There is a door to the left from the entrance, that has stairs that take you to the basement (this segment collapsed). Al. Tamanyan's son, Yuri Tamanyan, has been stationed in the building on his father's initiative. The story of the building's torch is interesting. The torch in the Consul's room was designed individually by Al. Tamanyan and ordered in Italy in 1927.

Renovation work was done and resulted in a parquet, chandelier, and heating system. It is also planned to upgrade outside the building and to repair other rooms.

== Frescoes ==
Frescoes date back to the construction period. The style is Oriental, Persian and rich in Armenian motives, which were made by Armenian masters. A striking example of this is the crosscuts left in the frescoes. The frescoes of the entrance to the arch, also feature gnats, dogs, veins, that are widely used in Armenian miniature paintings. Images and motifs on the upper part of the flower, skulls and birds are Persian.

During the renovation of the Consul's room, the frescoes were restored by a professional group of painters, who updated colors and completely renovated fragments.

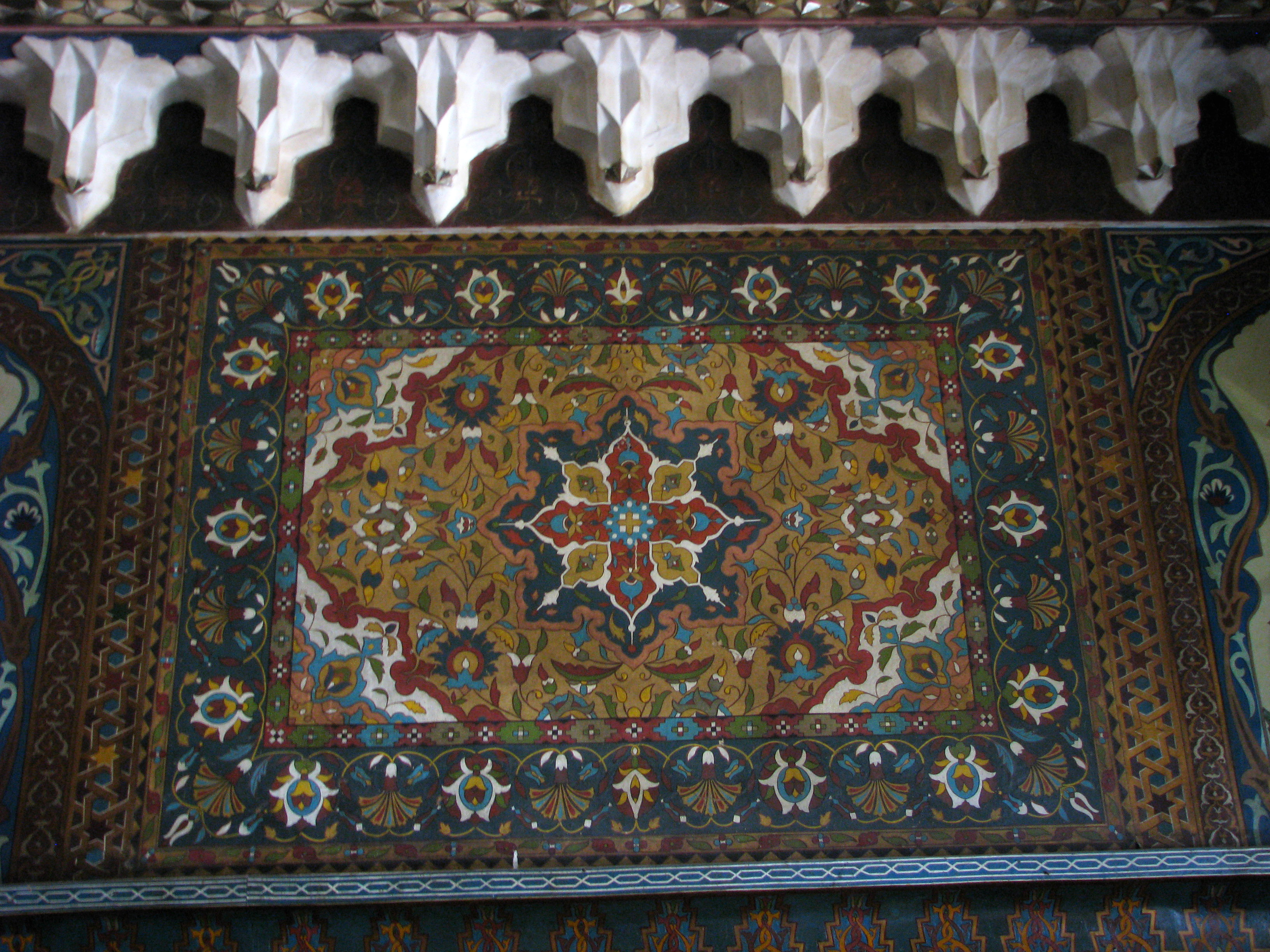

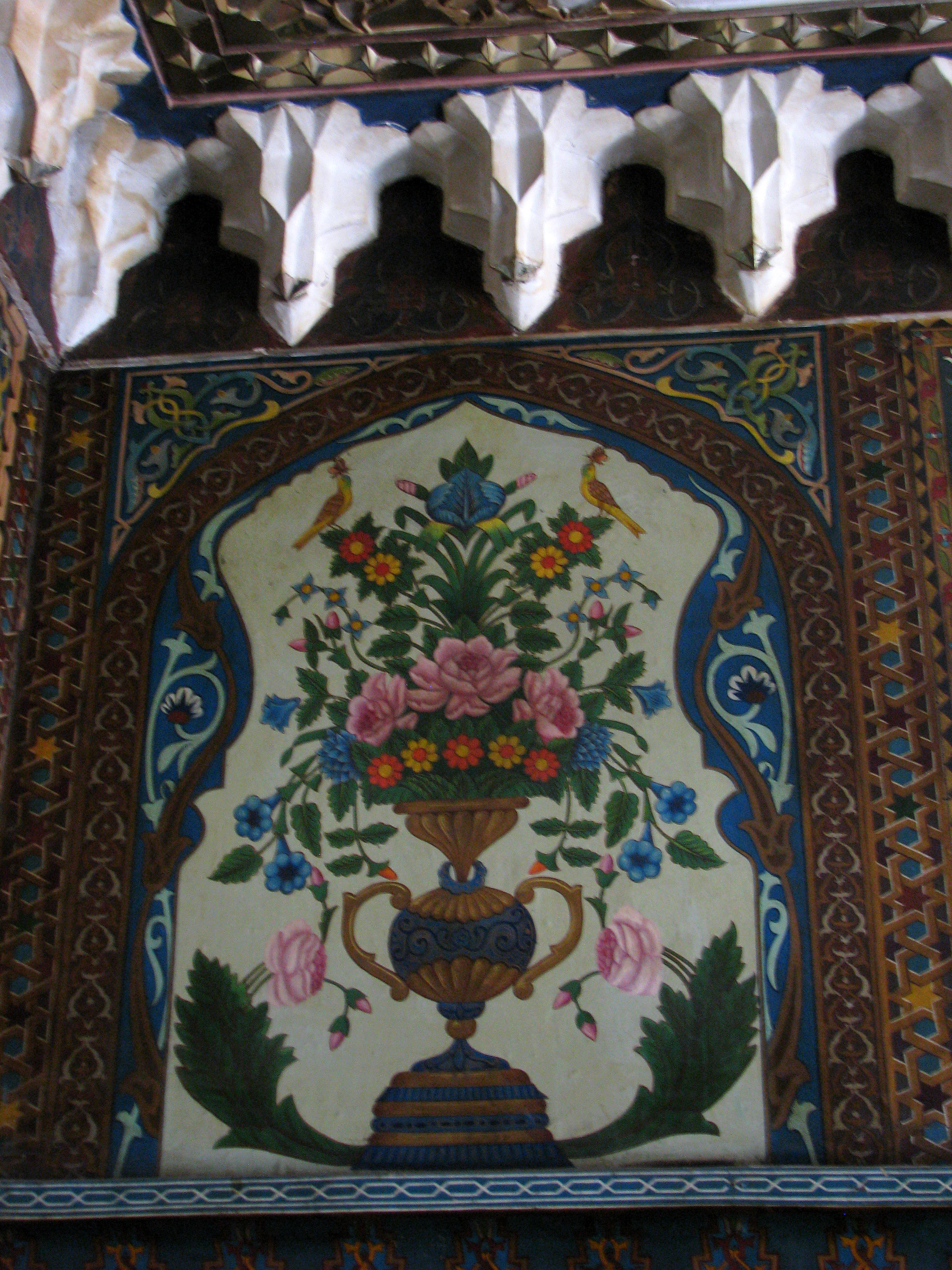

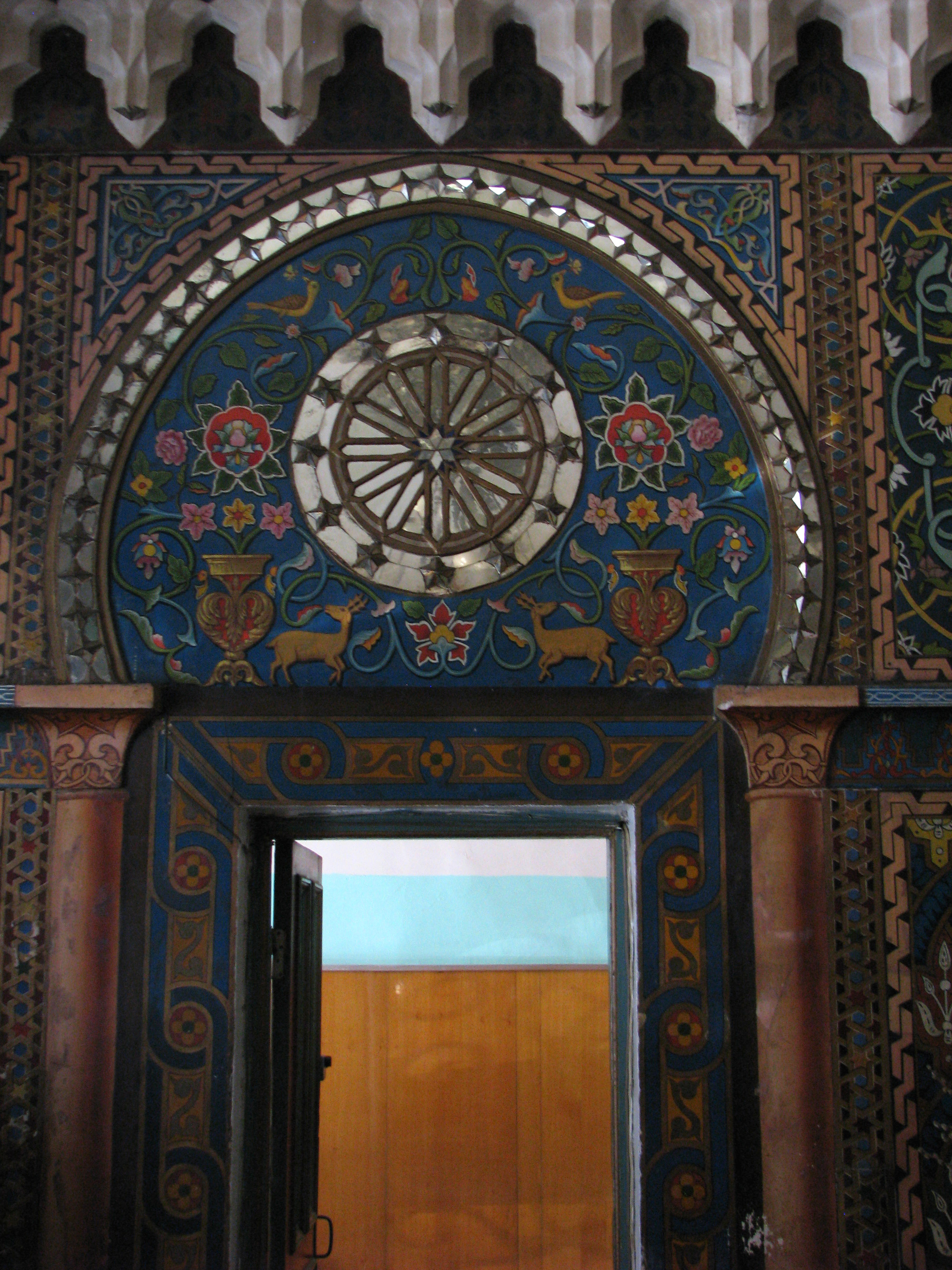

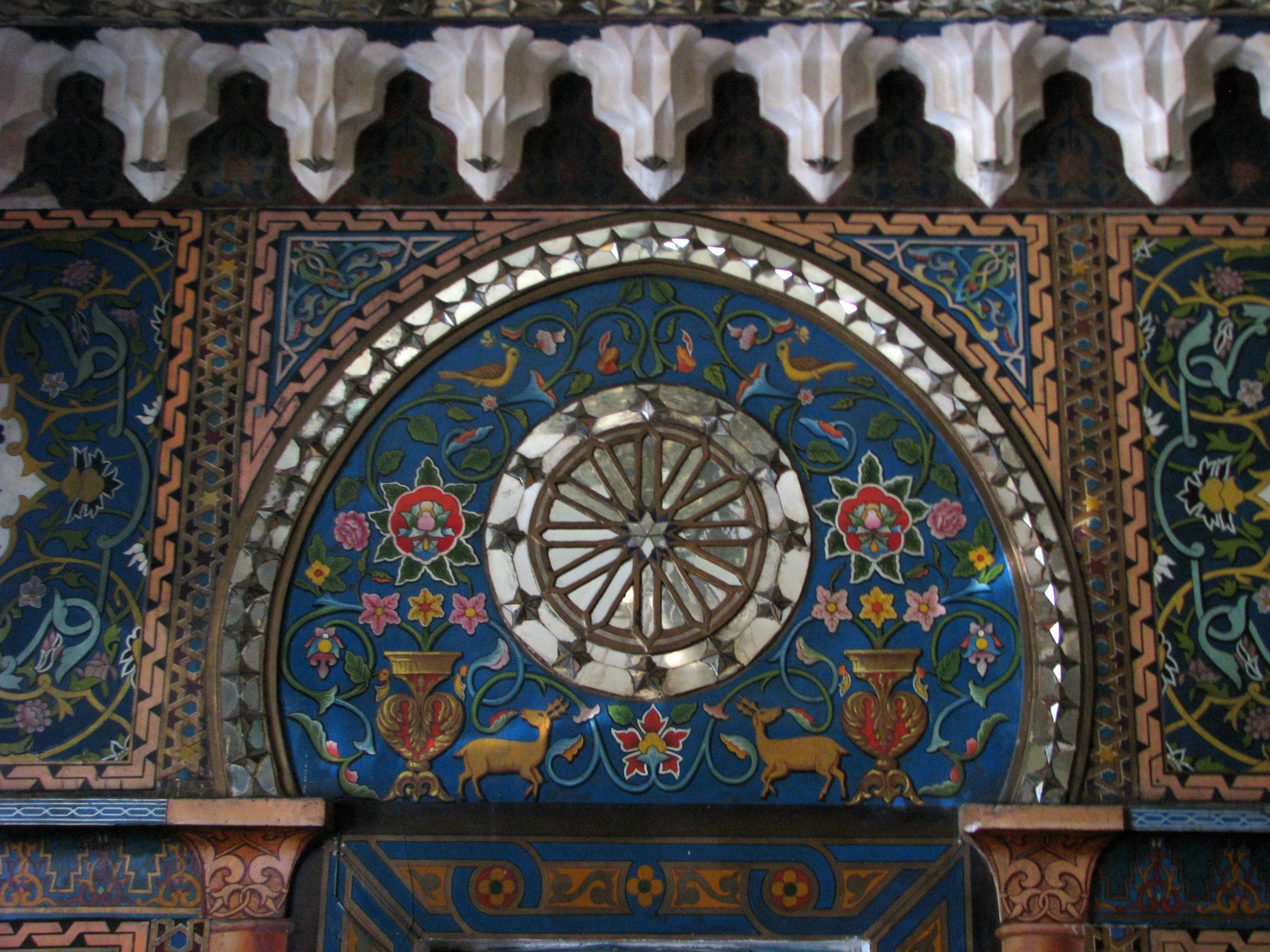

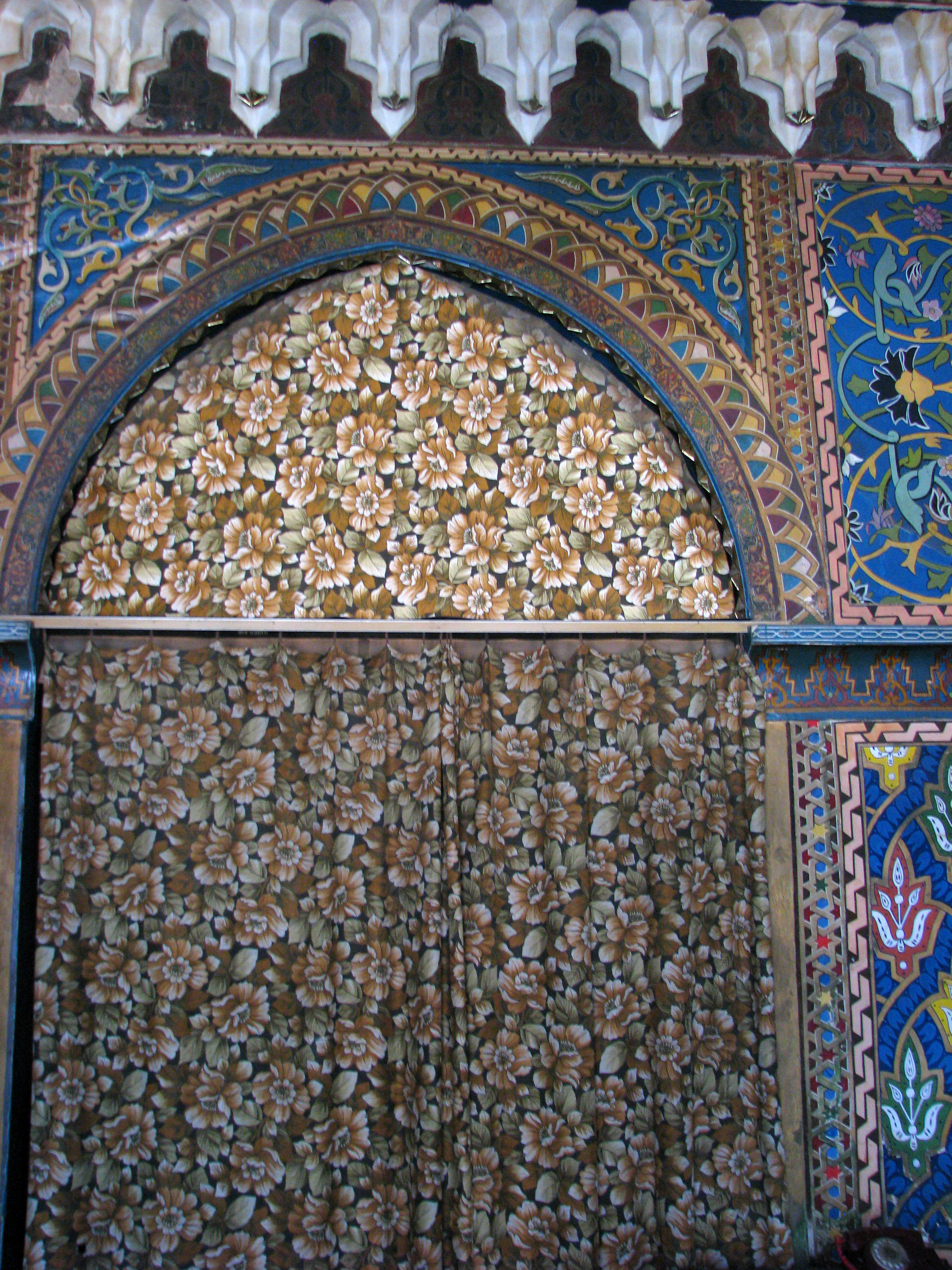

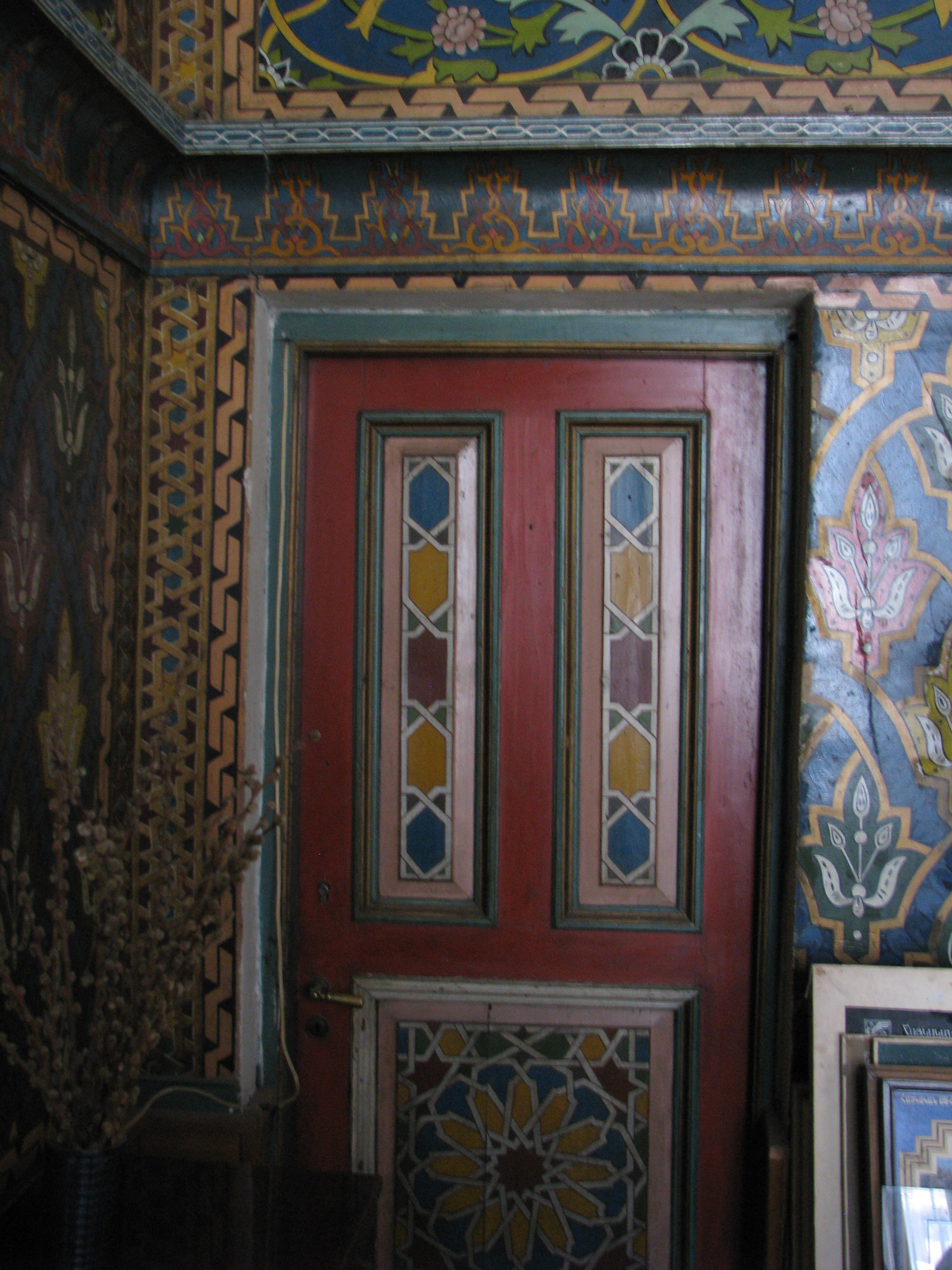

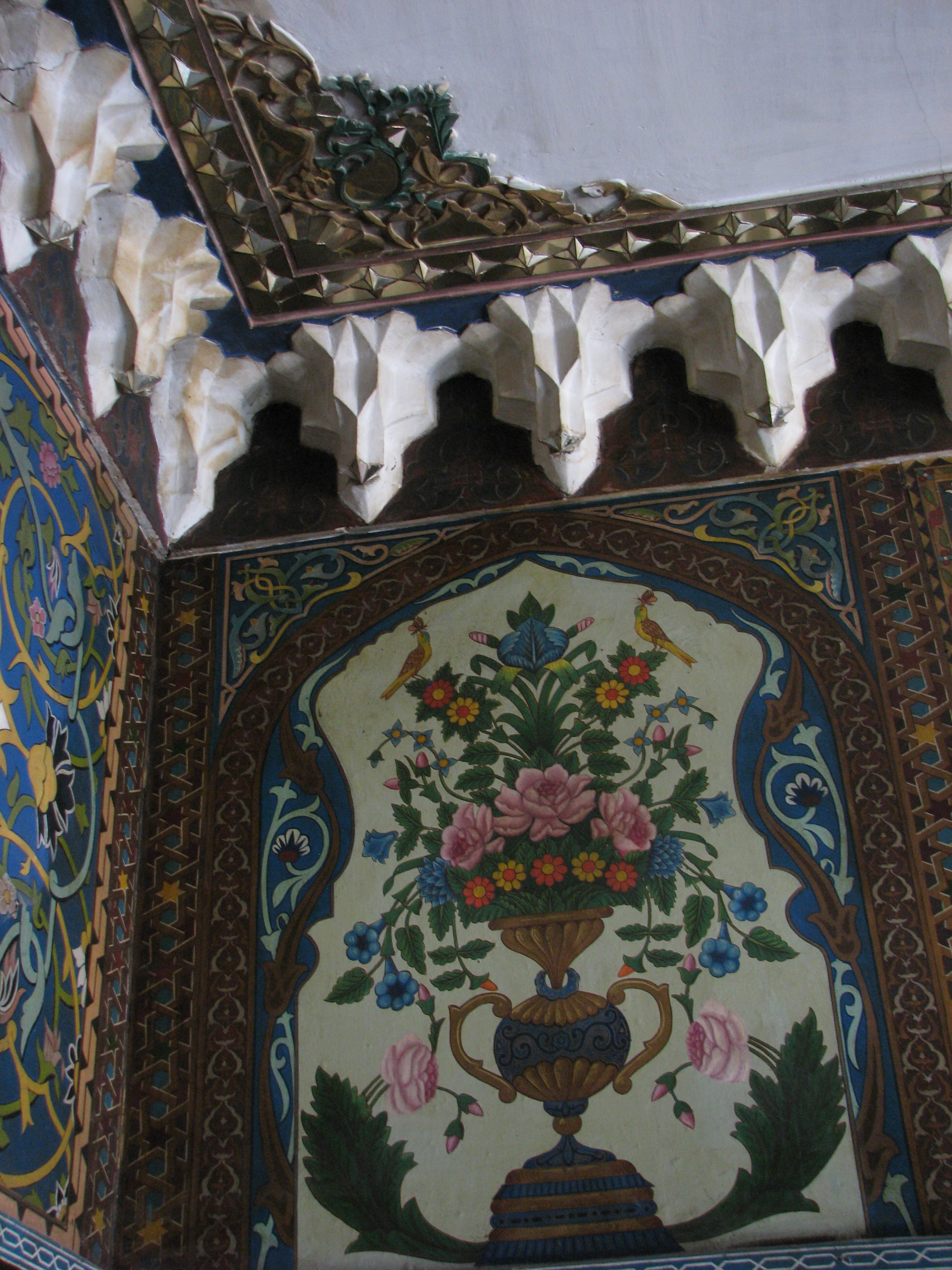

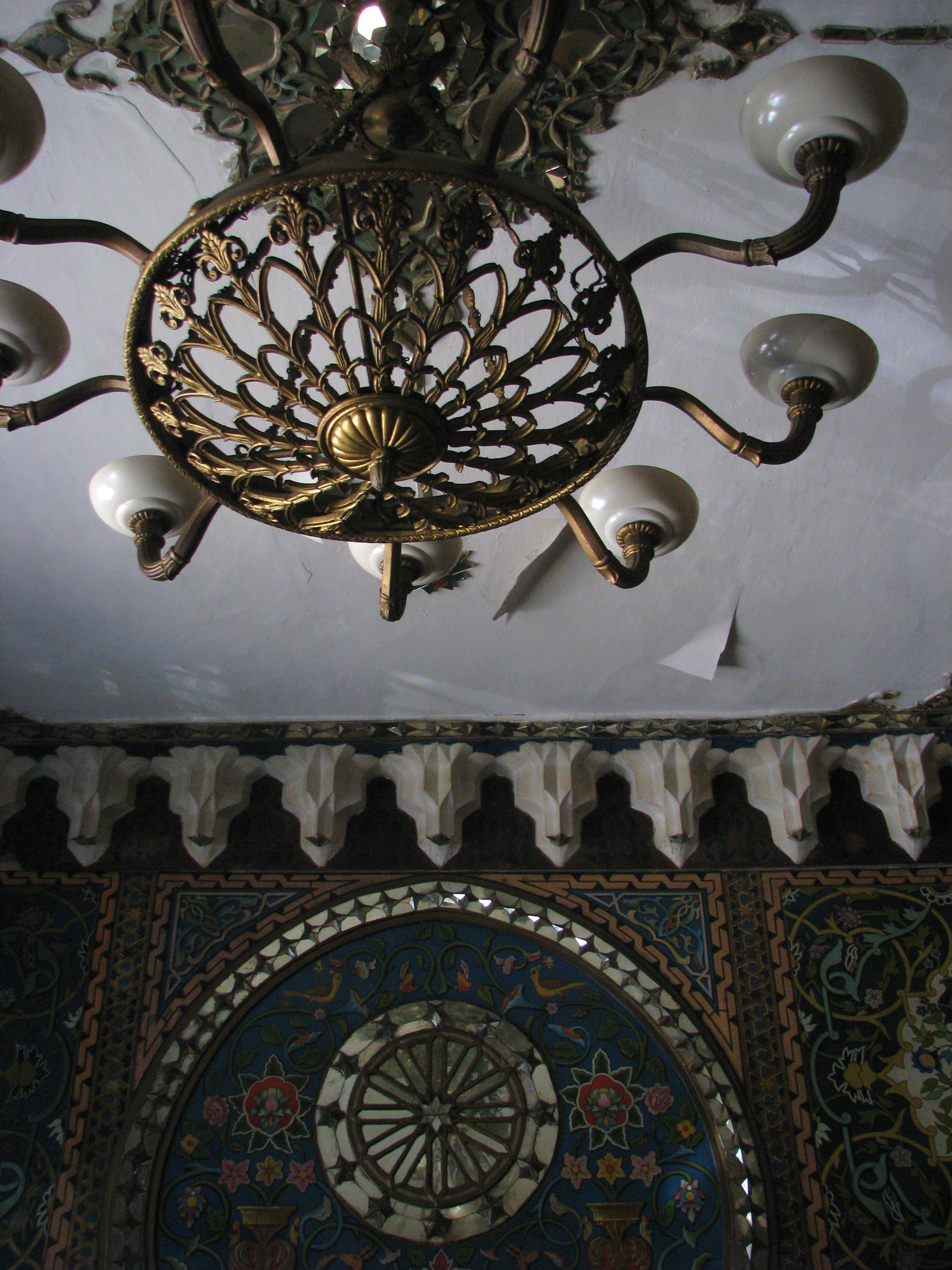

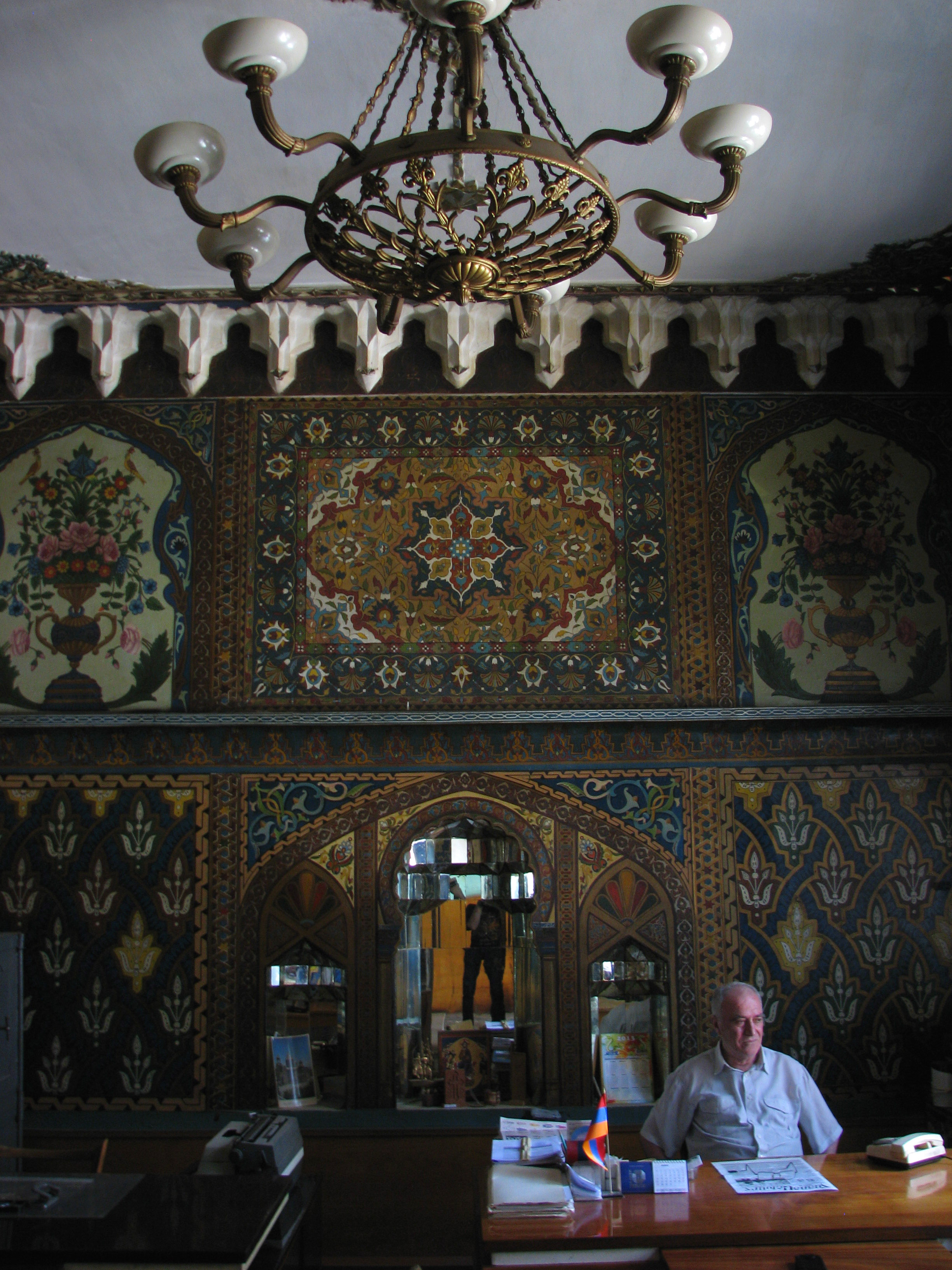

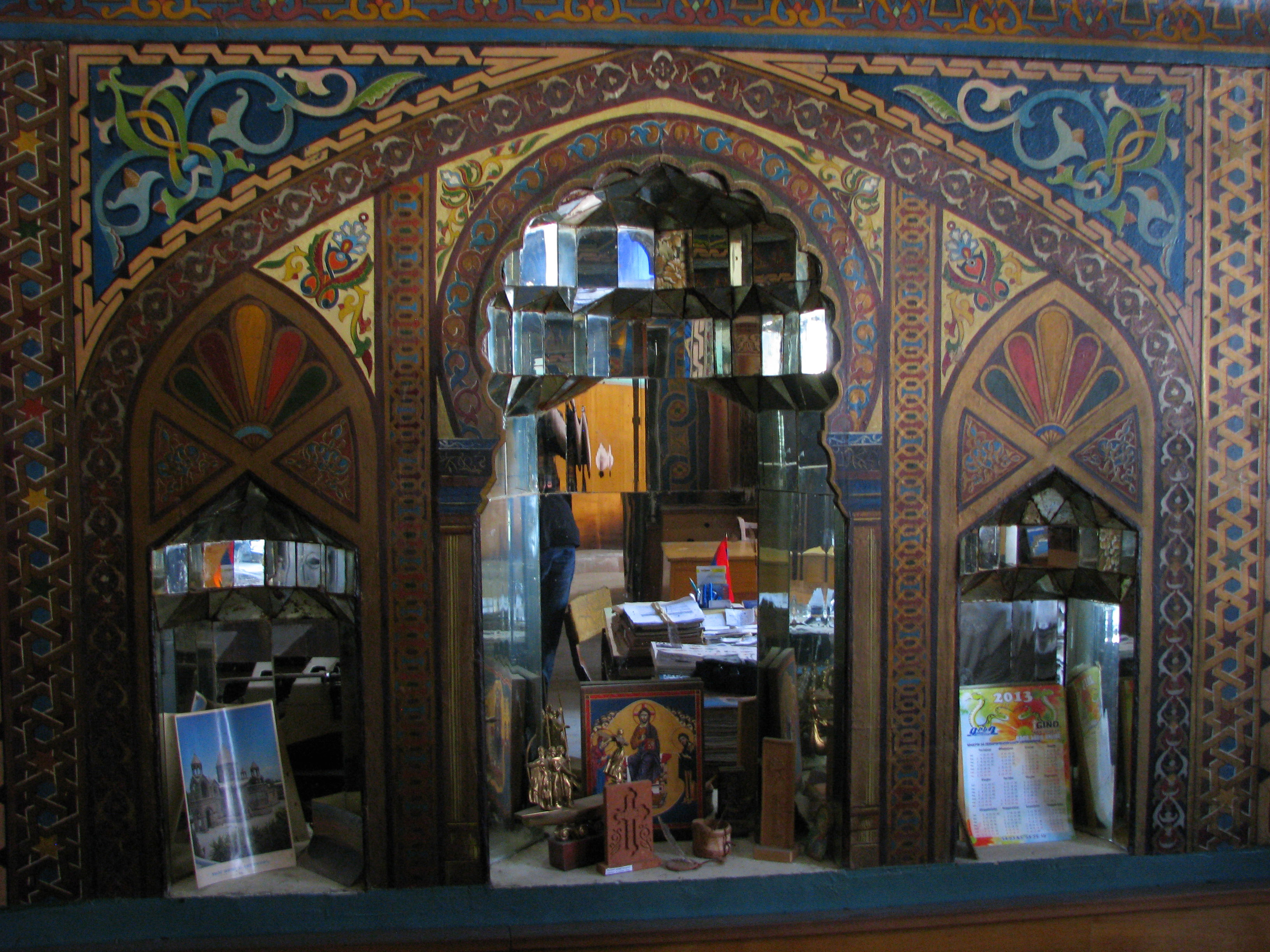

== Current status ==
In 2014, the Armenian Society for the Preservation of Historical Monuments reached an agreement on the joint use of the area with the Armenian office of the International Monument and Sightseeing Council (IMSS). The building was renovated by the initiative of the municipality and the Ministry of Culture. It is envisaged to furnish a concierge room with stylish furniture, to make it into the exhibition hall, and to incorporate it into the list of Yerevan's tourist attractions.
