= Yerevan =

Capital and largest city of Armenia

Yerevan Երևան
- Capital city
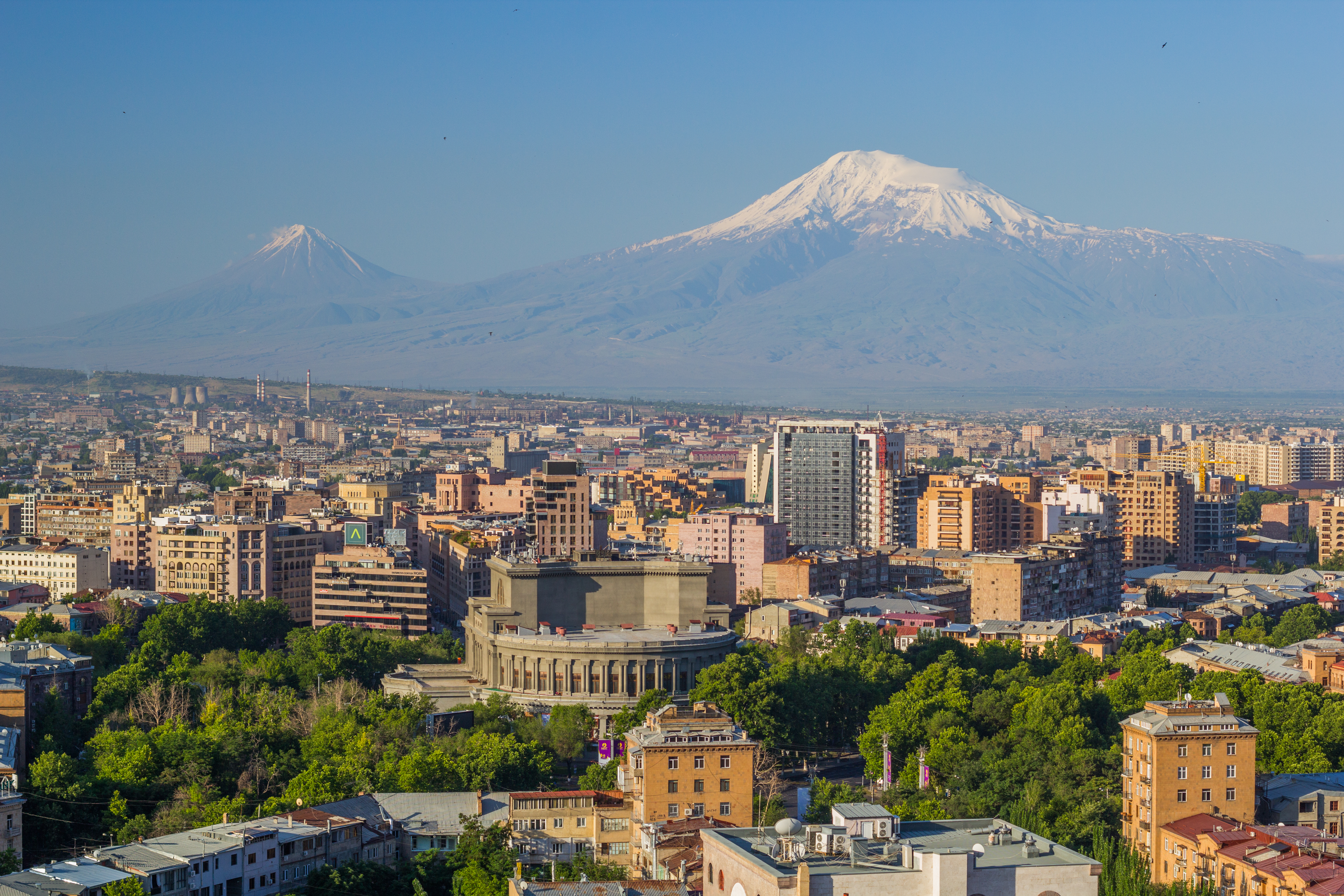
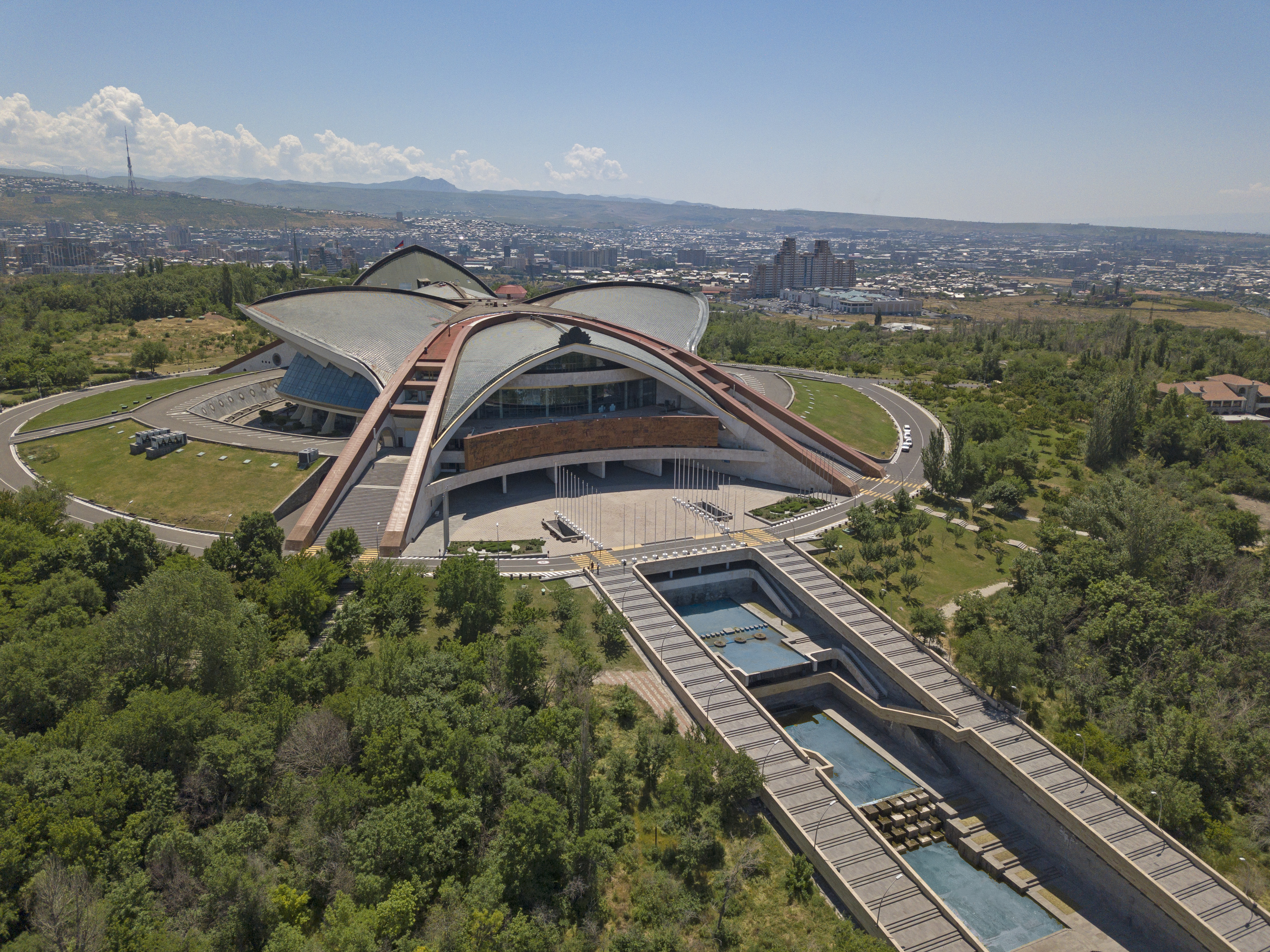
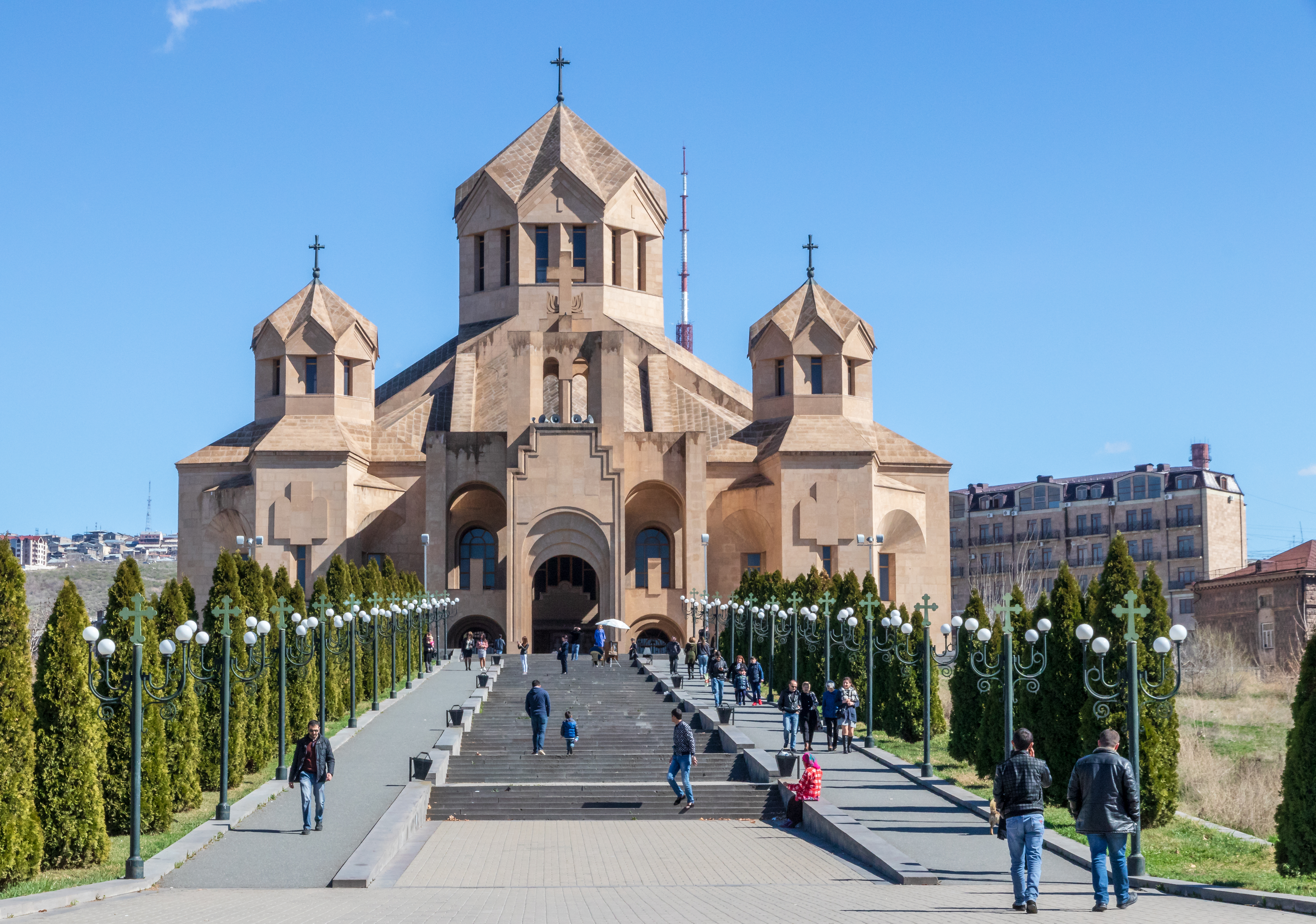
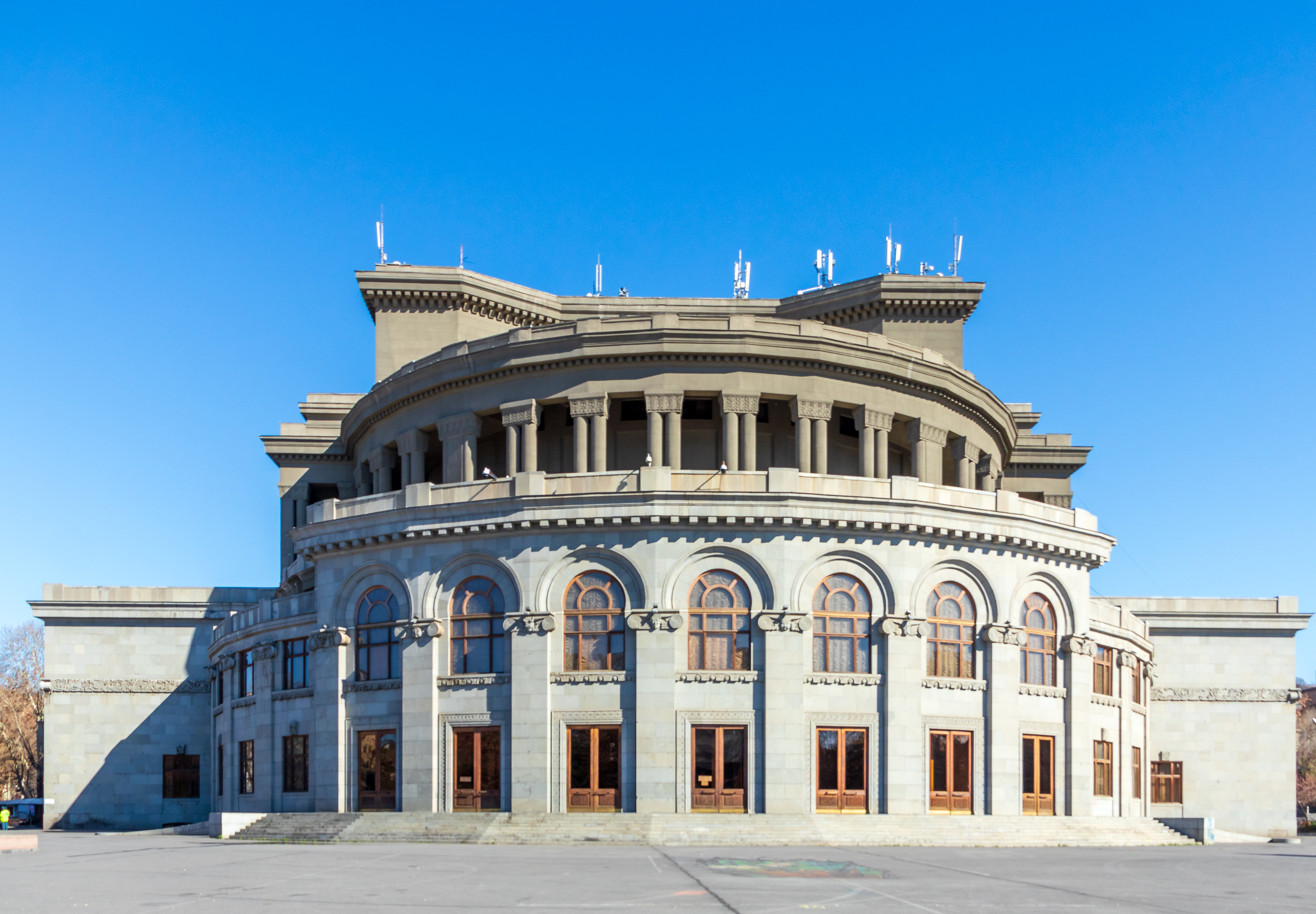
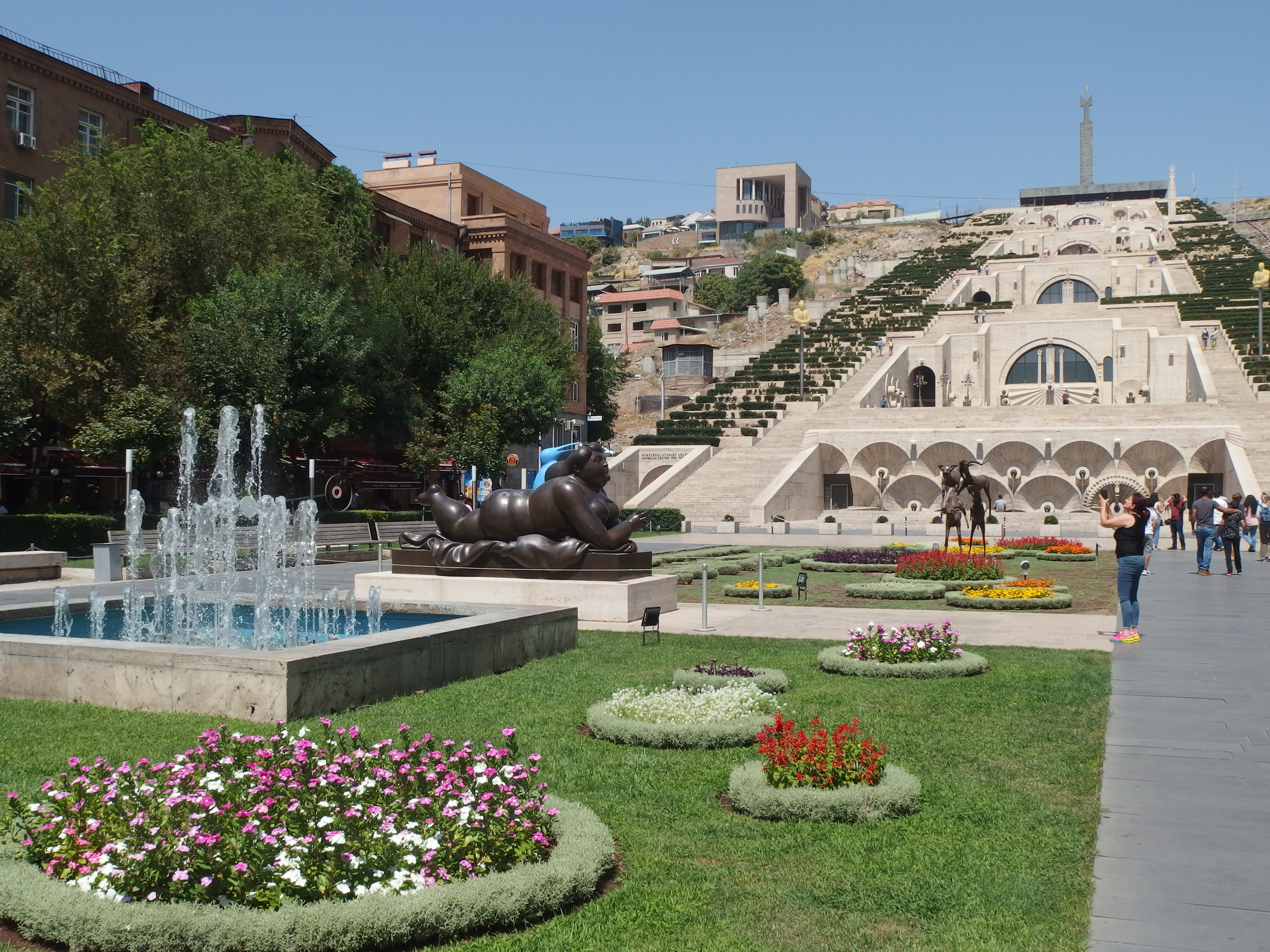
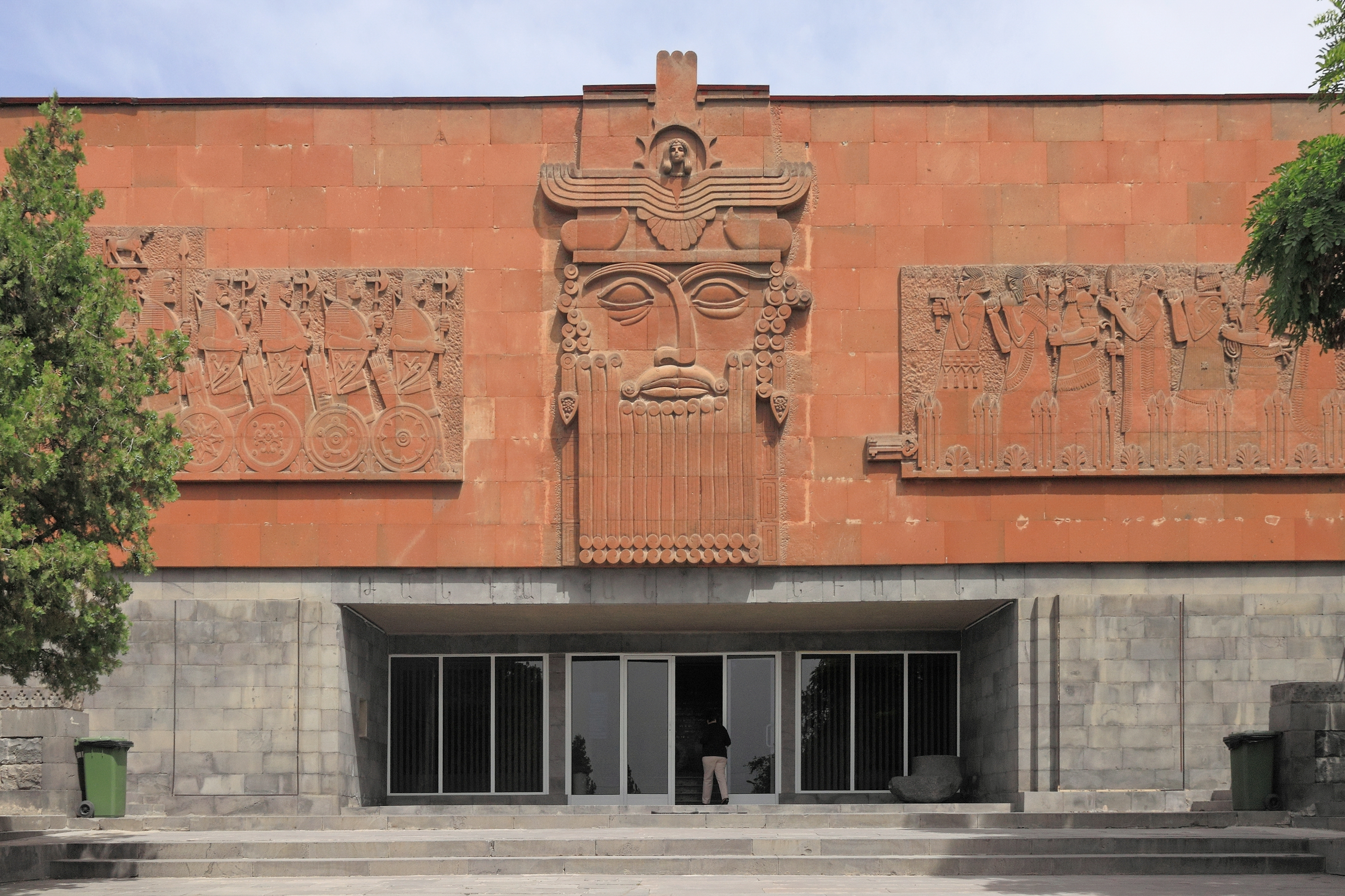
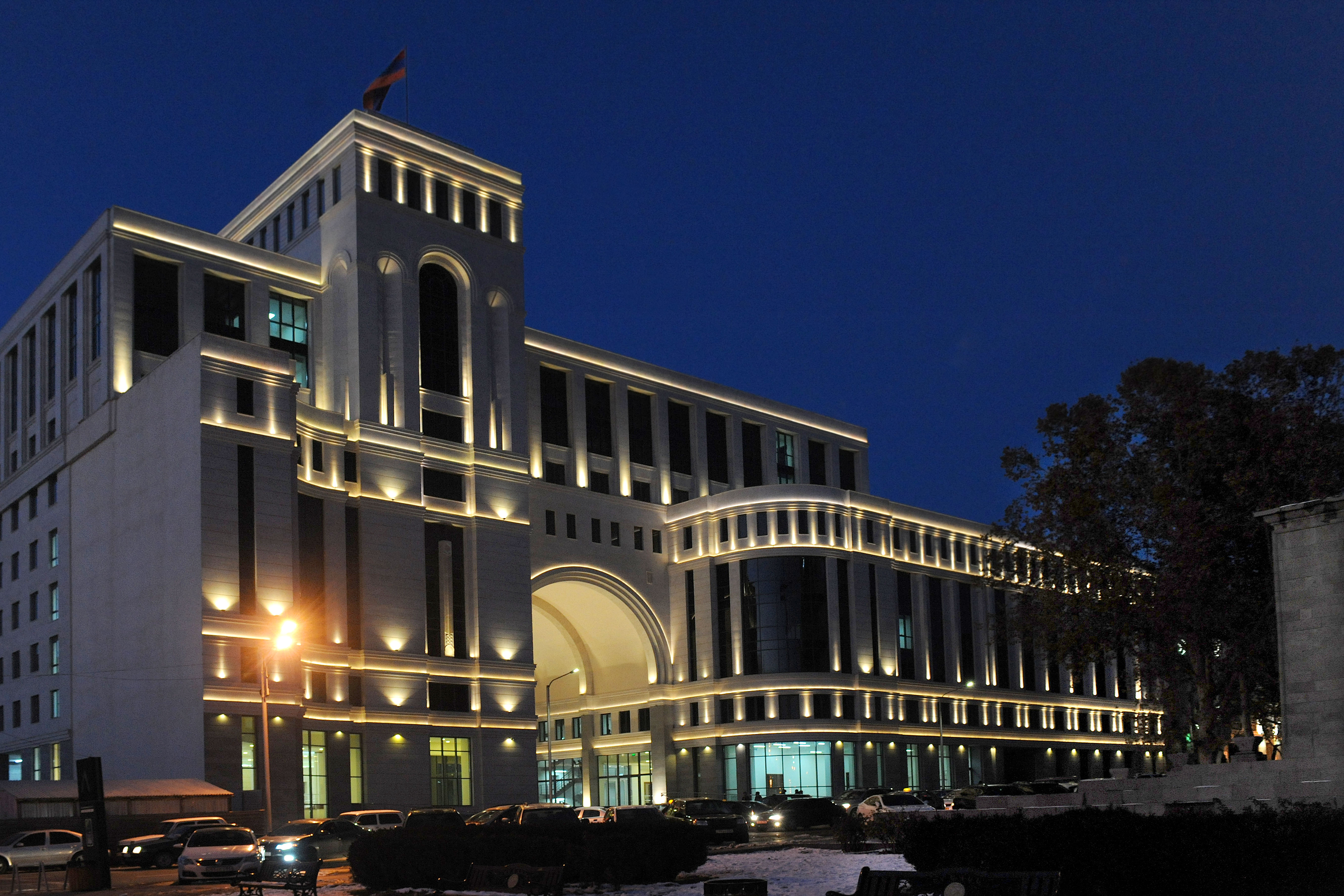
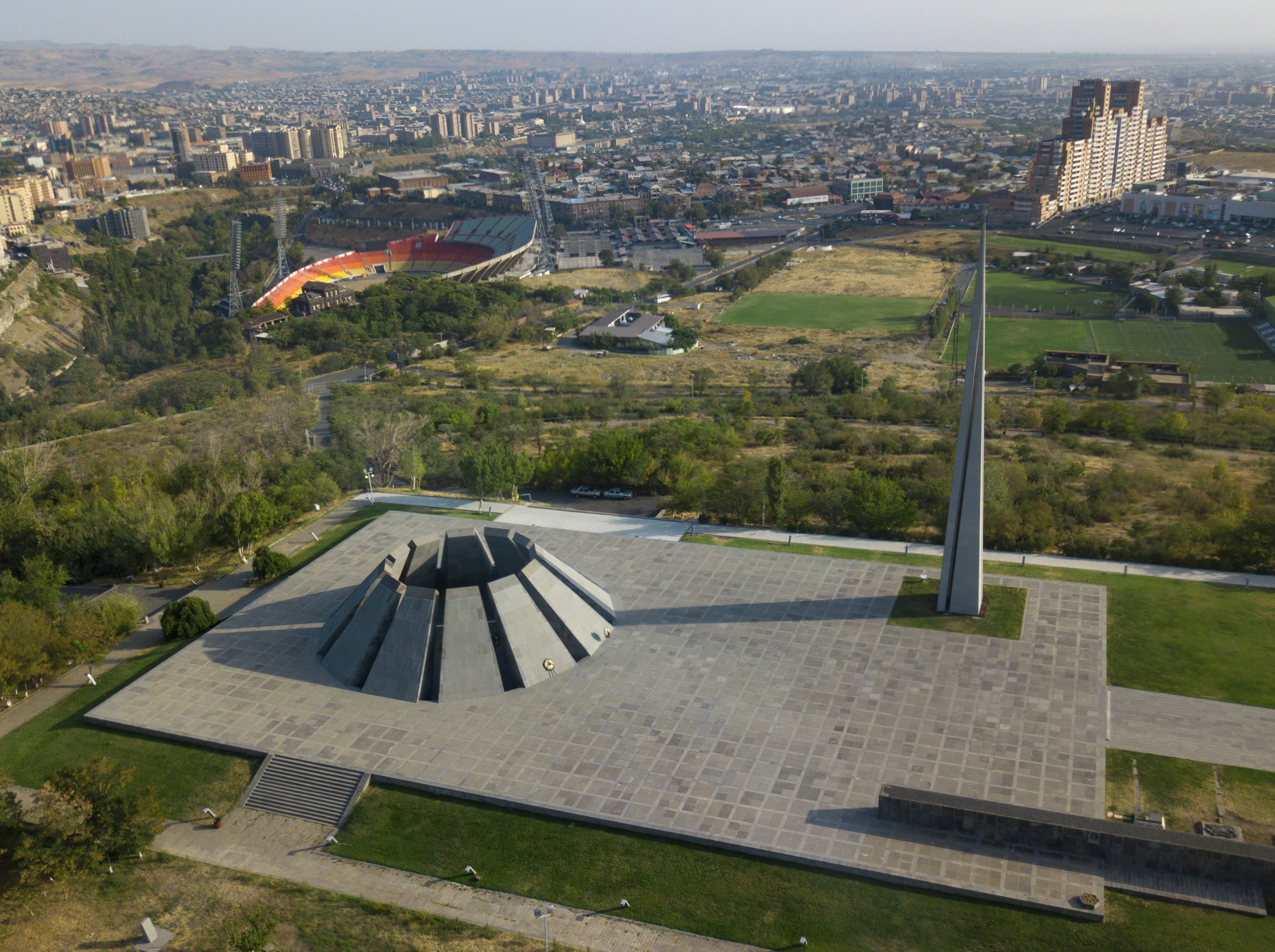
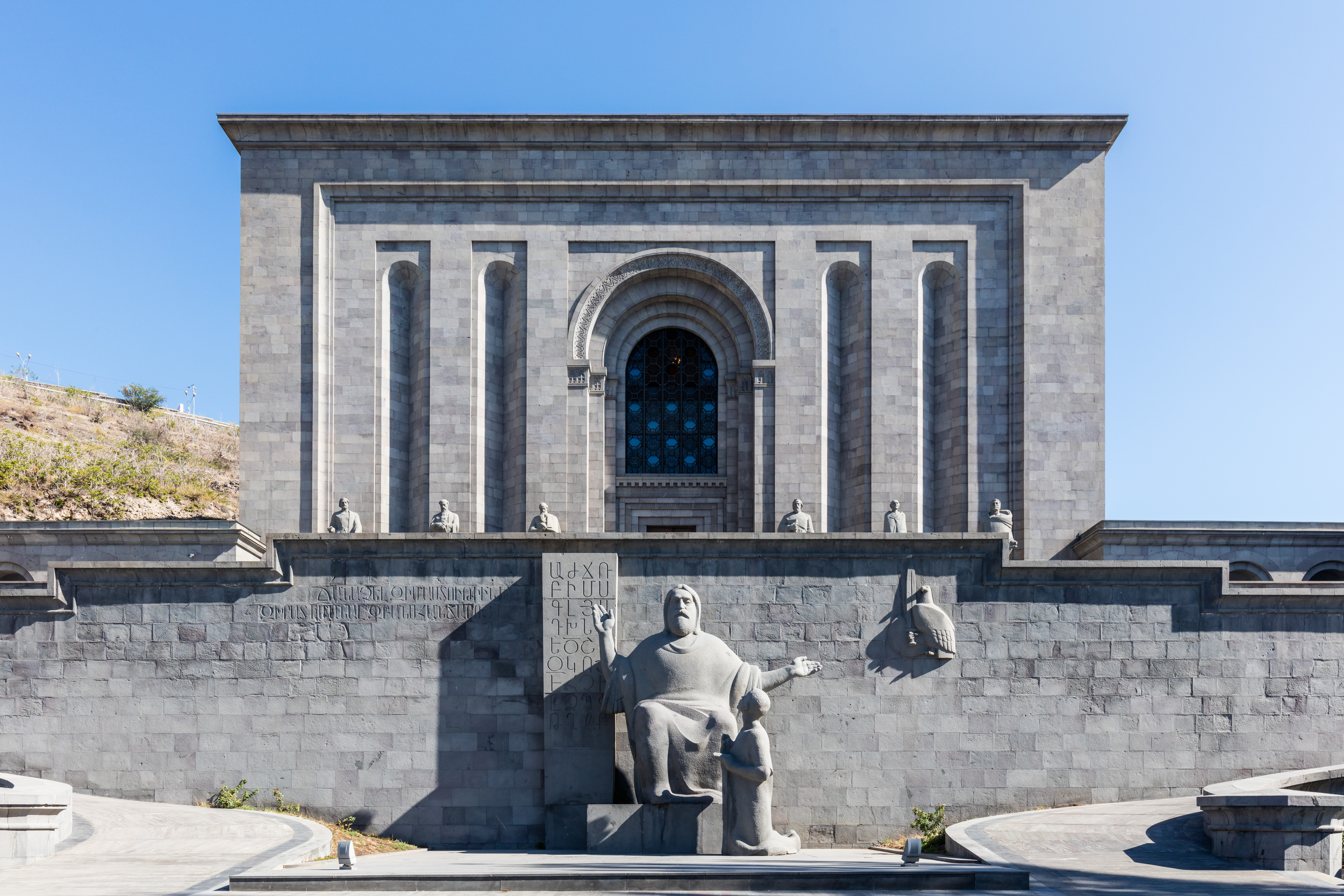
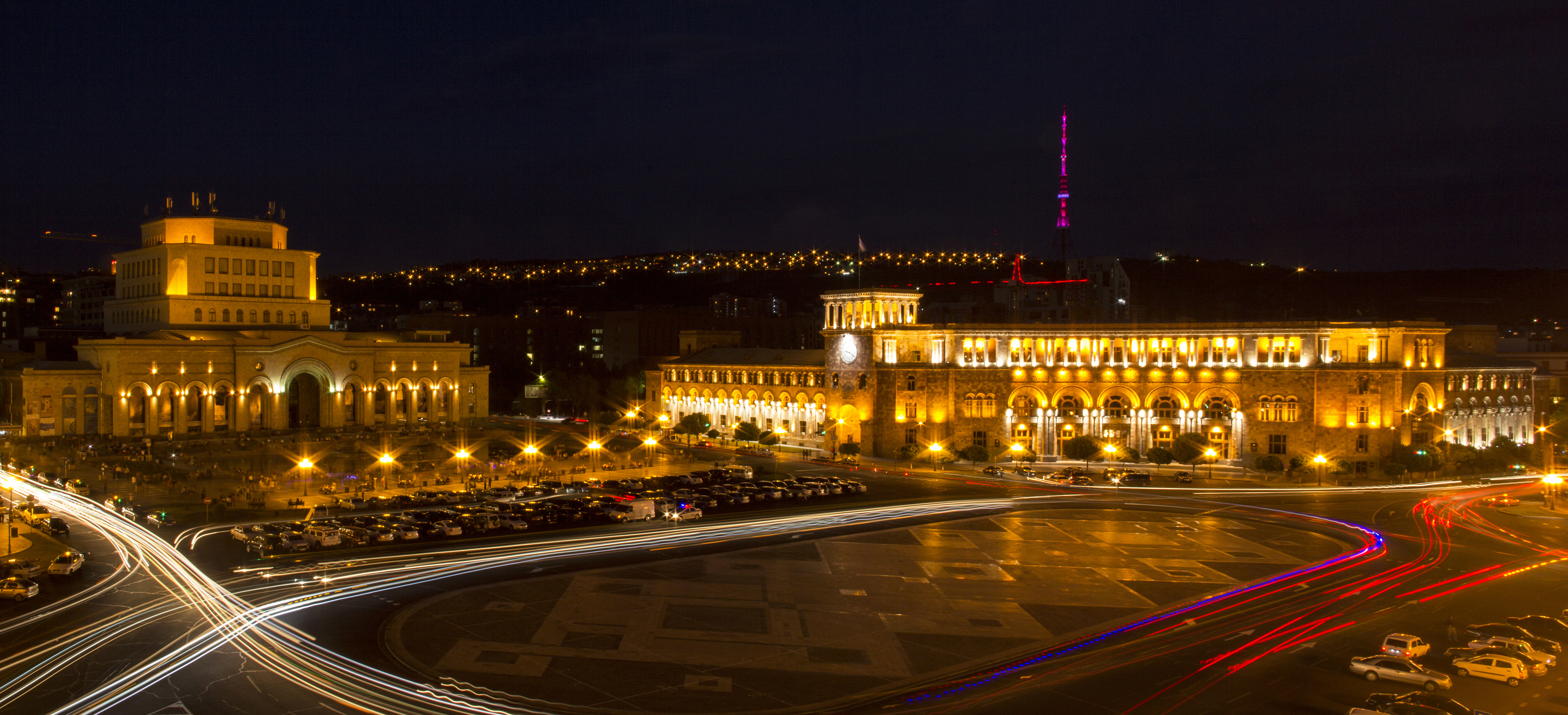
- Yerevan skyline with Mount Ararat Hamalir Cathedral Opera Theatre Cascade Erebuni Armenian MFA Tsitsernakaberd Matenadaran Republic Square and Government House

- Flag Seal
- Nicknames: "The Pink City", (Note: Armenian: վարդագույն քաղաք, romanised: vardaguyn k’aghak’, lit. 'rosy city'.) "Mother City" (Note: Literal translation of the Armenian word for 'capital' (մայրաքաղաք, mayrak’aghak’, or քաղաքամայր, k’aghak’amayr).)
- Anthem: "Erebuni-Yerevan"
- Interactive map of Yerevan
- Location within Armenia Location within Asia
- Coordinates: 40°10′40″N 44°30′46″E
- Country: Armenia
- Shengavit settled: c. 3300 BC
- Erebuni founded: 782 BC (by Argishti I)
- City status: 1 October 1879
- Capital: 19 July 1918 (de facto)
- Administrative Districts: 12

Government
  - Type: Mayor–Council
  - Body: City Council
  - Mayor: Tigran Avinyan

Area
  - Capital city: 223 km^{2} (86 sq mi)
- Highest elevation: 1,390 m (4,560 ft)
- Lowest elevation: 865 m (2,838 ft)

Population (2022 census)
  - Capital city: 1,086,677
  - Rank: 1st
  - Density: 4,870/km^{2} (12,600/sq mi)
  - Metro (2001): 1,420,000
- Demonym(s): Yerevantsi(s), Yerevanite(s)

GDP (Nominal, 2023)
  - Capital city: US$15.932 billion · 1st
  - Per capita: US$15,189 · 1st
- Time zone: UTC+04:00 (AMT)
- Area code: +374 10
- ISO 3166 code: AM-ER
- International airport: Zvartnots International Airport
- HDI (2023): 0.866 very high · 1st
- Website: www.yerevan.am

Yerevan (UK: /ˌjɛrəˈvæn/ YERR-ə-VAN, US: /-ˈvɑːn/, -VAHN; Armenian: Երևան (Note: Classical spelling: Երեւան; spelled Յերեվան between 1922 and 1940.) [jɛɾɛˈvɑn]; sometimes spelled Erevan) (Note: From the occasional local pronunciation [ɛɾɛˈvɑn], which is phonetically spelled Էրևան, Ērevan.) is the capital and largest city of Armenia, as well as one of the world's oldest continuously inhabited cities. Situated along the Hrazdan River, Yerevan is the administrative, cultural, and industrial centre of the country, as its primate city. It has been the capital since 1918, the fourteenth in the history of Armenia and the seventh located in or around the Ararat Plain. The city also serves as the seat of the Araratian Pontifical Diocese, which is the largest diocese of the Armenian Apostolic Church and one of the oldest dioceses in the world.

The history of Yerevan dates back to the 8th century BC, with the founding of the fortress of Erebuni in 782 BC by King Argishti I of Urartu at the western extreme of the Ararat Plain. Erebuni was "designed as a great administrative and religious centre, a fully royal capital." By the late ancient Armenian Kingdom, new capital cities were established and Yerevan declined in importance. The city was mostly depopulated by the Great Surgun of 1603–05, when the Safavid Empire forcibly deported hundreds of thousands of Armenians to Iran. In 1679, the city was mostly destroyed by an earthquake, and then rebuilt on a smaller scale. In 1828, Yerevan became part of the Russian Empire, which led to the repatriation of Armenians whose ancestors had been forcibly relocated in the 17th century. After World War I, Yerevan became the capital of the First Republic of Armenia as thousands of survivors of the Armenian genocide in the Ottoman Empire arrived in the area. The city expanded rapidly during the 20th century while Armenia was a part of the Soviet Union. In a few decades, Yerevan was transformed from a provincial town within the Russian Empire to Armenia's principal cultural, artistic, and industrial centre, as well as becoming the seat of national government.

With the growth of the Armenian economy, Yerevan has undergone major transformation. Much construction has been done throughout the city since the early 2000s, and retail outlets such as restaurants, shops, and street cafés, which were rare during Soviet times, have multiplied. As of 2011, the population of Yerevan was 1,060,138, just over 35% of Armenia's total population. By 2022, the population further increased to 1,086,677. Yerevan was named the 2012 World Book Capital by UNESCO. Yerevan is an associate member of Eurocities.

Of the notable landmarks of Yerevan, Erebuni Fortress is considered to be the birthplace of the city, the Katoghike Tsiranavor church is the oldest surviving church of Yerevan, and Saint Gregory Cathedral is the largest Armenian cathedral in the world. Tsitsernakaberd is the official memorial to the victims of the Armenian genocide. The city is home to several opera houses, theatres, museums, libraries, and other cultural institutions. Yerevan Opera Theatre is the main spectacle hall of the Armenian capital, the National Gallery of Armenia is the largest art museum in Armenia and shares a building with the History Museum of Armenia, and the Matenadaran contains one of the largest depositories of ancient books and manuscripts in the world.

== Etymology ==
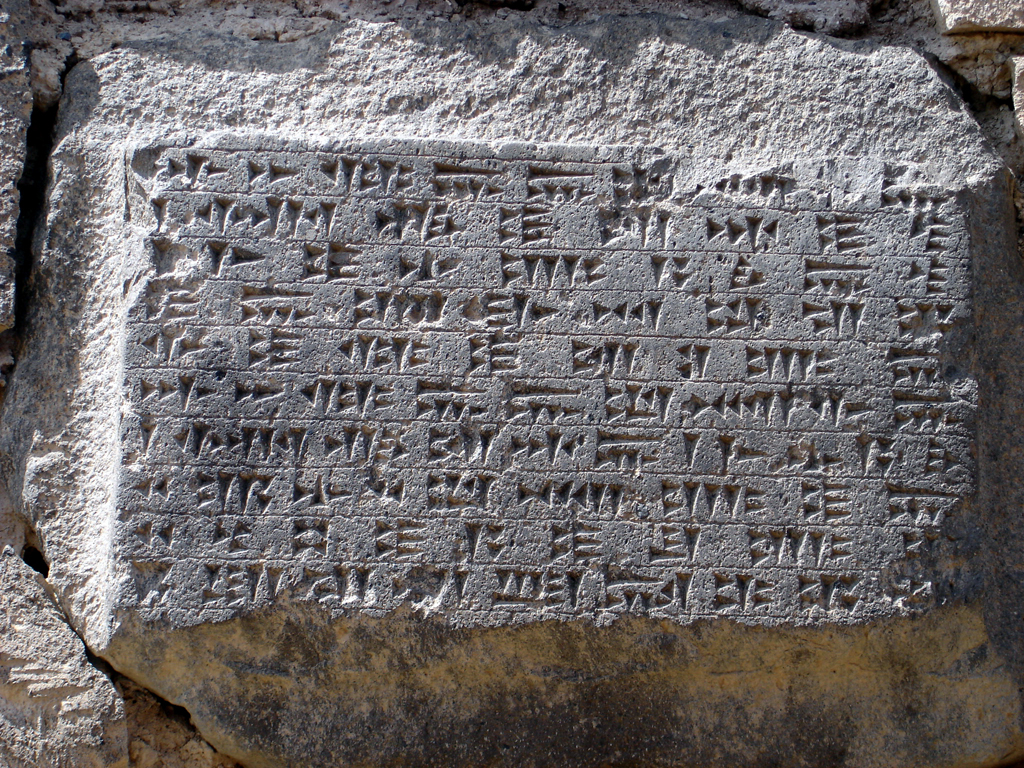
The "birth certificate" of Yerevan at the Erebuni Fortress—a cuneiform inscription left by King Argishti I of Urartu on a basalt stone slab about the foundation of the city in 782 BCE

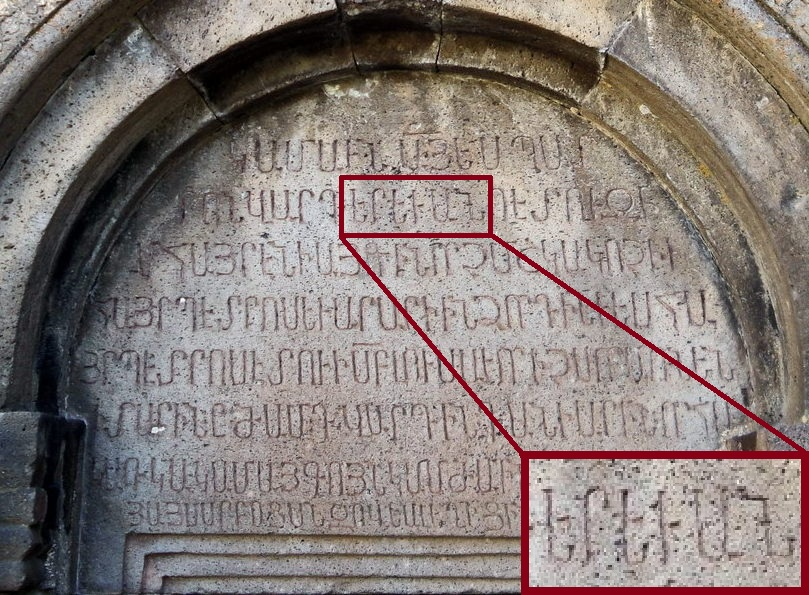
"YEREVAN" (ԵՐԵՒԱՆ) in an inscription from Kecharis, dating back to 1223

The exact origin of the name is unknown. One theory regarding the origin of Yerevan's name is the city was named after the Armenian king, Yervand (Orontes) IV, the last ruler of Armenia from the Orontid dynasty, and founder of the city of Yervandashat. However, it is likely that the city's name is derived from the Urartian military fortress of Erebuni, which was founded on the territory of modern-day Yerevan in 782 BC by Argishti I. "Erebuni" may derive from the Urartian word for "to take" or "to capture," meaning that the fortress's name could be interpreted as "capture," "conquest," or "victory." As elements of the Urartian language blended with that of the Armenian one, the name eventually evolved into Yerevan (Erebuni = Erevani = Erevan = Yerevan). Scholar Margarit Israelyan notes these changes when comparing inscriptions found on two cuneiform tablets at Erebuni:

The transcription of the second cuneiform bu [original emphasis] of the word was very essential in our interpretation as it is the Urartaean b that has been shifted to the Armenian v (b > v). The original writing of the inscription read «er-bu-ni»; therefore the prominent Armenianologist-orientalist Prof. G. A. Ghapantsian justly objected, remarking that the Urartu b changed to v at the beginning of the word (Biani > Van) or between two vowels (ebani > avan, Zabaha > Javakhk)....In other words b was placed between two vowels. The true pronunciation of the fortress-city was apparently Erebuny.

Early Christian Armenian chroniclers connected the origin of the city's name to the legend of Noah's Ark. After the ark had landed on Mount Ararat and the flood waters had receded, Noah, while looking in the direction of Yerevan, is said to have exclaimed "Yerevats!" ("it appeared!" in Armenian), from which originated the name Yerevan.

In the late medieval and early modern periods, when Yerevan was under Turkic and later Persian rule, the city was known in Persian as Iravân (Persian: ایروان). The city was officially known as Erivan (Russian: Эривань) under Russian rule during the 19th and early 20th centuries. The city was renamed back to Yerevan (Ереван) in 1936. Up until the mid-1970s the city's name was spelled Erevan more often than Yerevan in English sources.

== Symbols ==
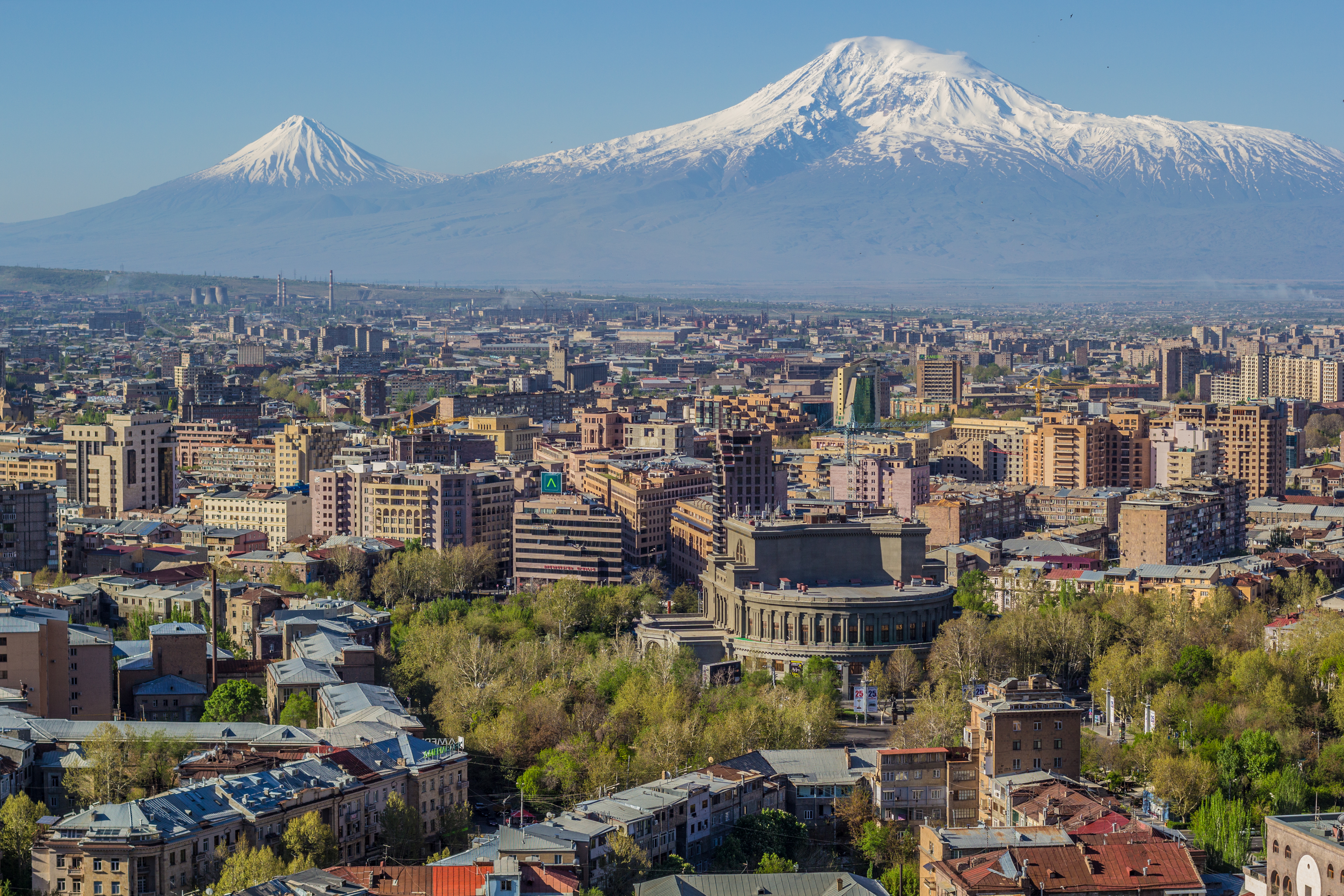
Mount Ararat, the national symbol of Armenia, dominates the Yerevan skyline.

The principal symbol of Yerevan is Mount Ararat, which is visible from any area in the capital. The seal of the city is a crowned lion on a pedestal with a shield that has a depiction of Mount Ararat on the upper part and half of an Armenian eternity sign on the bottom part. The emblem is a rectangular shield with a blue border.

On 27 September 2004, Yerevan adopted an anthem, "Erebuni-Yerevan", using lyrics written by Paruyr Sevak and set to music composed by Edgar Hovhannisyan. It was selected in a competition for a new anthem and new flag that would best represent the city. The chosen flag has a white background with the city's seal in the middle, surrounded by twelve small red triangles that symbolise the twelve historic capitals of Armenia. The flag includes the three colours of the Armenian National flag. The lion is portrayed on the orange background with blue edging.

== History ==
=== Pre-history and pre-classical era ===
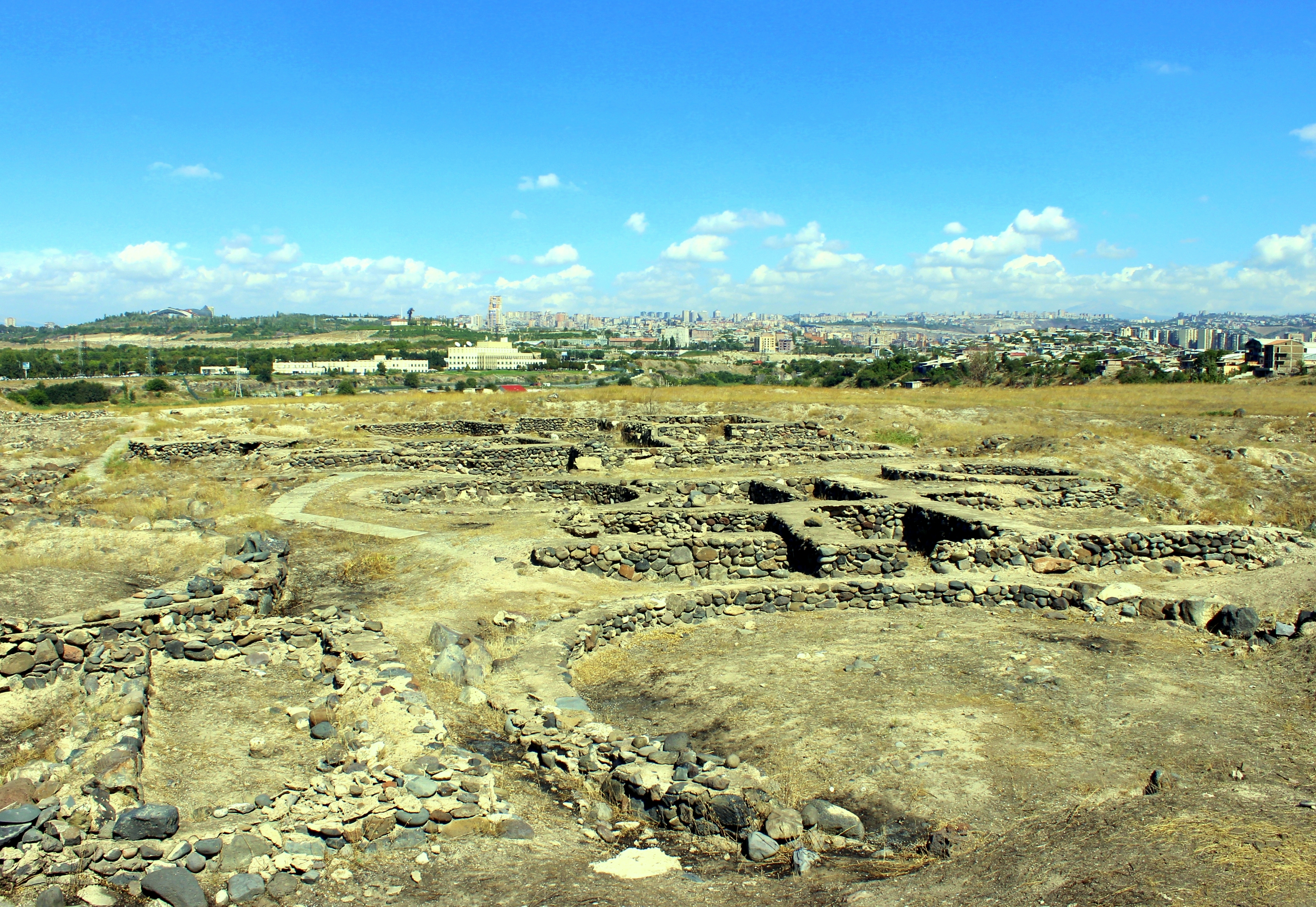
Foundations of Shengavit historical site (site settled 3200 BC cal to 2500 BC cal)

The territory of Yerevan has been inhabited since approximately the 2nd half of the 4th millennium BC. The southern part of the city currently known as Shengavit has been populated since at least 3200 BC, during the period of Kura–Araxes culture of the early Bronze Age. The first excavations at the Shengavit historical site was conducted between 1936 and 1938 under the guidance of archaeologist Yevgeny Bayburdyan. After two decades, archaeologist Sandro Sardarian resumed the excavations starting from 1958 until 1983. The 3rd phase of the excavations started in 2000, under the guidance of archaeologist Hakob Simonyan. In 2009, Simonyan was joined by Mitchell S. Rothman from the Widener University of Pennsylvania. Together they conducted three series of excavations in 2009, 2010, and 2012 respectively. During the process, a full stratigraphic column to bedrock was reached, showing there to be 8 or 9 distinct stratigraphic levels. These levels cover a time between 3200 BC and 2500 BC. Evidences of later use of the site, possibly until 2200 BC, were also found. The excavation process revealed a series of large round buildings with square adjoining rooms and minor round buildings. A series of ritual installations was discovered in 2010 and 2012.

=== Erebuni ===
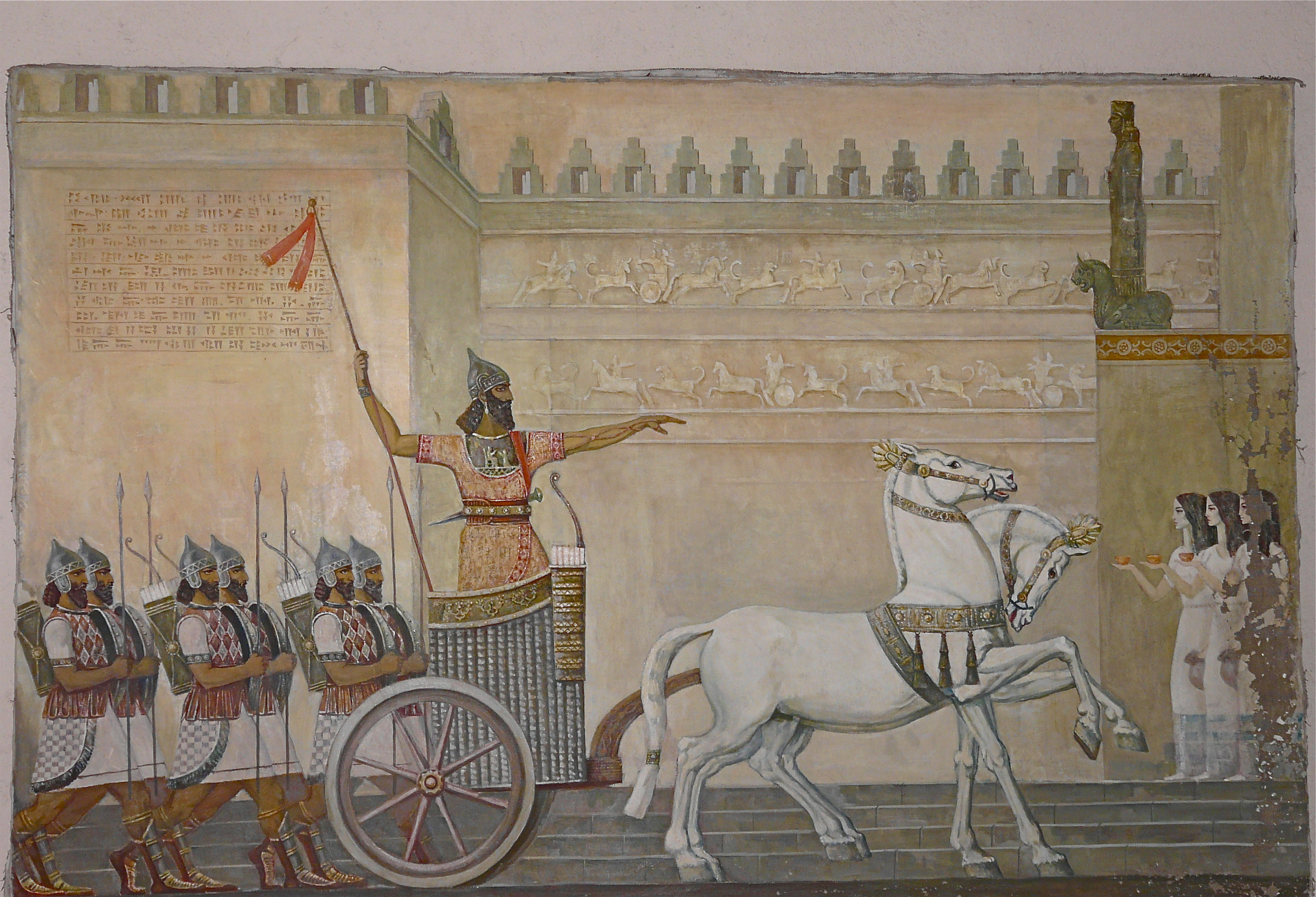
Painting showing the founding of Yerevan by Argishti I in 782 BC (Erebuni Museum)

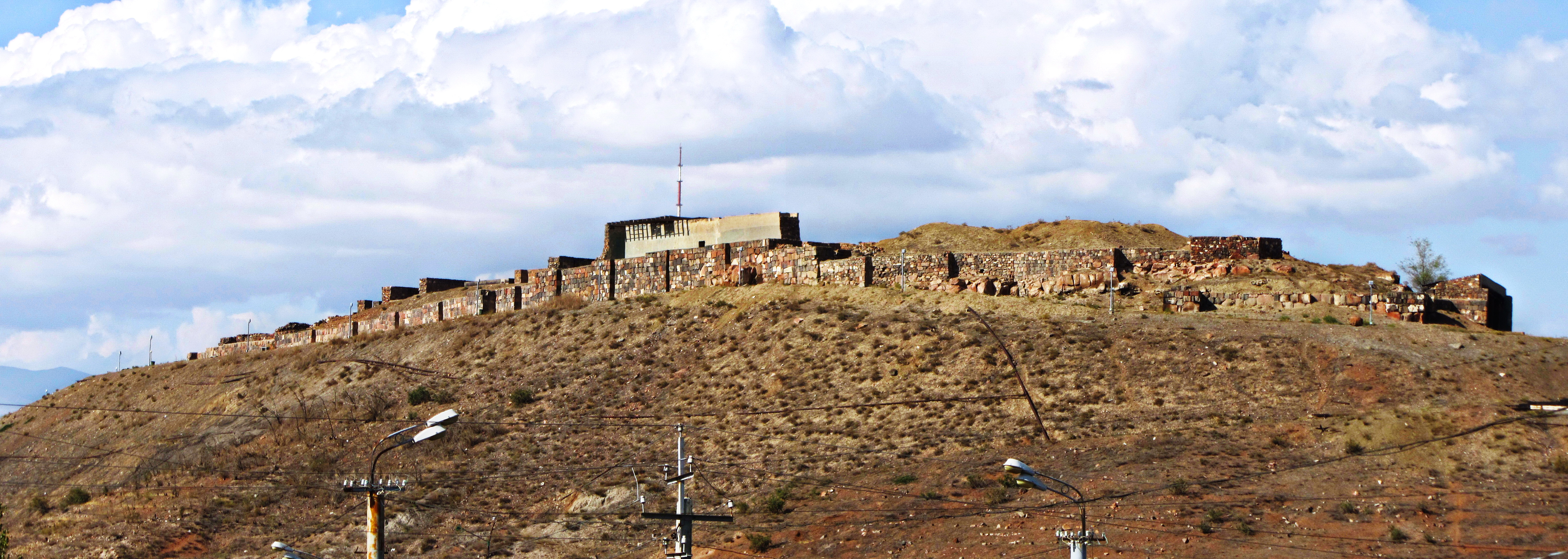
Erebuni Fortress, founded by King Argishti I in 782 BC

The ancient kingdom of Urartu was formed in the 9th century BC by King Arame in the basin of Lake Van of the Armenian Highland, including the territory of modern-day Yerevan. Archaeological evidence, such as a cuneiform inscription, indicates that the Urartian military fortress of Erebuni was founded in 782 BC by the orders of King Argishti I at the site of modern-day Yerevan, to serve as a fort and citadel guarding against attacks from the north Caucasus. The cuneiform inscription found at Erebuni Fortress reads:

By the greatness of the God Khaldi, Argishti, son of Menua, built this mighty stronghold and proclaimed it Erebuni for the glory of Biainili [Urartu] and to instill fear among the king's enemies. Argishti says, "The land was a desert, before the great works I accomplished upon it. By the greatness of Khaldi, Argishti, son of Menua, is a mighty king, king of Biainili, and ruler of Tushpa."[Van].

During the height of the Urartian power, irrigation canals and artificial reservoirs were built in Erebuni and its surrounding territories.

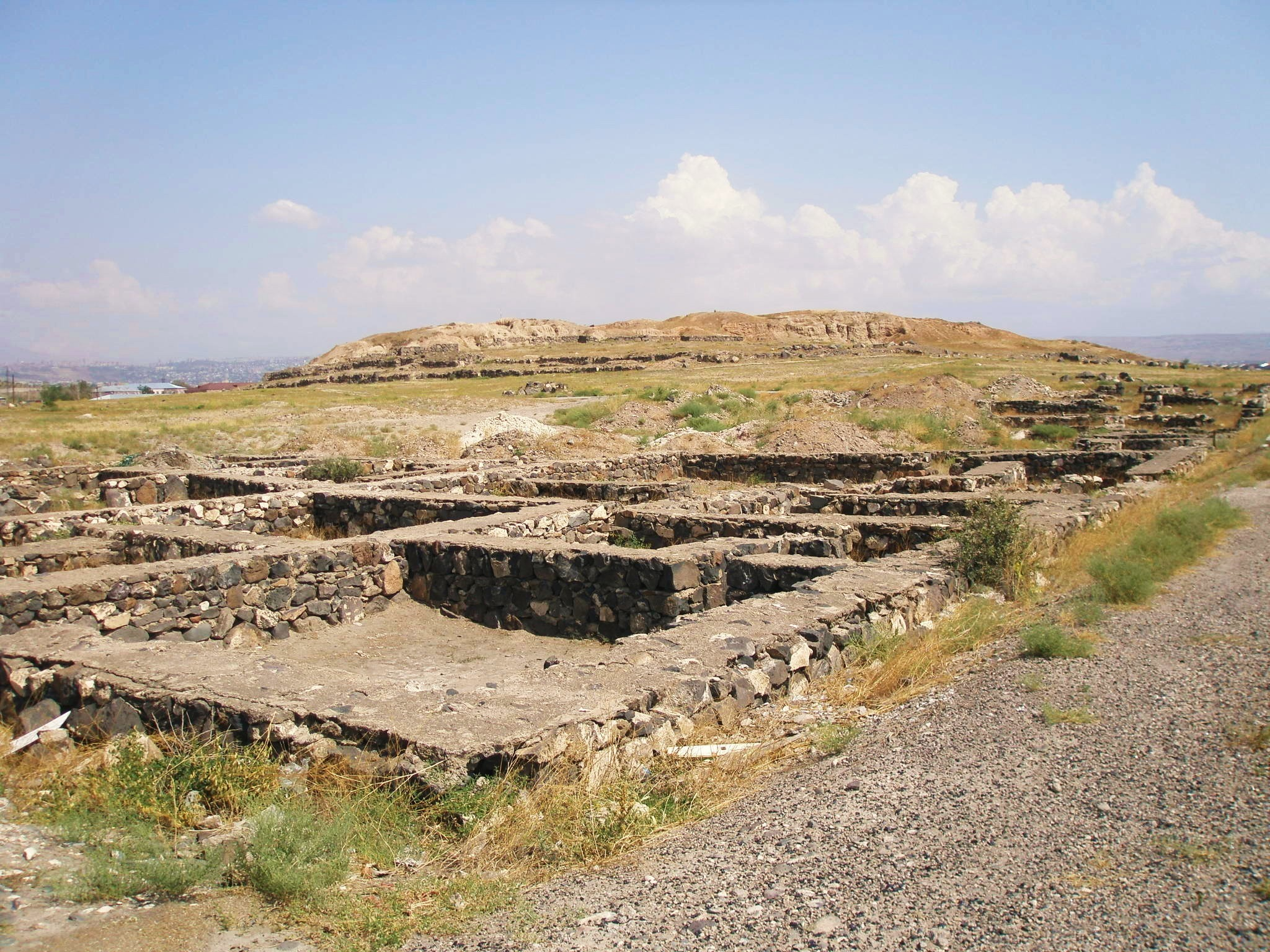
Foundations of Teišebaini building commenced in mid-7th century BC

In the mid-7th century BC, the city of Teišebaini was built by Rusa II of Urartu, around 7 kilometres (4.3 miles) west of Erebuni Fortress. It was fortified on a hill -currently known as Karmir Blur within Shengavit District of Yerevan- to protect the eastern borders of Urartu from the barbaric Cimmerians and Scythians. During excavations, the remains of a governors palace that contained a hundred and twenty rooms spreading across more than 40,000 m^{2} (10 acres) was found, along with a citadel dedicated to the Urartian god Teisheba. The construction of the city of Teišebaini, as well as the palace and the citadel was completed by the end of the 7th century BC, during the reign of Rusa III. However, Teišebaini was destroyed by an alliance of Medes and the Scythians in 585 BC.

=== Median and Achaemenid rules ===
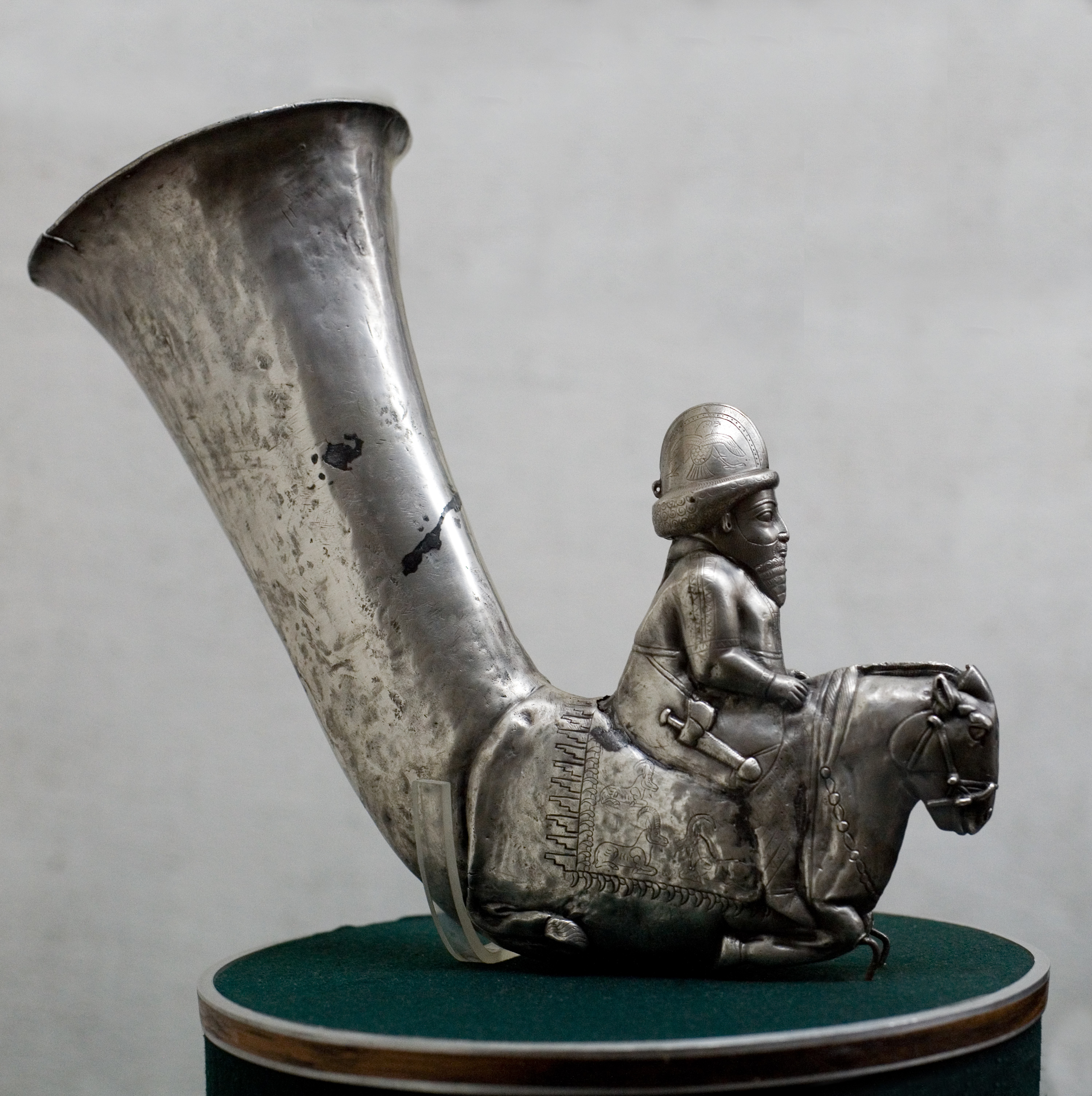
Achaemenid rhyton from Erebuni

In 590 BC, following the fall of the Kingdom of Urartu at the hands of the Iranian Medes, Erebuni along with the Armenian Highlands became part of the Median Empire.

However, in 550 BC, the Median Empire was conquered by Cyrus the Great, and Erebuni became part of the Achaemenid Empire. Between 522 BC and 331 BC, Erebuni was one of the main centres of the Satrapy of Armenia, a region controlled by the Orontid dynasty as one of the satrapies of the Achaemenid Empire. The Satrapy of Armenia was divided into two parts: the northern part and the southern part, with the cities of Erebuni (Yerevan) and Tushpa (Van) as their centres, respectively.

Coins issued in 478 BC, along with many other items found in the Erebuni Fortress, reveal the importance of Erebuni as a major centre for trade under Achaemenid rule.

=== Ancient Kingdom of Armenia ===
After Alexander the Great's victory over the Achaemenid Empire, the Orontid rulers of the Armenian satrapy achieved independence as a result of the Battle of Gaugamela in 331 BC, founding the Kingdom of Armenia. With the establishment of new cities such as Armavir, Zarehavan, Bagaran and Yervandashat, the importance of Erebuni gradually declined.

With the rise of the Artaxiad dynasty of Armenia who seized power in 189 BC, the Kingdom of Armenia greatly expanded to include major territories of Asia Minor, Atropatene, Iberia, Phoenicia and Syria. The Artaxiads considered Erebuni and Tushpa as cities of Persian heritage. Consequently, new cities and commercial centres were built by Kings Artaxias I, Artavasdes I and Tigranes the Great. Thus, with the dominance of cities such as Artaxata and Tigranocerta, Erebuni significantly lost its importance as a central city.

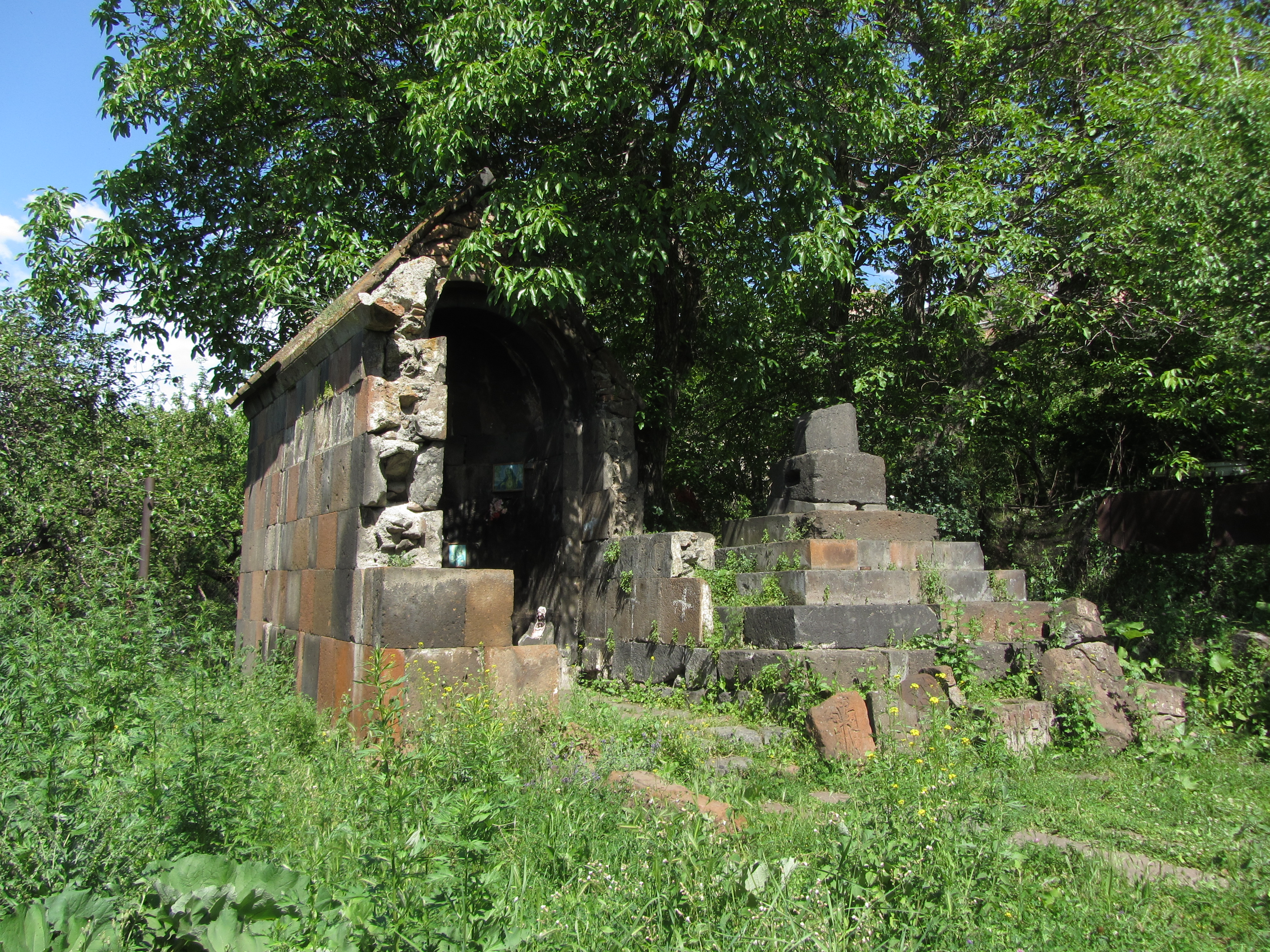
The ruins of the 4th-century Holy Mother of God Chapel in Avan, north of Yerevan

Under the rule of the Arsacid dynasty of Armenia (54–428 AD), many other cities around Erebuni including Vagharshapat and Dvin flourished. Consequently, Erebuni was completely neutralised, losing its role as an economic and strategic centre of Armenia. During the period of the Arsacid kings, Erebuni was only recorded in a Manichaean text of the 3rd century, where it is mentioned that one of the disciples of the prophet Mani founded a Manichaean community near the Christian community in Erebuni.

According to the medieval Armenian geography Ashkharhatsuyts, Erebuni was part of the canton (gawaṙ) of Kotayk (not to be confused with the current Kotayk Province) of the province of Ayrarat, within Armenia Major.

Armenia became a Christian nation in the early 4th century AD, during the reign of the Arsacid king Tiridates III.

=== Sasanian and Roman periods ===
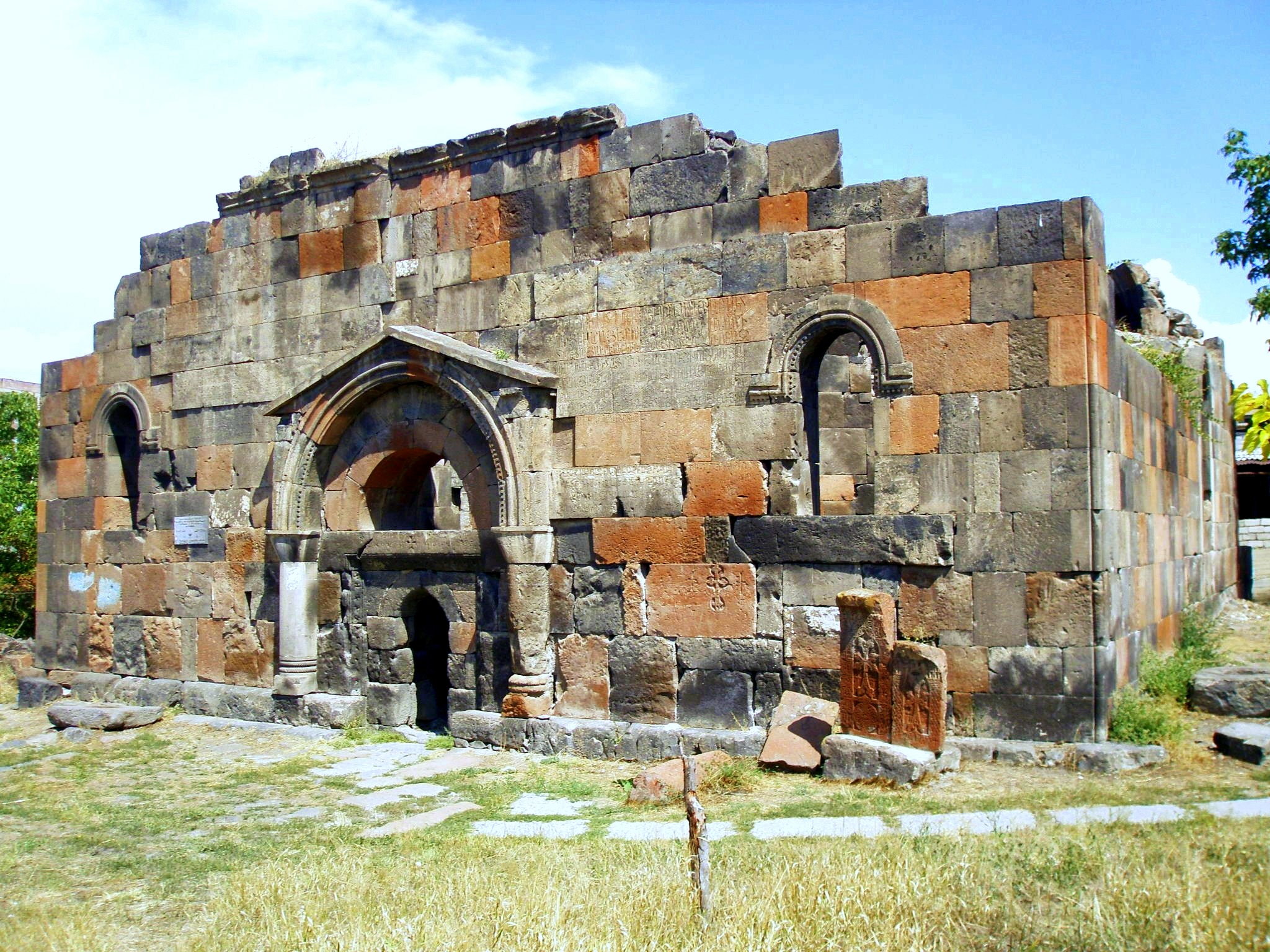
Katoghike Tsiranavor Church of Avan, 6th century

Following the partition of Armenia by the Byzantine and Sasanian empires in 387 and in 428, Erebuni and the entire territory of Eastern Armenia came under the rule of Sasanian Persia. The Armenian territories formed the province of Persian Armenia within the Sasanian Empire.

Due to the diminished role of Erebuni, as well as the absence of proper historical data, much of the city's history under the Sasanian rule is unknown.

In 587, during the reign of emperor Maurice, Yerevan and much of Armenia came under Roman administration after the Romans defeated the Sassanid Persian Empire at the battle of the Blarathon. Soon after, Katoghike Tsiranavor Church in Avan was built between 595 and 602. Despite being partly damaged during the 1679 earthquake), it is the oldest surviving church within modern Yerevan city limits.

The province of Persian Armenia (also known as Persarmenia) lasted until 646, when the province was dissolved with the Muslim conquest of Persia.

=== Arab Islamic invasion ===
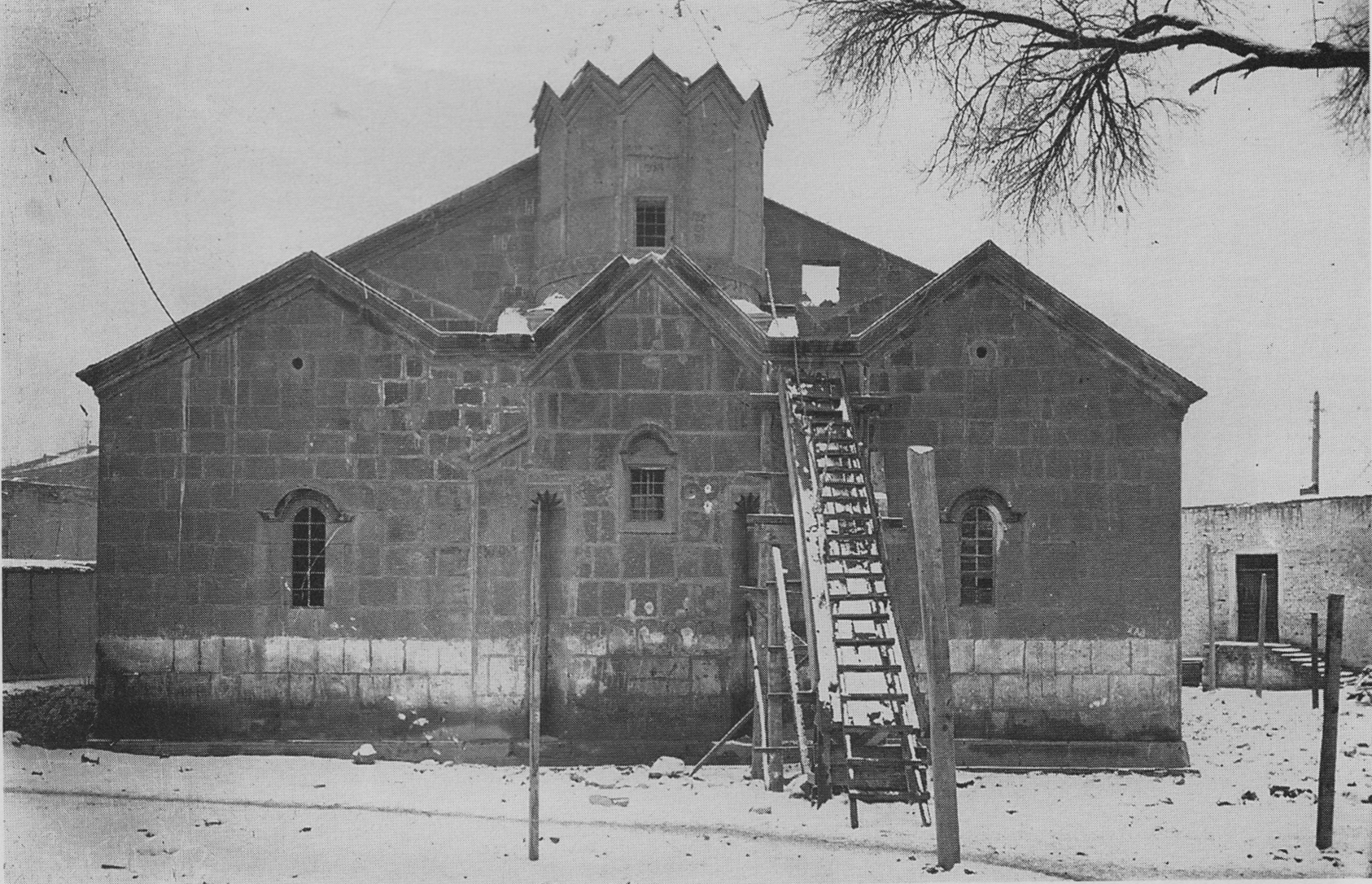
The 7th-century church of the Holy Mother of God, demolished in 1936

In 658 AD, at the height of the Arab Islamic invasions, Erebuni-Yerevan was conquered during the Muslim conquest of Persia, as it was part of Persian-ruled Armenia. The city became part of the Emirate of Armenia under the Umayyad Caliphate. The city of Dvin was the centre of the newly created emirate. Starting from this period, as a result of the developing trade activities with the Arabs, the Armenian territories had gained strategic importance as a crossroads for the Arab caravan routes passing between Europe and India through the Arab-controlled Ararat Plain of Armenia. Most probably, "Erebuni" has become known as "Yerevan" since at least the 7th century AD.

=== Bagratid Armenia ===
After two centuries of Islamic rule over Armenia, the Bagratid prince Ashot I of Armenia led the revolution against the Abbasid Caliphate. Ashot I liberated Yerevan in 850, and was recognised as the Prince of Princes of Armenia by the Abbasid Caliph al-Musta'in in 862. Ashot was later crowned King of Armenia through the consent of Caliph al-Mu'tamid in 885. During the rule of the Bagratuni dynasty of Armenia between 885 and 1045, Yerevan was relatively a secure part of the Kingdom before falling to the Byzantines.

However, Yerevan did not have any strategic role during the reign of the Bagratids, who developed many other cities of Ayrarat, such as Shirakavan, Dvin, and Ani.

=== Seljuk period, Zakarid Armenia and Mongol rule ===
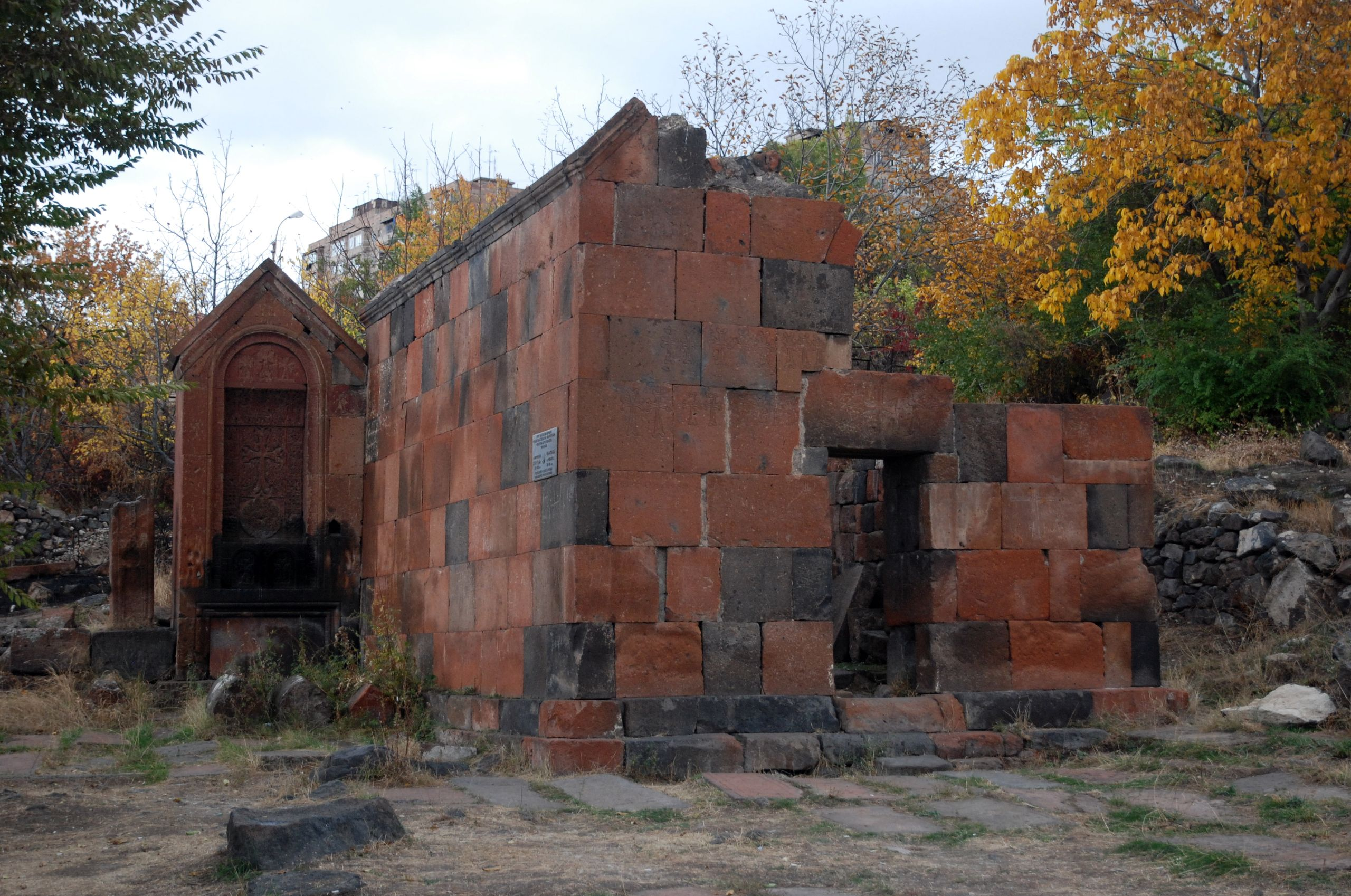
The remains of Surp Hovhannes Chapel, dating back to the 12–13th centuries

After a brief Byzantine rule over Armenia between 1045 and 1064, the invading Seljuks—led by Tughril and later by his successor Alp Arslan—ruled over the entire region, including Yerevan. However, with the establishment of the Zakarid Principality of Armenia in 1201 under the Georgian protectorate, the Armenian territories of Yerevan and Lori had significantly grown. After the Mongols captured Ani in 1236, Armenia turned into a Mongol protectorate as part of the Ilkhanate, and the Zakarids became vassals to the Mongols. After the fall of the Ilkhanate in the mid-14th century, the Zakarid princes ruled over Lori, Shirak and the Ararat Plain until 1360 when they fell to the invading Turkic tribes.

=== Aq Qoyunlu and Kara Koyunlu tribes ===
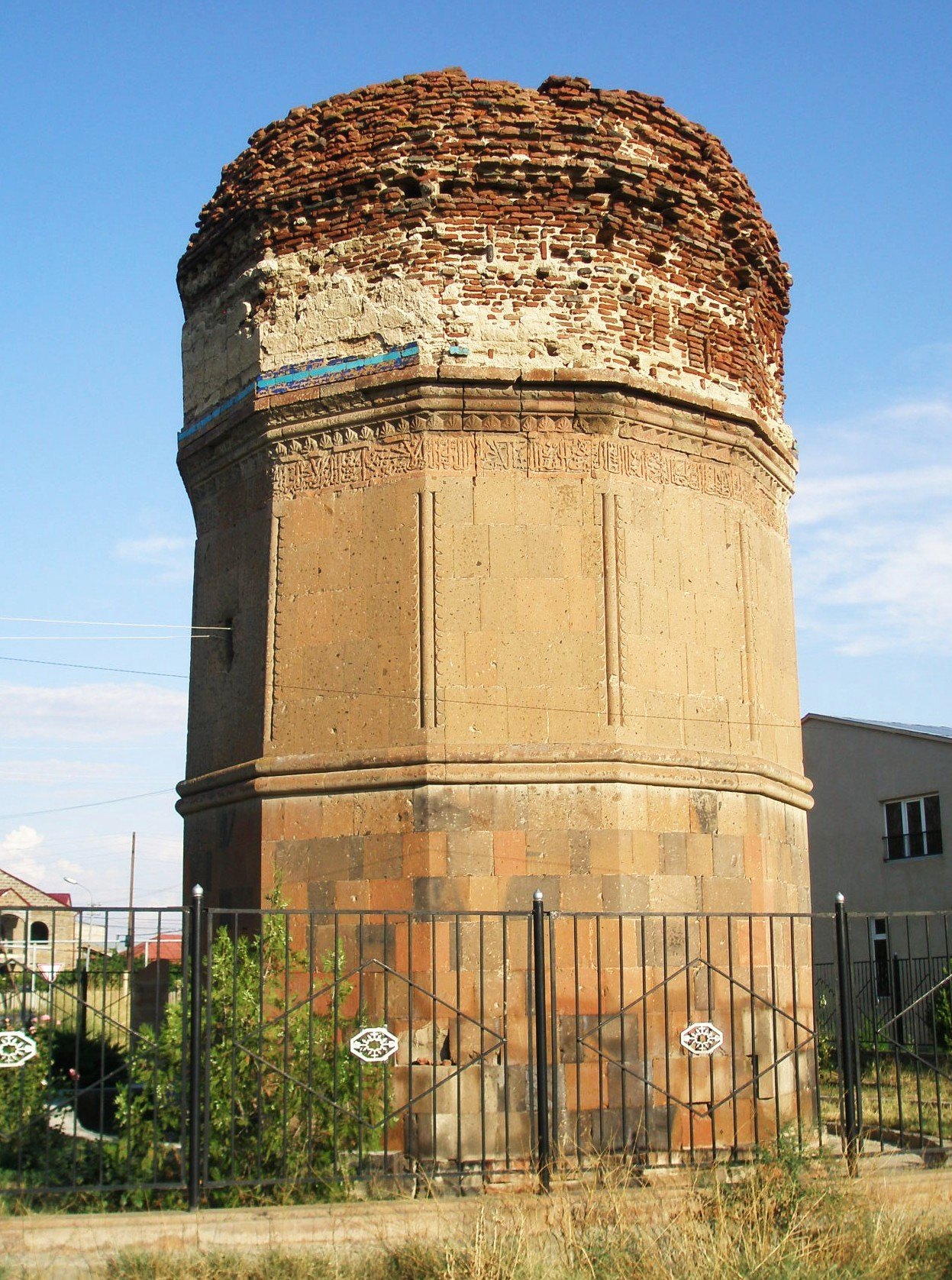
The Mausoleum of Kara Koyunlu emirs in Argavand, near Yerevan

During the last quarter of the 14th century, the Aq Qoyunlu Sunni Oghuz Turkic tribe took over Armenia, including Yerevan. In 1400, Timur invaded Armenia and Georgia, and captured more than 60,000 of the survived local people as slaves. Many districts including Yerevan were depopulated.

In 1410, Armenia fell under the control of the Kara Koyunlu Shia Oghuz Turkic tribe. According to the Armenian historian Thomas of Metsoph, although the Kara Koyunlu levied heavy taxes against the Armenians, the early years of their rule were relatively peaceful and some reconstruction of towns took place. The Kara Koyunlus made Yerevan the centre of the newly formed Chukhur Saad administrative territory. The territory was named after a Turkic leader known as Emir Saad.

However, this peaceful period was shattered with the rise of Qara Iskander between 1420 and 1436, who reportedly made Armenia a "desert" and subjected it to "devastation and plunder, to slaughter, and captivity". The wars of Iskander and his eventual defeat against the Timurids, invited further destruction in Armenia, as many more Armenians were taken captive and sold into slavery and the land was subjected to outright pillaging, forcing many of them to leave the region.

Following the fall of the Armenian Kingdom of Cilicia in 1375, the seat of the Armenian Church was transferred from Sis back to Vagharshapat near Yerevan in 1441. Thus, Yerevan became the main economic, cultural and administrative centre in Armenia.

=== Iranian rule ===
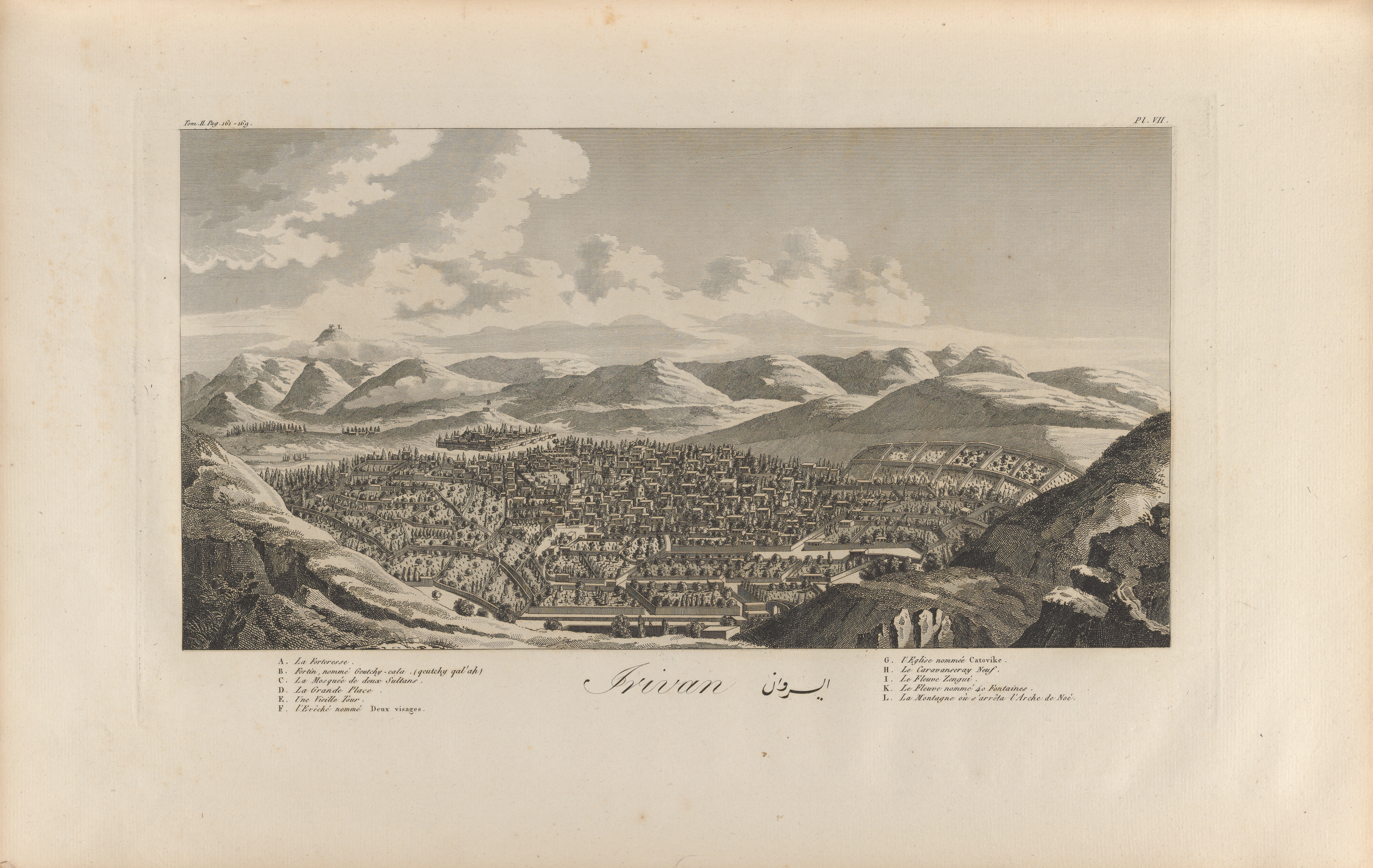
An illustration of Yerevan by French traveler Jean Chardin in 1673 while he was travelling through the Safavid Empire

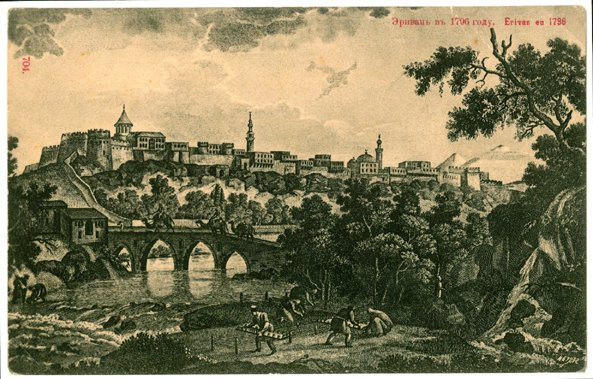
Yerevan in 1796 in the Qajar era, by G. Sergeevich. An Armenian church can be seen on the left and a Persian mosque on the right.

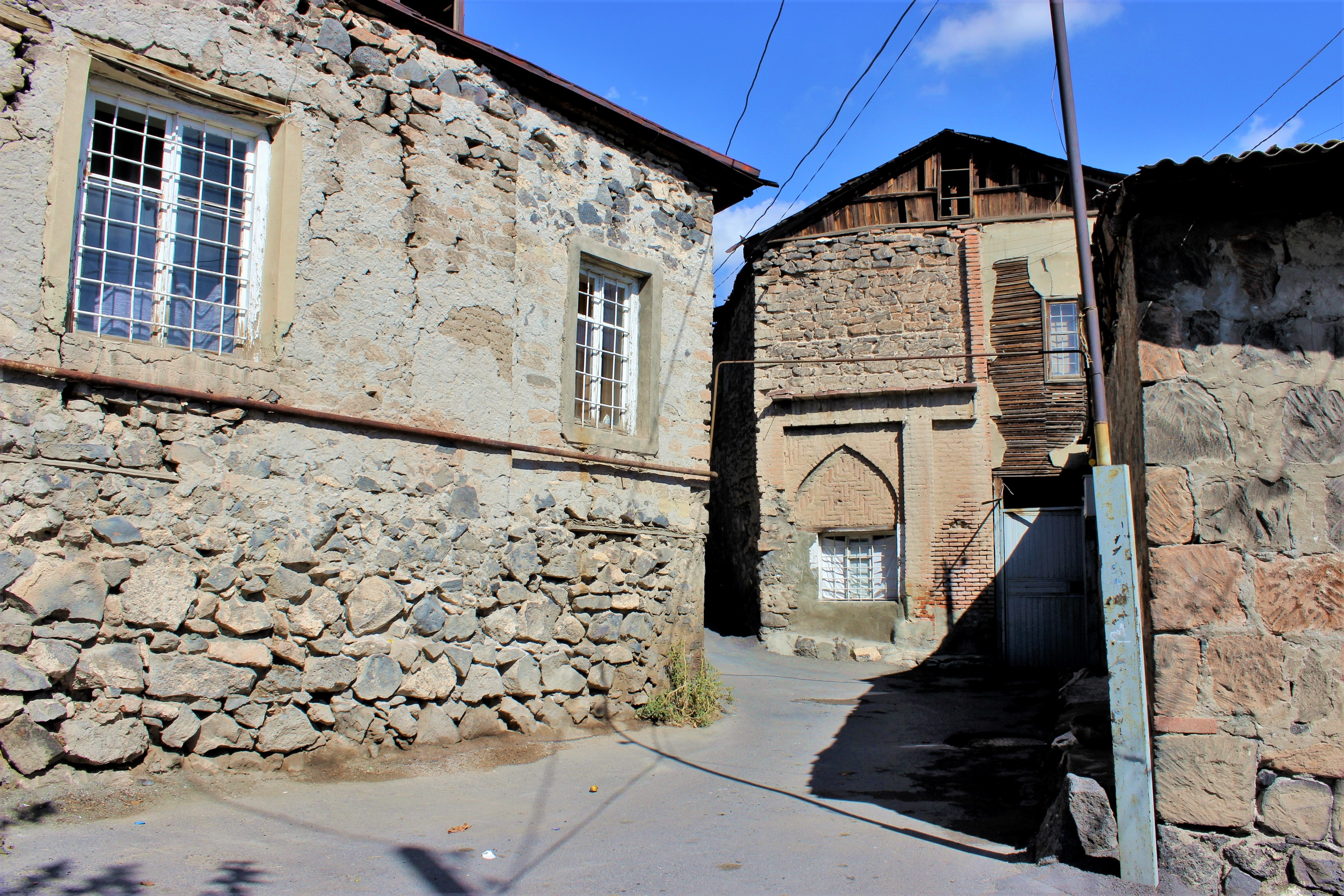
Kond, a historic neighbourhood of Yerevan, formed during the 17th century

In 1501–02, most of the Eastern Armenian territories including Yerevan were swiftly conquered by the emerging Safavid dynasty of Iran led by Shah Ismail I. Soon after in 1502, Yerevan became the centre of the Erivan Province, a new administrative territory of Iran formed by the Safavids. For the following 3 centuries, it remained, with brief intermissions, under the Iranian rule. Due to its strategic significance, Yerevan was initially often fought over, and passed back and forth, between the dominion of the rivalling Iranian and Ottoman Empire, until it permanently became controlled by the Safavids. In 1555, Iran had secured its legitimate possession over Yerevan with the Ottomans through the Treaty of Amasya.

In 1582–1583, the Ottomans led by Serdar Ferhad Pasha took brief control over Yerevan. Ferhad Pasha managed to build the Erivan Fortress on the ruins of one thousand-years old ancient Armenian fortress, on the shores of Hrazdan river. However, Ottoman control ended in 1604 when the Persians regained Yerevan as a result of first Ottoman-Safavid War.

Shah Abbas I of Persia who ruled between 1588 and 1629, ordered the deportation of hundreds of thousands of Armenians including citizens from Yerevan to mainland Persia. As a consequence, Yerevan significantly lost its Armenian population who had declined to 20%, while Muslims including Persians, Turks, Kurds and Tatars gained dominance with around 80% of the city's population. Muslims were either sedentary, semi-sedentary, or nomadic. Armenians mainly occupied the Kond neighbourhood of Yerevan and the rural suburbs around the city. However, the Armenians dominated over various professions and trade in the area and were of great economic significance to the Persian administration.

During the second Ottoman-Safavid War, Ottoman troops under the command of Sultan Murad IV conquered the city on 8 August 1635. Returning in triumph to Constantinople, he opened the "Yerevan Kiosk" (Revan Köşkü) in Topkapı Palace in 1636. However, Iranian troops commanded by Shah Safi retook Yerevan on 1 April 1636. As a result of the Treaty of Zuhab in 1639, the Iranians reconfirmed their control over Eastern Armenia, including Yerevan. On 7 June 1679, a devastating earthquake razed the city to the ground.

In 1724, the Erivan Fortress was besieged by the Ottoman army. After a period of resistance, the fortress fell to the Turks. As a result of the Ottoman invasion, the Erivan Province of the Safavids was dissolved.

Following a brief period of Ottoman rule over Eastern Armenia between 1724 and 1736, and as a result of the fall of the Safavid dynasty in 1736, Yerevan along with the adjacent territories became part of the newly formed administrative territory of Erivan Khanate under the Afsharid dynasty of Iran, which encompassed an area of 15,000 square kilometres (5,800 square miles). The Afsharids controlled Eastern Armenia from the mid-1730s until the 1790s. Following the fall of the Afsharids, the Qajar dynasty of Iran took control of Eastern Armenia until 1828, when the region was conquered by the Russian Empire after their victory over the Qajars that resulted in the Treaty of Turkmenchay of 1828.

=== Russian rule ===
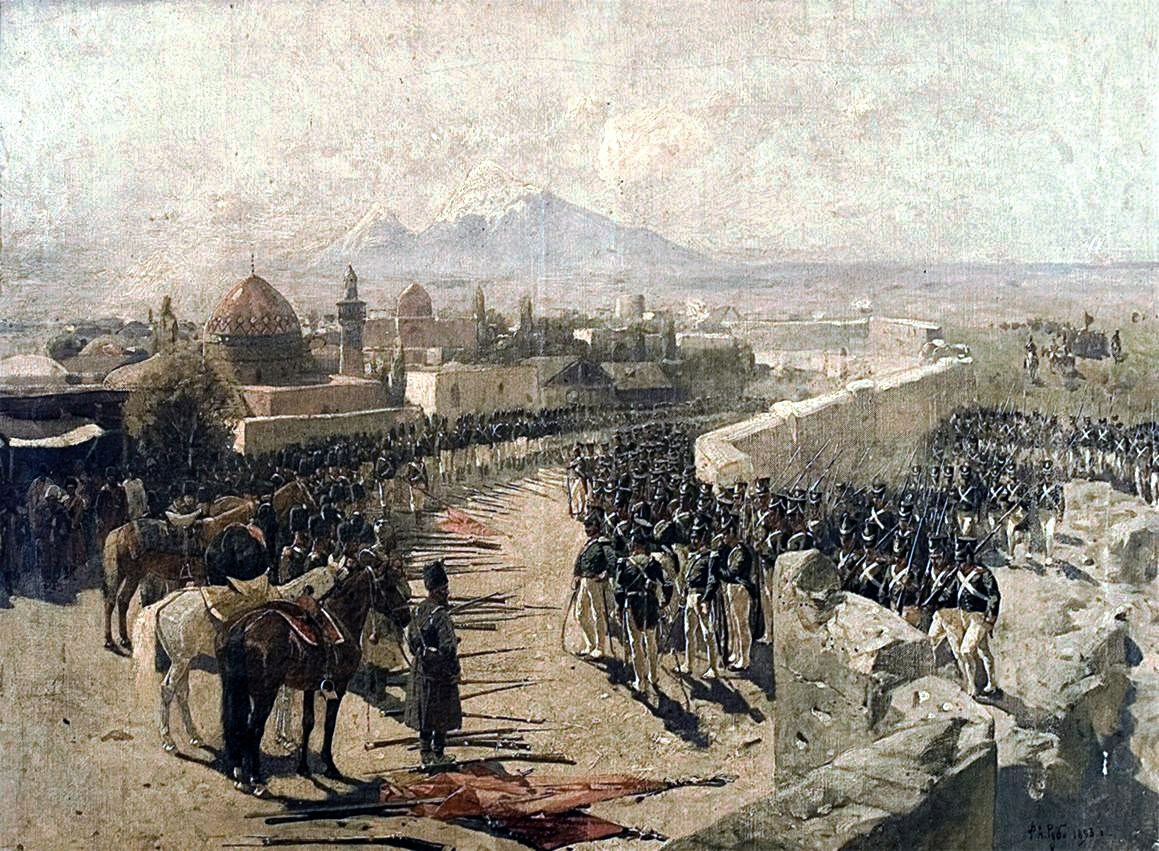
Franz Roubaud's 1893 painting of the Erivan Fortress siege of 1827 by the Russian forces during the Russo-Persian War (1826–1828)

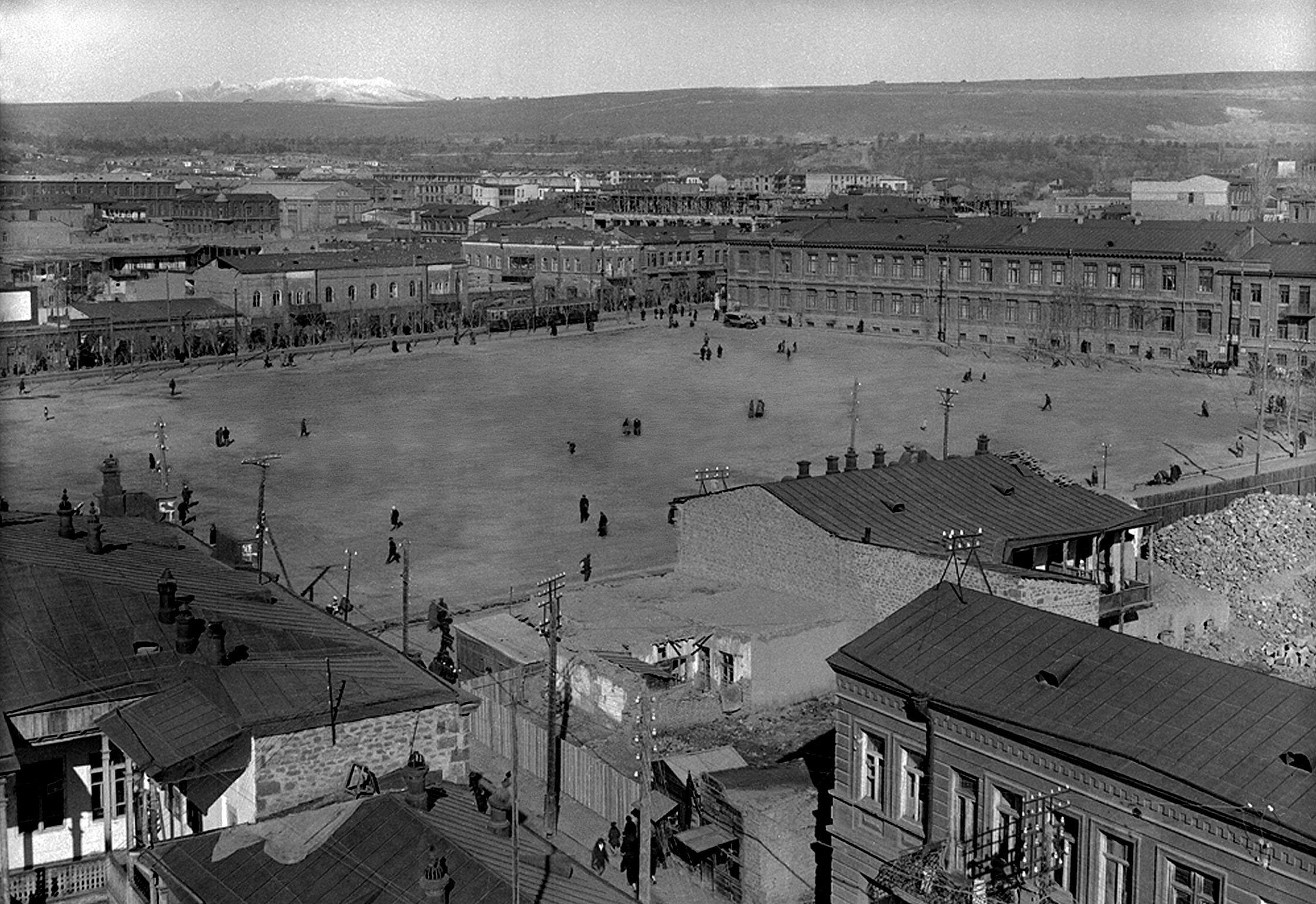
The Main Square of Yerevan, 1916

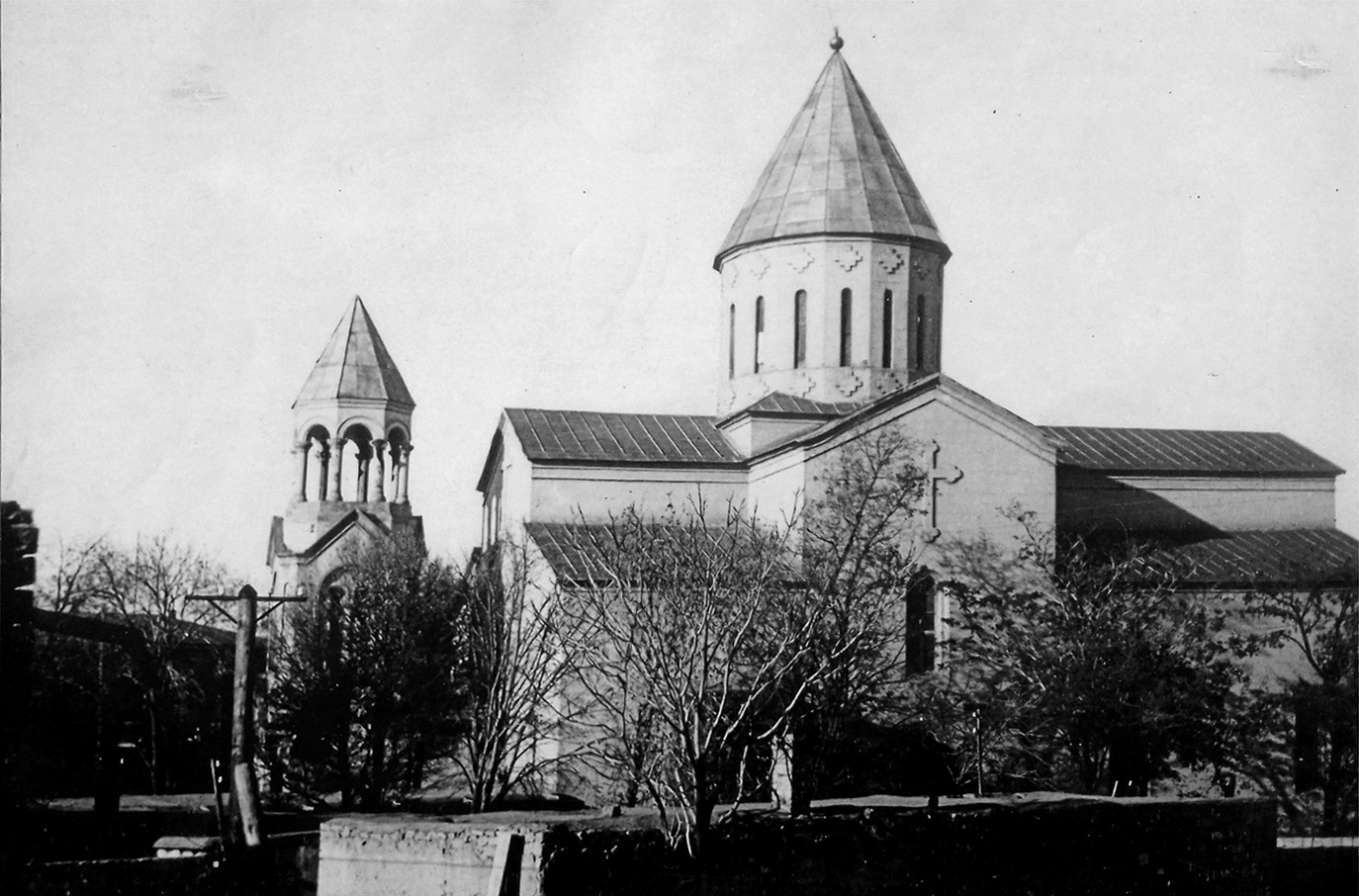
Saint Gregory Church, opened in 1900 (later destroyed in 1939)

During the second Russo-Persian War of the 19th century, the Russo-Persian War of 1826–1828, Yerevan was captured by Russian troops under general Ivan Paskevich on 1 October 1827. It was formally ceded by the Iranians in 1828, following the Treaty of Turkmenchay. After 3 centuries of Iranian occupation, Yereven along with the rest of Eastern Armenia designated as the "Armenian Oblast", became part of the Russian Empire, a period that would last until the collapse of the Empire in 1917.

Although not mentioned specifically by name, article XV of the Turkmenchay treaty was intended solely for the repatriation of those Armenians whose ancestors had been forcibly relocated to Iran in the early 17th century during the Safavid period. The Russians sponsored the resettlement process of the Armenian population from Persia and Turkey and spread announcements in Armenian villages. Due to the resettlement, the percentage of the Armenian population of Yerevan increased from 28% to 53.8%. The resettlement was intended to create Russian power bridgehead in the Middle East. In 1829, Armenian repatriates from Persia were resettled in the city and a new quarter was built.

Yerevan served as the seat of the newly formed Armenian Oblast between 1828 and 1840. By the time of Nicholas I's visit in 1837, Yerevan had become an uezd ("county"). In 1840, the Armenian Oblast was dissolved and its territory incorporated into a new larger province; the Georgia-Imeretia Governorate. In 1850 the territory of the former oblast was reorganised into the Erivan Governorate, covering an area of 28,000 square kilometres (11,000 square miles). Yerevan served as the centre of the newly established governorate until 1917.

At that period, Yerevan was a small town with narrow roads and alleys, including the central quarter of Shahar, the Ghantar commercial centre, and the residential neighbourhoods of Kond, Dzoragyugh, Nork and Shentagh. During the 1840s and the 1850s, many schools were opened in the city. However, the first major plan of Yerevan was adopted in 1856, during which, Saint Hripsime and Saint Gayane women's colleges were founded and the English Park was opened. In 1863, the Astafyan Street was redeveloped and opened. In 1874, Zacharia Gevorkian opened Yerevan's first printing house, while the first theatre opened its doors in 1879.

On 1 October 1879, Yerevan was granted the status of a city through a decree issued by Alexander II of Russia. In 1881, The Yerevan Teachers' Seminary and the Yerevan Brewery were opened, followed by the Tairyan's wine and brandy factory in 1887. Other factories for alcoholic beverages and mineral water were opened during the 1890s. The monumental church of Saint Gregory the Illuminator was opened in 1900. Electricity and telephone lines were introduced to the city in 1907 and 1913 respectively. When British traveller H. F. B. Lynch visited Yerevan in 1893–1894, he considered it an Oriental city. However, this started to change in the first decade of the 20th century, in the penultimate decade of Imperial Russian rule, when the city grew and altered dramatically. In general, Yerevan rapidly grew under Russian rule, both economically and politically. Old buildings were torn down and new buildings of European style were erected.

At the beginning of the 20th century, Yerevan city's population was over 29,000. In 1902, a railway line linked Yerevan with Alexandropol, Tiflis and Julfa. In the same year, Yerevan's first public library was opened. In 1905, the grandnephew of Napoleon I; prince Louis Joseph Jérôme Napoléon (1864–1932) was appointed as governor of Yerevan province. In 1913, for the first time in the city, a telephone line with eighty subscribers became operational.

=== Brief independence ===
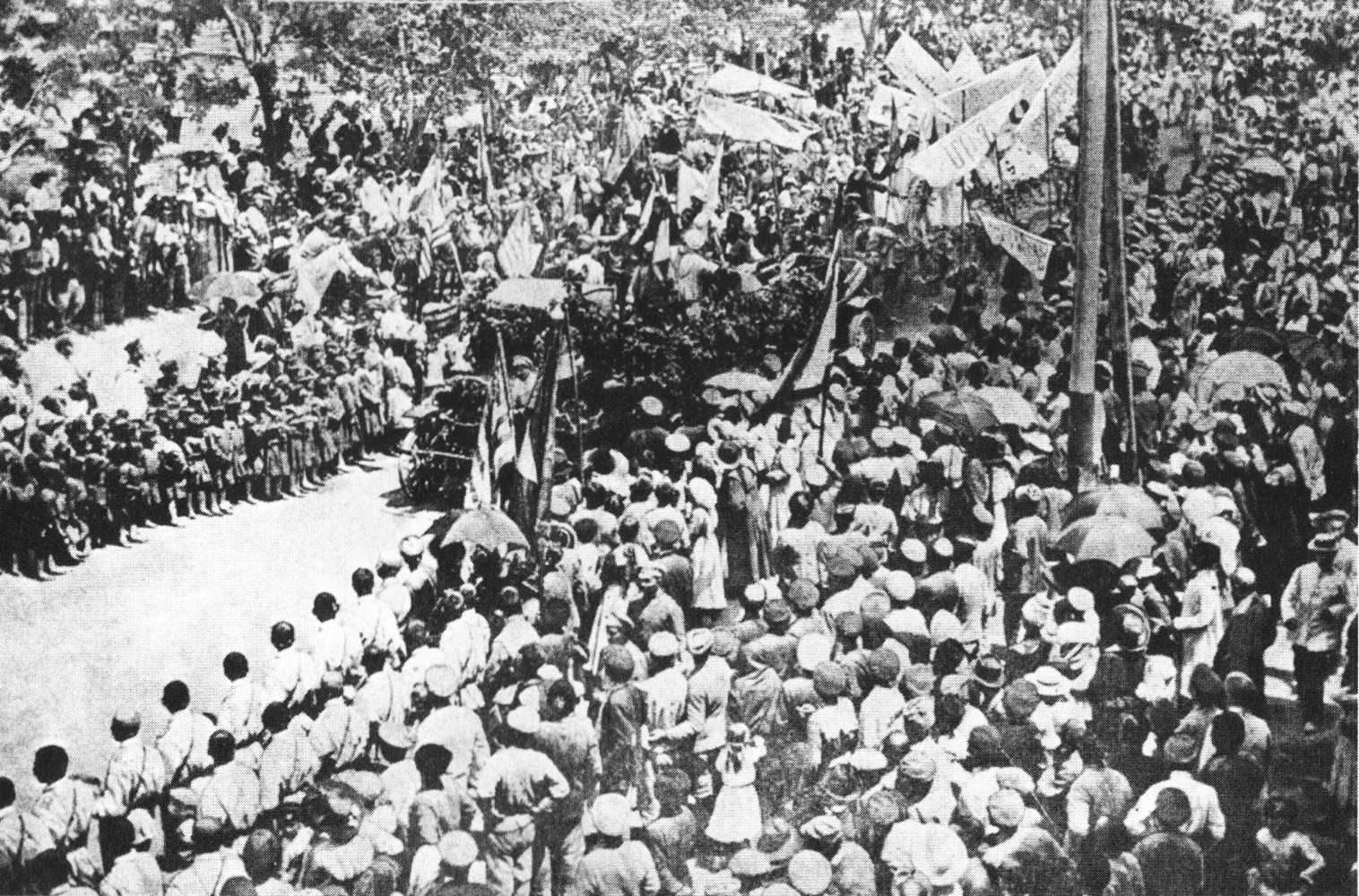
Celebration of the first anniversary of the First Republic of Armenia in 1919

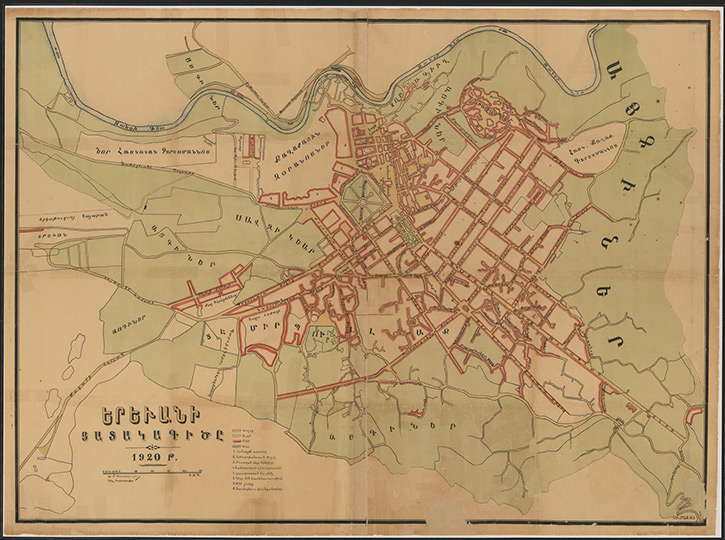
Map of Yerevan in 1920, made before the Soviet reconstruction of the city by Alexander Tamanian

At the beginning of the 20th century, Yerevan was a small city with a population of 30,000. In 1917, the Russian Empire ended with the October Revolution. In the aftermath, Armenian, Georgian and Muslim leaders of Transcaucasia united to form the Transcaucasian Federation and proclaimed Transcaucasia's secession.

The Federation, however, was short-lived. After gaining control over Alexandropol, the Turkish army was advancing towards the south and east to eliminate the centre of Armenian resistance based in Yerevan. On 21 May 1918, the Turks started their campaign moving towards Yerevan via Sardarabad. Catholicos Gevorg V ordered that church bells peal for 6 days as Armenians from all walks of life – peasants, poets, blacksmiths, and even the clergymen – rallied to form organised military units. Civilians, including children, aided in the effort as well, as "Carts drawn by oxen, water buffalo, and cows jammed the roads bringing food, provisions, ammunition, and volunteers from the vicinity" of Yerevan.

By the end of May 1918, Armenians were able to defeat the Turkish army in the battles of Sardarabad, Abaran and Karakilisa. Thus, on 28 May 1918, the Dashnak leader Aram Manukian declared the independence of Armenia. Subsequently, Yerevan became the capital and the centre of the newly founded First Republic of Armenia, although the members of the Armenian National Council were yet to stay in Tiflis until their arrival in Yerevan to form the government in the summer of the same year. Armenia became a parliamentary republic with four administrative divisions. The capital Yerevan was part of the Araratian Province. At the time, Yerevan received more than 75,000 refugees from Western Armenia, who escaped the massacres perpetrated by the Ottoman Turks during the Armenian genocide.

=== Soviet era ===
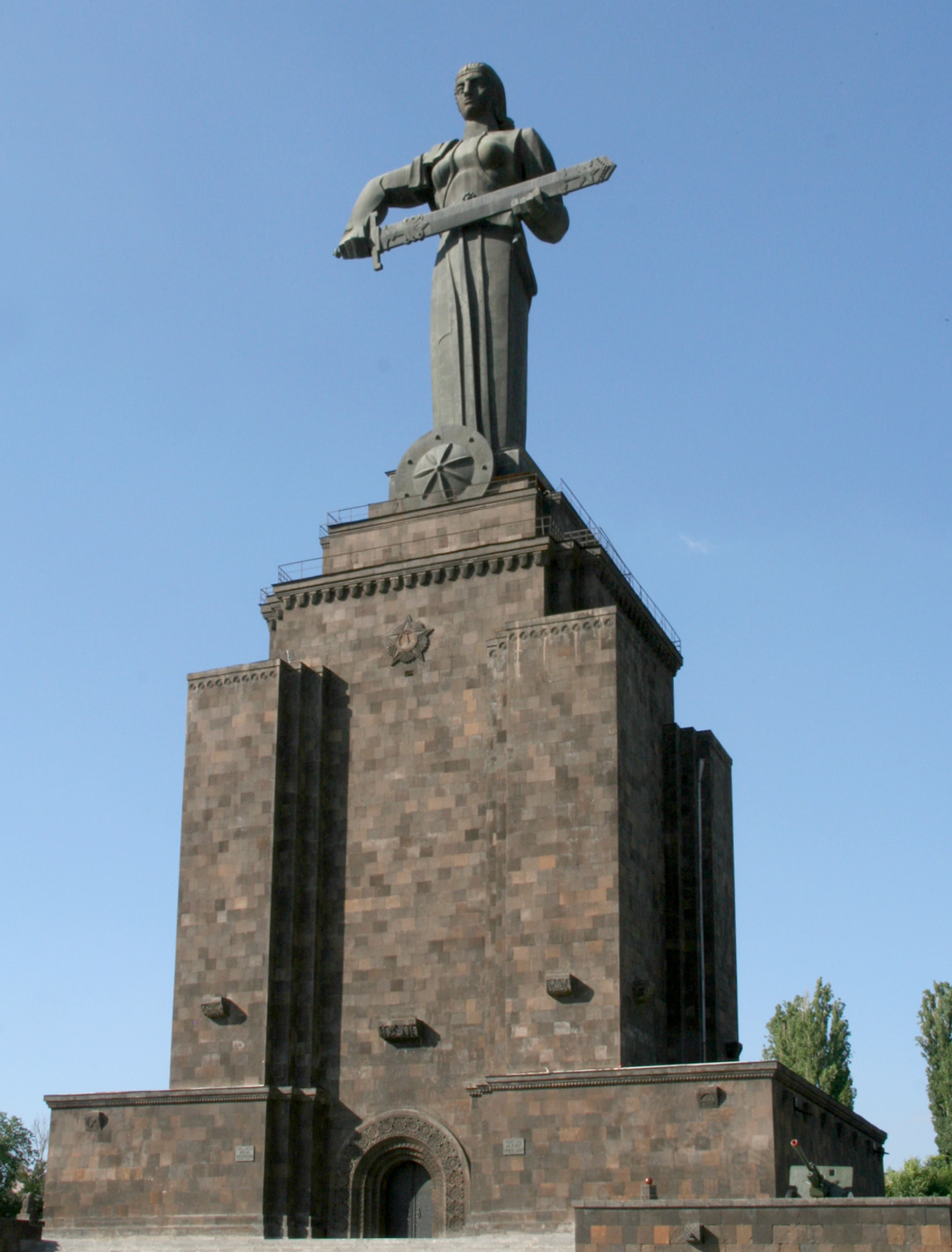
Mother Armenia erected in 1967, replacing the monumental statue of Joseph Stalin

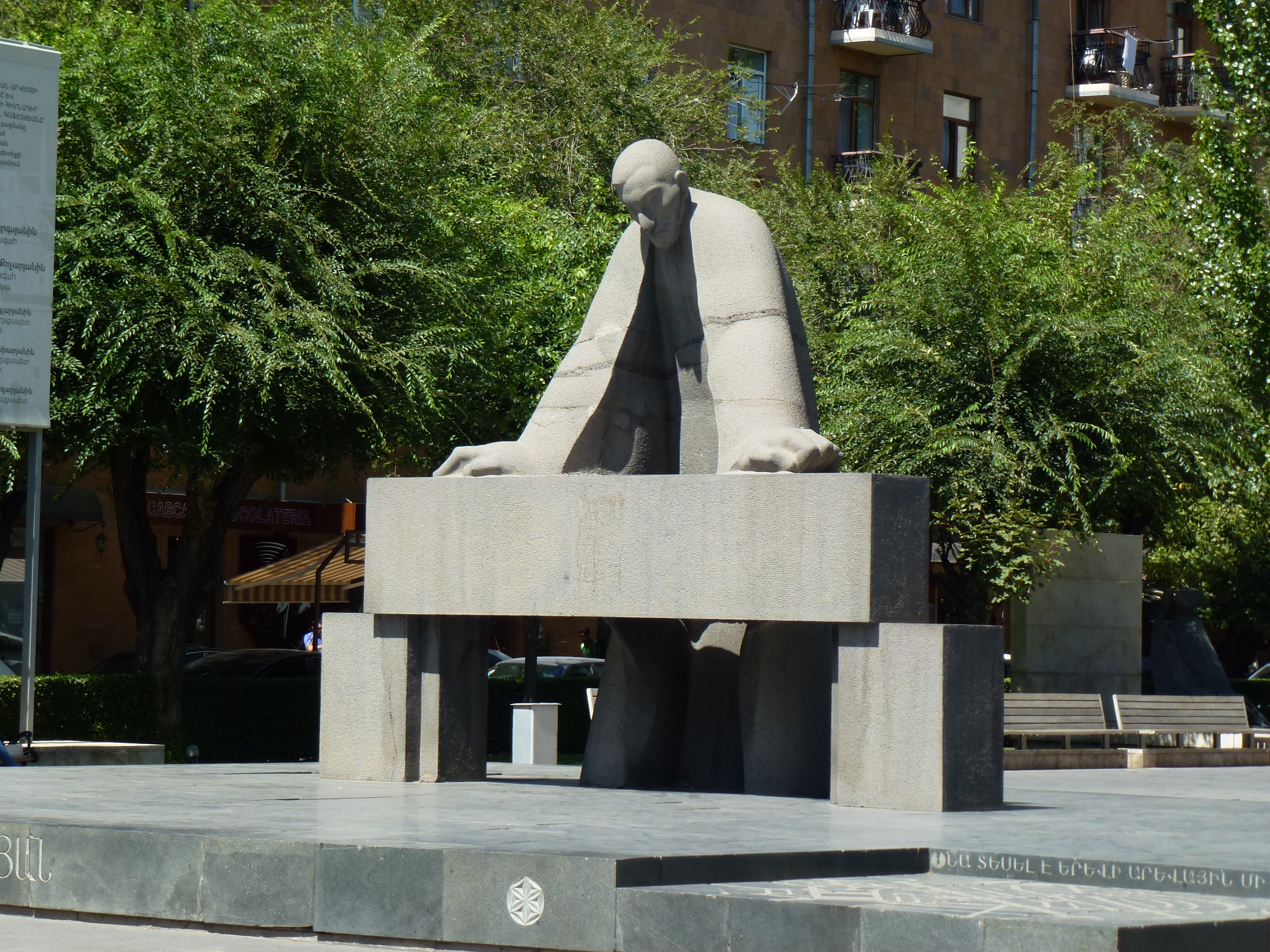
Monument to Alexander Tamanian at the Yerevan Cascade

The 11th Red Army entered Armenia on 29 November 1920, beginning the end of the First Republic. On 2 December 1920, Yerevan became the capital of the Armenian Soviet Socialist Republic, one of the constituent republics of the emerging Soviet Union and initially part of the Transcaucasian SFSR with Soviet Georgia and Soviet Azerbaijan. The Soviet government in Yerevan was briefly overturned by the former leaders of the First Republic in the February Uprising of 1921. However, Soviet authority was restored with the defeat of the rebels in early April.

Within the USSR, Yerevan saw significant development during Vladimir Lenin's New Economic Policy (NEP). The city became the first in the Soviet Union for which a general plan was developed. The "General Plan of Yerevan" was devised by the architect Alexander Tamanian and approved by Soviet authorities in 1924. Tamanian's plan was initially designed for a population of 150,000. However, as the Armenian capital grew rapidly into a modern industrial metropolis, Tamanian began developing plans for a Greater Yerevan of 500,000 residents in 1934. Many of the districts around central Yerevan were named after former Armenian communities that were destroyed by the Ottoman Turks during the Armenian genocide. The areas of Arabkir, Nor Kilikia, and Nor Zeytun, for example, were named after Arabkir, Cilicia, and Zeitun, respectively.

Tamanian incorporated national traditions into contemporary urban construction, bringing together neoclassicism with the organic tuff stone of Armenia. His design presented a radial-circular arrangement that overlaid the existing city and incorporated much of its existing street plan. As a result, many historic buildings were demolished, including churches, mosques, the Erivan Fortress, baths, bazaars and caravanserais. Tamanian's successor, Mark Grigorian, noted that Tamanian originally included a monument to Lenin in his plans. However, according to Aram Piruzyan, this was not realised until after Tamanian's death, when Anastas Mikoyan urged the Soviet Armenian leadership to "actively pursue the matter." The monument, designed by Sergey Merkurov, was inaugurated at Lenin Square (today Republic Square) on 24 November 1940.

As a major industrial centre, Yerevan contributed significantly to the Soviet war effort during the Great Patriotic War of World War II. After the war, following the death of Joseph Stalin, Mikoyan flew to Yerevan and gave a speech on 11 March 1954, where he called for the rehabilitation of Yeghishe Charents, marking the start of the Khrushchev Thaw in Armenia. Behind the scenes, the statesman advised Armenian officials on several major projects in the city, such as the Hrazdan Stadium. As part of de-Stalinisation, the massive statue of Stalin that towered over Yerevan was removed from its pedestal by troops in 1962 and replaced in 1967 with that of Mother Armenia.

On 24 April 1965, thousands of Yerevantsis demonstrated on the 50th anniversary of the Armenian genocide. Two years later, in 1967, the memorial honouring the genocide victims was erected at Tsitsernakaberd hill above the Hrazdan gorge. Under the leadership of Armenian First Secretary Karen Demirchyan, Yerevan witnessed the realisation of additional large-scale projects in the era of Soviet architectural modernism. These included the Yerevan Metro, the Karen Demirchyan Complex, and Zvartnots International Airport. In 1968, the Armenian capital commemorated its 2,750th anniversary.

Yerevan played a major role in the rise of the Karabakh movement. Mikhail Gorbachev's reforms of glasnost and perestroika created the conditions for open discussion on the rights of the Nagorno-Karabakh Armenians, as well as other issues such as the legacies of Stalinism, ecological concerns, and eventually independence. By the beginning of 1988, nearly one million Armenians from several regions of the republic engaged in demonstrations in support of the Karabakh movement, centred on Yerevan's Theater Square (today Freedom Square).

=== Modern independence ===
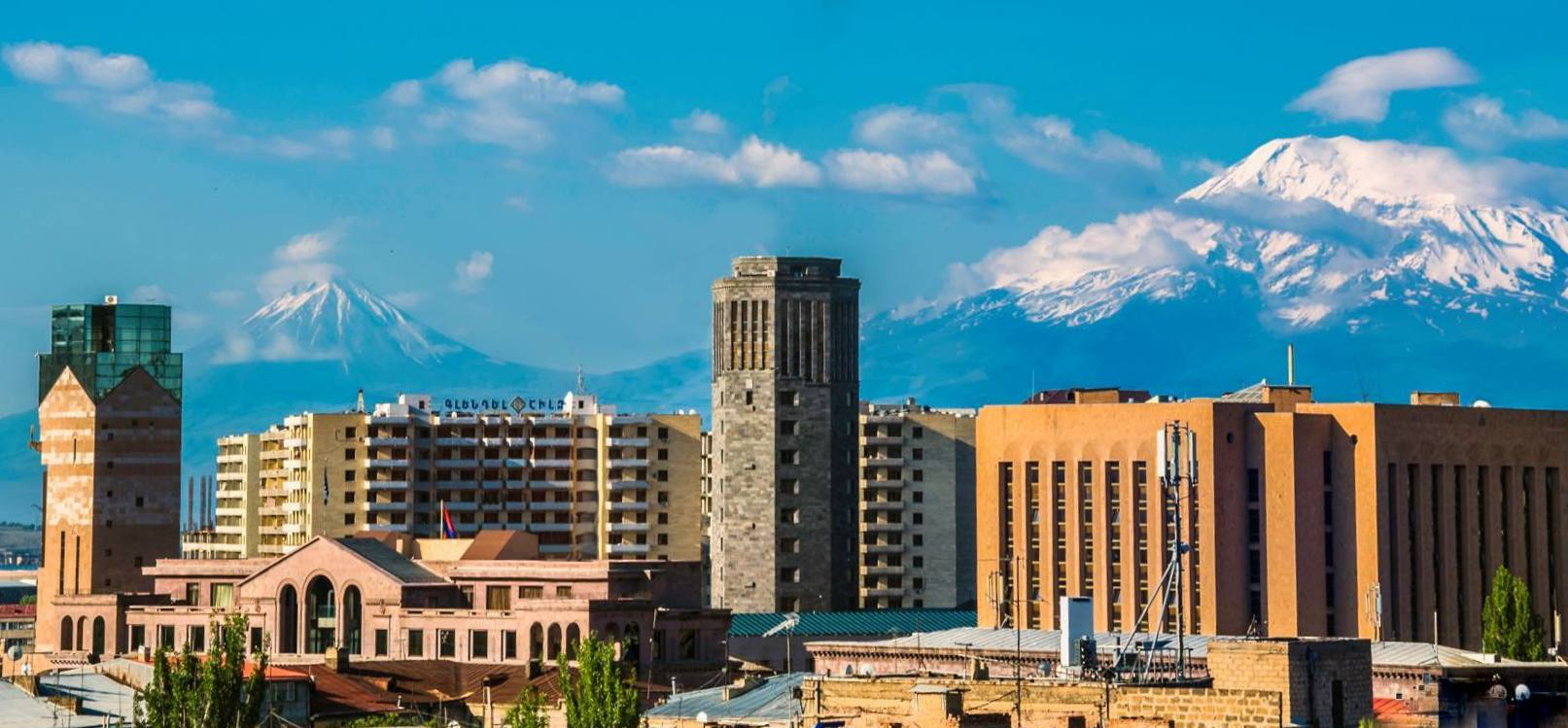
Panoramic view from the Kentron district

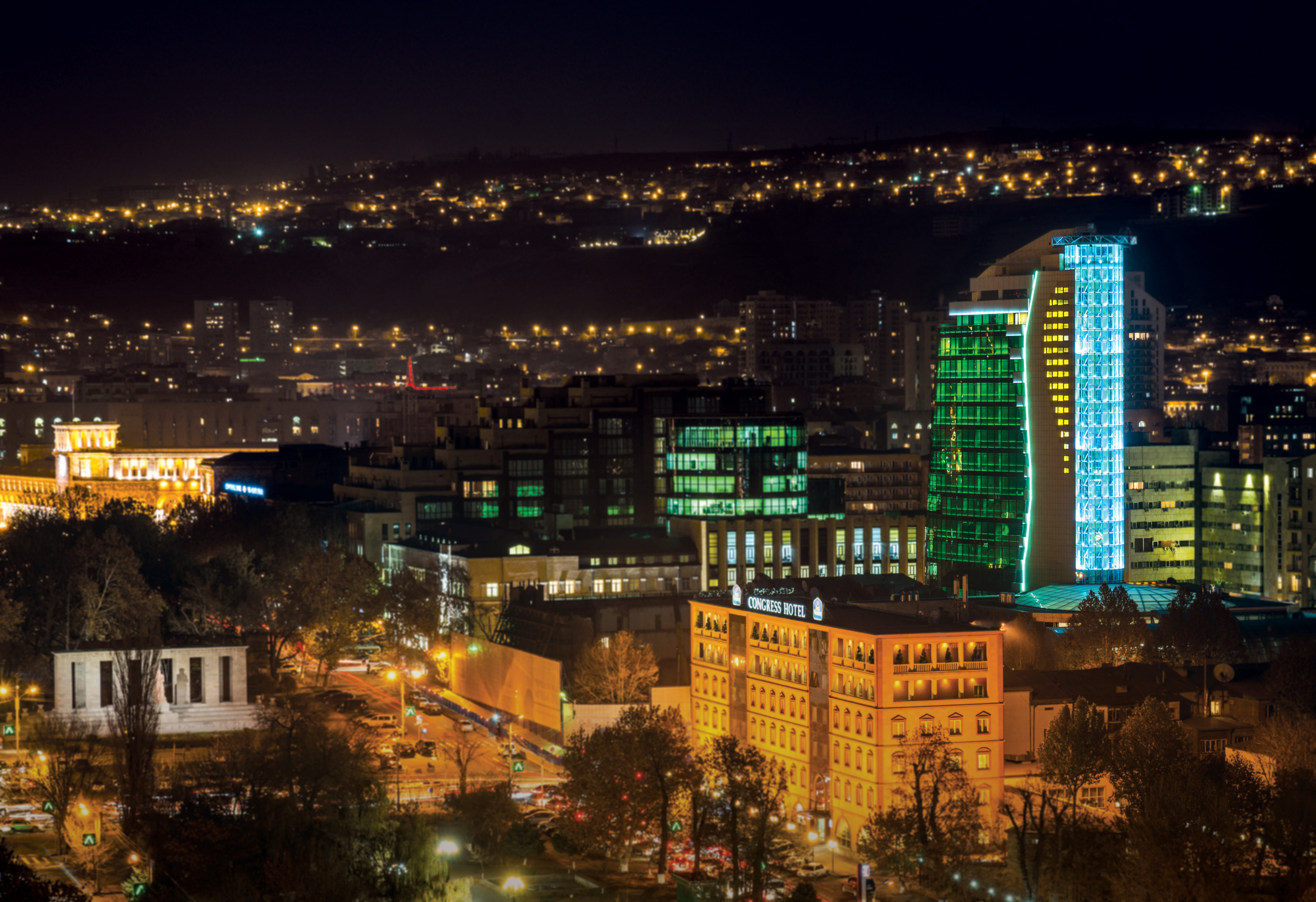
The redeveloped Yerevan downtown is the commercial and business centre of the city

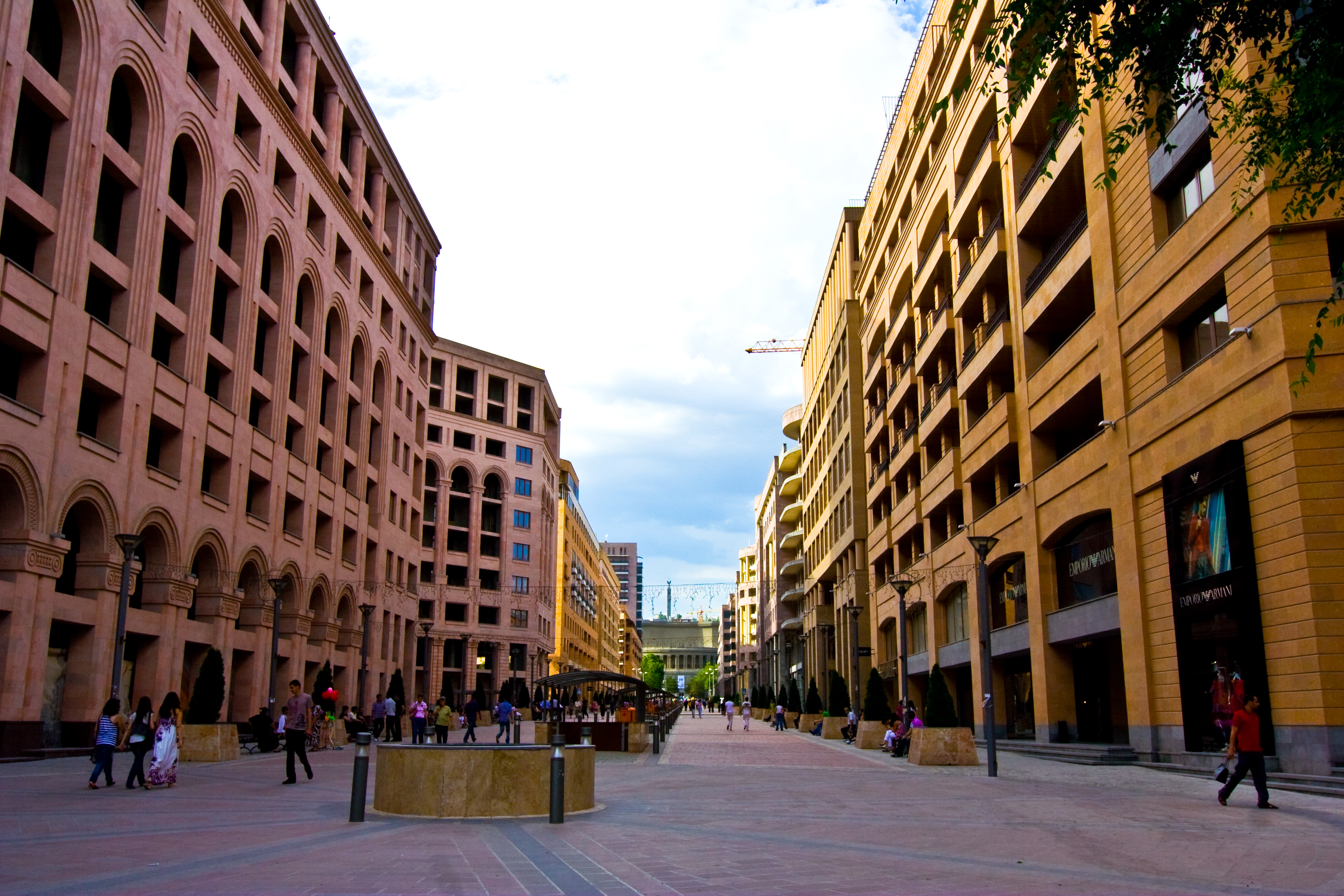
Modern buildings on Northern Avenue

Following the dissolution of the Soviet Union, Yerevan became the capital of the independent Republic of Armenia on 21 September 1991. The monument to Lenin was removed from Republic Square even before independence, on 13 April 1991, although mayor Hambardzum Galstyan argued in favour of a more nuanced and tolerant position. In the early years of independence, maintaining supplies of gas and electricity proved difficult amid the 1990s energy crisis. Constant electricity was not restored until 1996 amidst the chaos of the badly instigated and planned transition to a market-based economy.

Since 2000, central Yerevan has been transformed into a vast construction site, with cranes erected all over the Kentron district. Officially, the scores of multi-storied buildings are part of large-scale urban planning projects. Roughly $1.8 billion was spent on such construction in 2006, according to the national statistical service. Prices for downtown apartments have increased by about ten times during the first decade of the 21st century. Many new streets and avenues were opened, such as the Argishti street, Italy street, Saralanj Avenue, Monte Melkonian Avenue, and Northern Avenue.

However, as a result of this construction boom, the majority of the historic buildings located on the central Aram Street, were either entirely destroyed or transformed into modern residential buildings through the construction of additional floors. Only a few structures were preserved, mainly in the portion that extends between Abovyan Street and Mashtots Avenue.

The first major post-independence protest in Yerevan took place in September 1996, after the announcement of incumbent Levon Ter-Petrosyan's victory in the presidential election. Major opposition parties of the time, consolidated around the former Karabakh Committee member and former Prime Minister Vazgen Manukyan, organised mass demonstrations between 23 and 25 September, claiming electoral fraud by Ter-Petrosyan. An estimated 200,000 people gathered in the Freedom Square to protest the election results. After a series of riot and violent protests around the Parliament building on 25 September, the government sent tanks and troops to Yerevan to enforce the ban on rallies and demonstrations on the following day. Prime Minister Vazgen Sargsyan and Minister of National Security Serzh Sargsyan announced on the Public Television of Armenia that their respective agencies have prevented an attempted coup d'état.

In February 2008, unrest in the capital between the authorities and opposition demonstrators led by ex-President Levon Ter-Petrosyan took place after the 2008 Armenian presidential election. The events resulted in 10 deaths and a subsequent 20-day state of emergency declared by President Robert Kocharyan.

In July 2016, a group of armed men calling themselves the Daredevils of Sassoun (Armenian: Սասնա Ծռեր Sasna Tsrrer) stormed a police station in Erebuni District of Yerevan, taking several hostages, demanding the release of opposition leader Jirair Sefilian and the resignation of President Serzh Sargsyan. 3 policeman were killed as a result of the attack. Many anti-government protestors held rallies in solidarity with the gunmen. However, after 2 weeks of negotiations, the crisis ended and the gunmen surrendered.

== Geography ==
=== Topography and cityscape ===
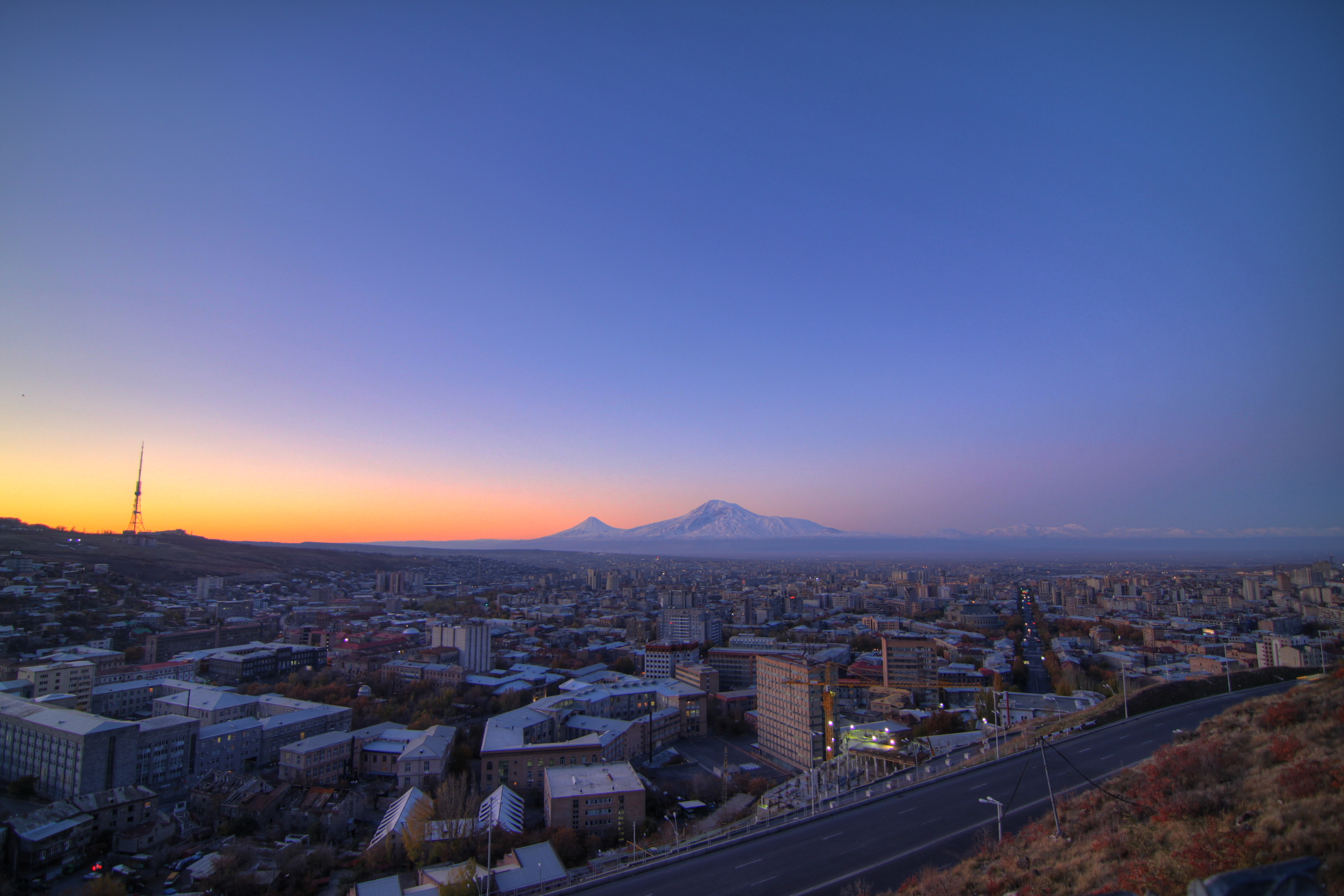
Yerevan is situated in the northeastern part of the Ararat Plain.

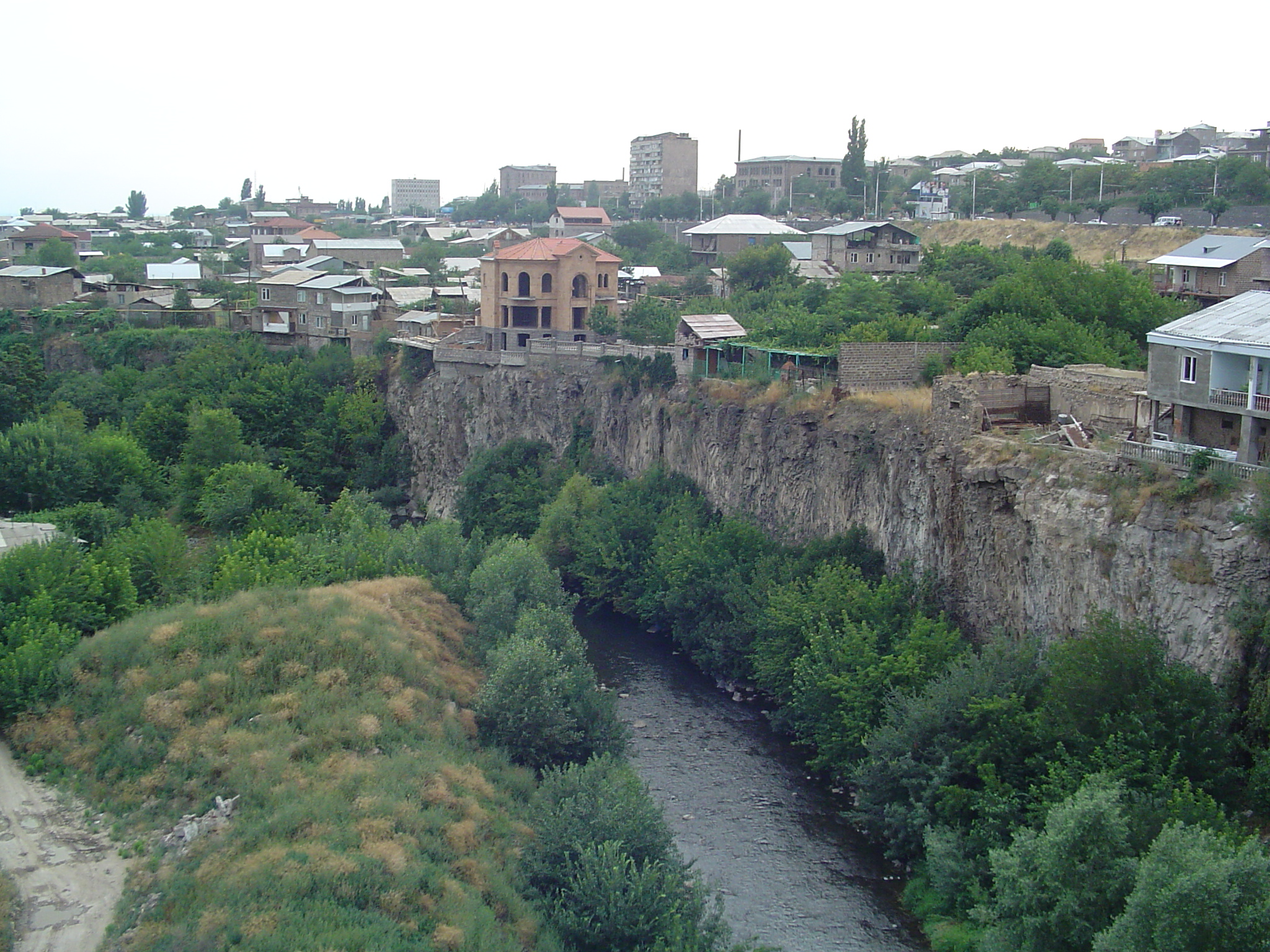
Hrazdan River flowing through Yerevan

Yerevan has an average height of 990 m (3,248.03 ft), with a minimum of 865 m (2,837.93 ft) and a maximum of 1,390 m (4,560.37 ft) above sea level in its southwestern and northeastern sections, respectively. It is among the fifty highest cities in the world with over 1 million inhabitants.

Yerevan is located on the banks of the Hrazdan River, northeast of the Ararat Plain, in the central-western part of the country. The upper part of the city is surrounded with mountains on three sides while it descends to the banks of the river Hrazdan at the south. The Hrazdan divides Yerevan into two parts through a picturesque canyon.

The city is situated at the heart of the Armenian Highland. Historically, Yerevan was located in the Kotayk canton (Armenian: Կոտայք գավառ Kotayk gavar, not to be confused with the current Kotayk Province) of the Ayrarat province of historic Armenia Major.

According to the current administrative division of Armenia, Yerevan is not part of any marz ("province") and has special administrative status as the country's capital. It is bordered by Kotayk Province to the north and the east, Ararat Province to the south and the south-west, Armavir Province to the west and Aragatsotn Province to the north-west.

The Erebuni State Reserve, formed in 1981, is located around 8 km southeast of the city centre within the Erebuni District of the city. At a height between 1300 and 1450 metres above sea level, the reserve occupies an area of 120 hectares, mainly consisting of semi-deserted mountain-steppes.

=== Climate ===
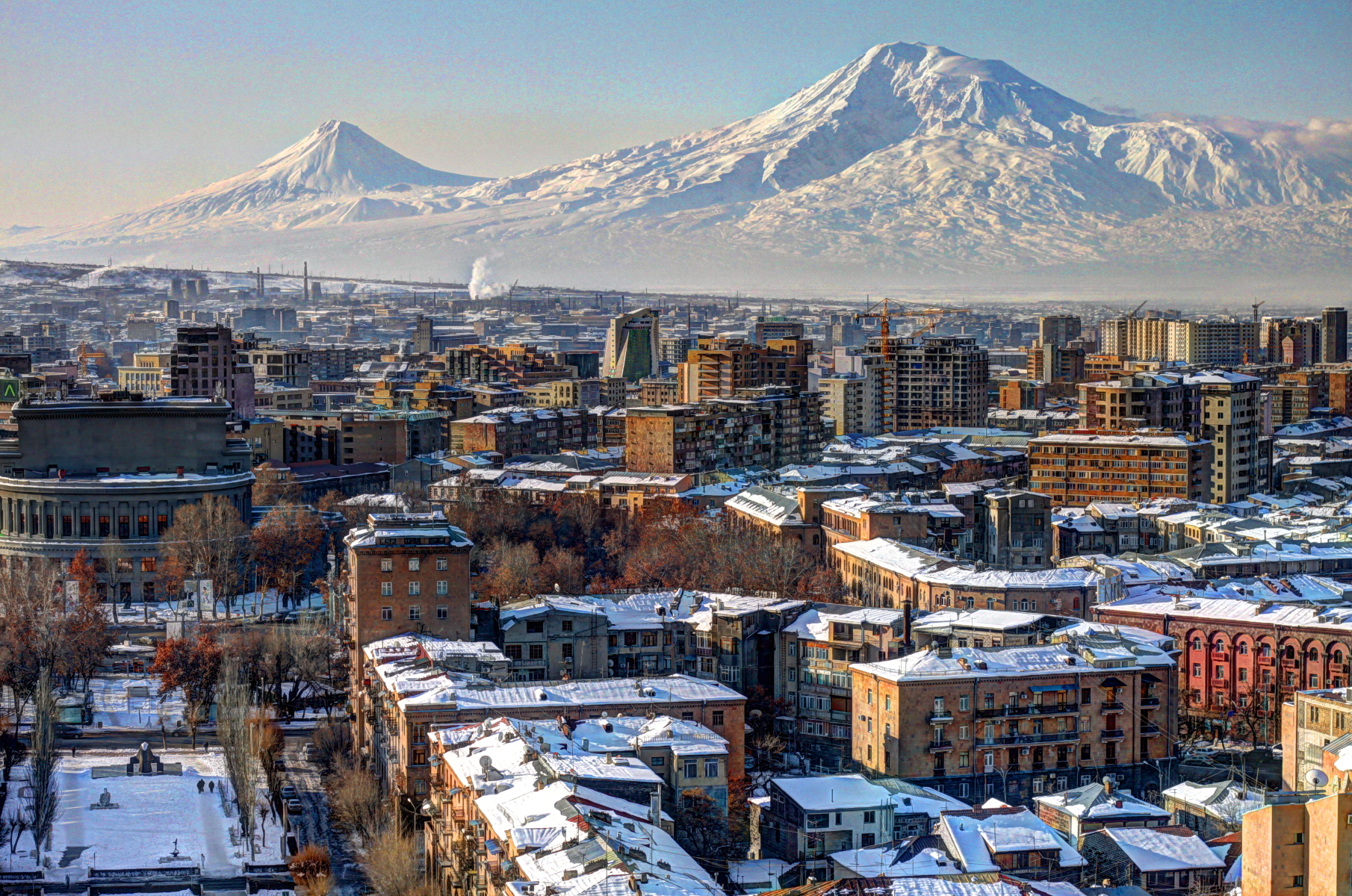
Winter view of Yerevan

Yerevan features a continental influenced steppe climate (Köppen climate classification: BSk or "cold semi-arid climate", Trewartha climate classification BSao), with long, hot, dry summers and short, but cold and snowy winters. This is attributed to Yerevan being on a plain surrounded by mountains and to its distance from the sea and its moderating effects. The summers are usually very hot with the temperature in August reaching up to 40 °C (104 °F), and winters generally carry snowfall and freezing temperatures with January often being as cold as −15 °C (5 °F) and lower. The amount of precipitation is small, amounting annually to about 318 mm (12.5 in). Yerevan experiences an average of 2,700 sunshine hours per year. On 12 July 2018, Yerevan recorded a temperature of 43.7 °C (110.7 °F), which is the joint highest temperature to have ever been recorded in Armenia (along with Meghri city).

Climate data for Yerevan (1991–2020, extremes 1885–present)
Month	Jan	Feb	Mar	Apr	May	Jun	Jul	Aug	Sep	Oct	Nov	Dec	Year
Record high °C (°F)	19.5 (67.1)	19.6 (67.3)	27.6 (81.7)	35.0 (95.0)	36.1 (97.0)	41.1 (106.0)	43.7 (110.7)	42.0 (107.6)	40.0 (104.0)	34.1 (93.4)	26.0 (78.8)	21.0 (69.8)	43.7 (110.7)
Mean daily maximum °C (°F)	1.7 (35.1)	6.3 (43.3)	13.7 (56.7)	19.8 (67.6)	25.1 (77.2)	30.9 (87.6)	34.5 (94.1)	34.4 (93.9)	29.2 (84.6)	21.6 (70.9)	12.8 (55.0)	4.2 (39.6)	19.5 (67.1)
Daily mean °C (°F)	−3.5 (25.7)	0.0 (32.0)	7.0 (44.6)	12.9 (55.2)	17.7 (63.9)	23.1 (73.6)	26.8 (80.2)	26.7 (80.1)	21.4 (70.5)	14.0 (57.2)	5.8 (42.4)	−0.8 (30.6)	12.6 (54.7)
Mean daily minimum °C (°F)	−7.8 (18.0)	−5.4 (22.3)	0.9 (33.6)	6.4 (43.5)	10.8 (51.4)	15.1 (59.2)	19.1 (66.4)	18.9 (66.0)	13.2 (55.8)	7.1 (44.8)	0.1 (32.2)	−4.9 (23.2)	6.1 (43.0)
Record low °C (°F)	−27.6 (−17.7)	−26 (−15)	−19.1 (−2.4)	−10.9 (12.4)	−0.6 (30.9)	3.7 (38.7)	7.5 (45.5)	7.9 (46.2)	0.1 (32.2)	−6.5 (20.3)	−14.7 (5.5)	−28.3 (−18.9)	−28.3 (−18.9)
Average precipitation mm (inches)	21 (0.8)	21 (0.8)	60 (2.4)	56 (2.2)	47 (1.9)	24 (0.9)	17 (0.7)	10 (0.4)	10 (0.4)	51 (2.0)	25 (1.0)	21 (0.8)	363 (14.3)
Average extreme snow depth cm (inches)	5 (2.0)	3 (1.2)	1 (0.4)	0 (0)	0 (0)	0 (0)	0 (0)	0 (0)	0 (0)	0 (0)	0 (0)	1 (0.4)	5 (2.0)
Average precipitation days (≥ 1.0 mm)	4.9	4.3	6.2	8.2	9.3	5.7	3	2.4	2.4	5.1	4.4	5	60.9
Average rainy days	2	4	8	12	12	8	5	4	4	8	7	4	78
Average snowy days	7	7	2	0.2	0	0	0	0	0	0.1	1	5	22
Average relative humidity (%)	75.0	67.6	58.3	55.5	54.6	46.0	42.9	41.1	45.7	57.8	68.6	77.0	57.2
Mean monthly sunshine hours	104.5	136.8	186.5	206.5	267.1	326.6	353.9	333.7	291.5	217.0	159.9	91.0	2,675
Source 1: Pogoda.ru.net
Source 2: NOAA (sun, humidity and precipitation days)

=== Architecture ===
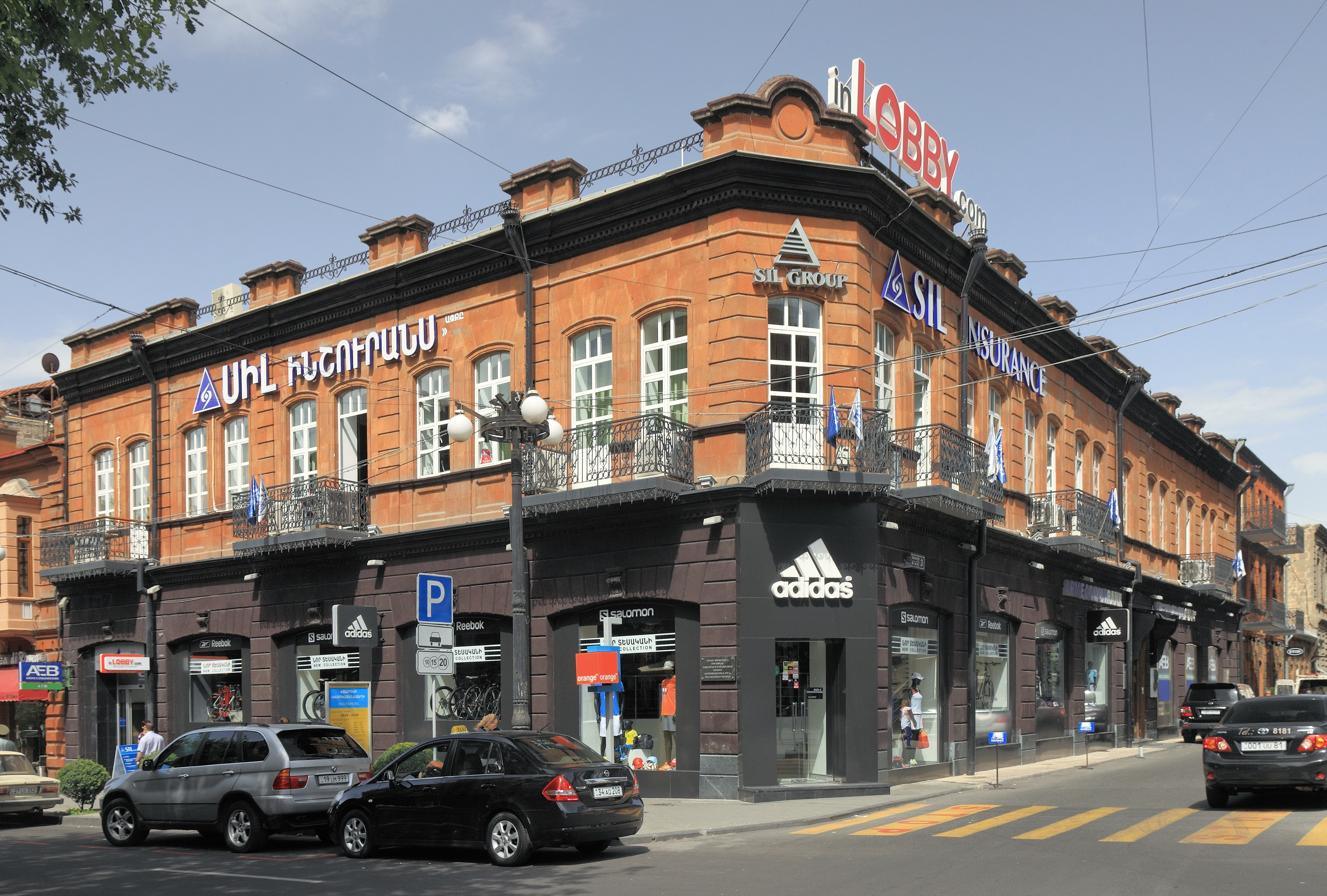
Traditional 19th-century buildings of Yerevan on Aram Street

The Yerevan TV Tower is the tallest structure in the city and one of the tallest structures in the South Caucasus.

The Republic Square, the Yerevan Opera Theatre, and the Yerevan Cascade are among the main landmarks at the centre of Yerevan, mainly developed based on the original design of architect Alexander Tamanian, and the revised plan of architect Jim Torosyan.

A major redevelopment process has been launched in Yerevan since 2000. As a result, many historic structures have been demolished and replaced with new buildings. This urban renewal plan has been met with opposition and criticism from some residents, as the projects destroy historic buildings dating back to the period of the Russian Empire, and often leave residents homeless. Downtown houses deemed too small are increasingly demolished and replaced by high-rise buildings.

The Saint Gregory Cathedral, the new building of Yerevan City Council, the new section of Matenadaran institute, the new terminal of Zvartnots International Airport, the Cafesjian Center for the Arts at the Cascade, Northern Avenue, and the new government complex of ministries are among the major construction projects fulfilled during the first two decades of the 21st century.

Aram Street of old Yerevan and the newly built Northern Avenue are respectively among the notable examples featuring the traditional and modern architectural characteristics of Yerevan.

As of May 2017, Yerevan is home to 4,883 residential apartment buildings, and 65,199 street lamps installed on 39,799 street light posts, covering a total length of 1,514 km. The city has 1,080 streets with a total length of 750 km.

=== Parks ===
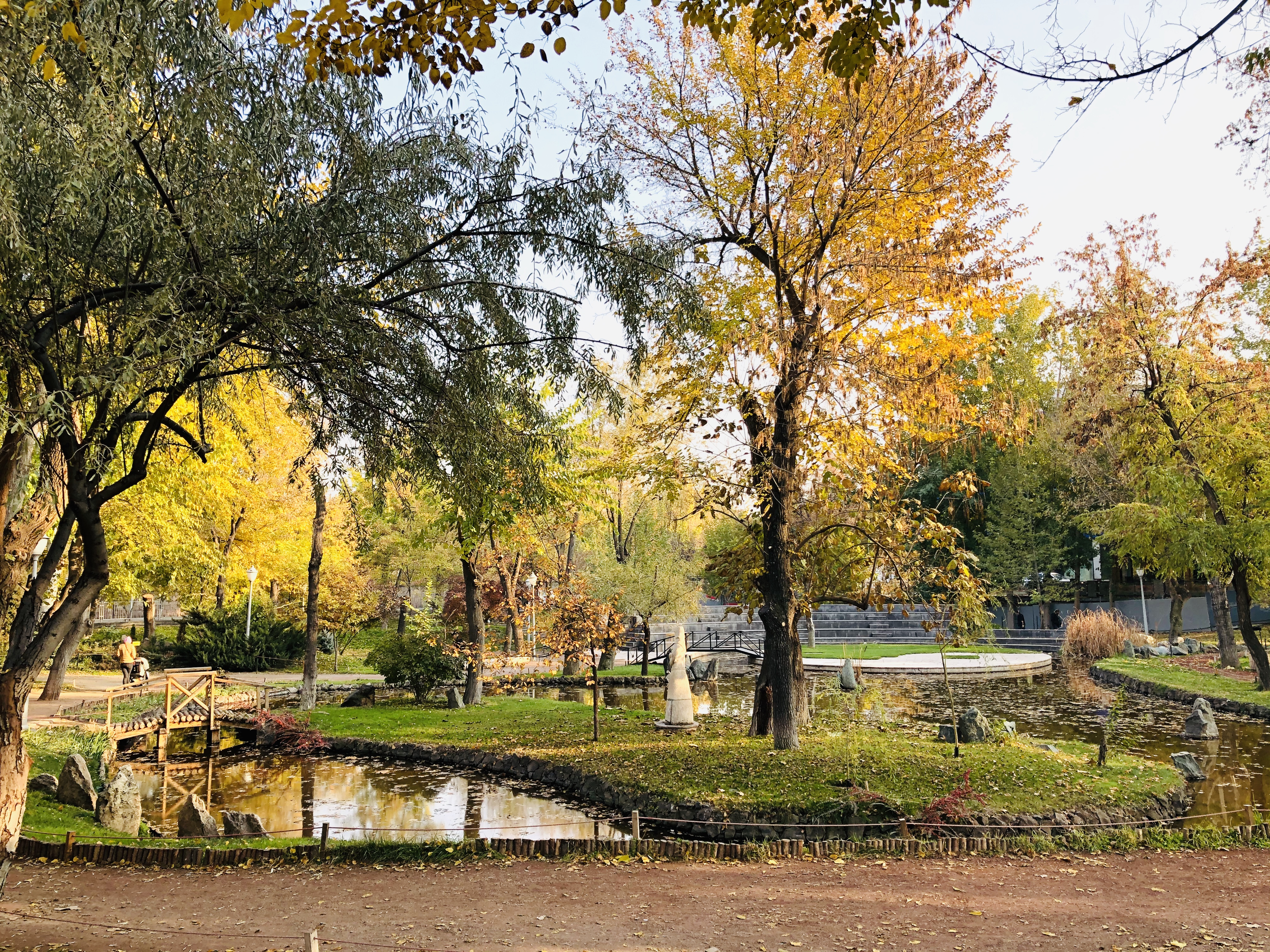
Lovers' Park in Yerevan

Yerevan is a densely built city but still offers several public parks throughout its districts, graced with mid-sized green gardens. The public park of Erebuni District along with its artificial lake is the oldest garden in the city. Occupying an area of 17 hectares, the origins of the park and the artificial lake date back to the period of king Argishti I of Urartu during the 8th century BCE. In 2011, the garden was entirely remodelled and named as Lyon Park, to become a symbol of the partnership between the cities of Lyon and Yerevan.

The Lovers' Park on Marshal Baghramyan Avenue and the English Park at the centre of the city, dating back to the 18th and 19th centuries respectively, are among the most popular parks in Yerevan. The Yerevan Botanical Garden (opened in 1935), the Victory Park (opened in the 1950s) and the Circular Park are among the largest green spaces of the city.

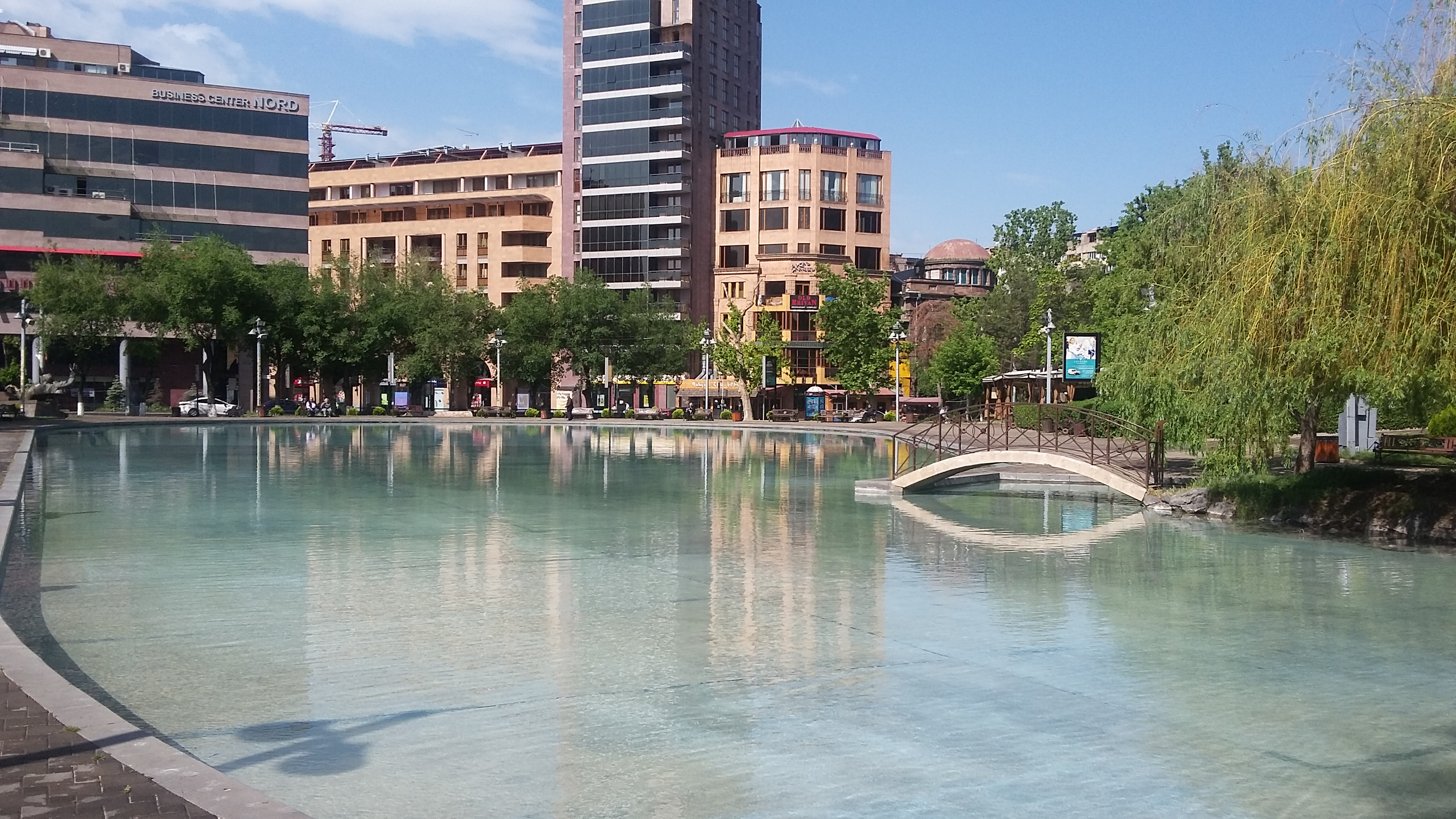
The Swan Lake

Opened in the 1960s, the Yerevan Opera Theatre Park along with its artificial Swan Lake is also among the favourite green spaces of the city. In 2019 some of the public space of the park leased to restaurants was reclaimed allowing for improved landscape design. A public ice-skating arena is operated in the park's lake area during winters.

The Yerevan Lake is an artificial reservoir opened in 1967 on Hrazdan riverbed at the south of the city centre, with a surface of 0.65 km^{2} (0.25 sq mi).

Each administrative district of Yerevan has its own public park, such as the Buenos Aires Park and Tumanyan Park in Ajapnyak, Komitas Park in Shengavit, Vahan Zatikian Park in Malatia-Sebastia, David Anhaght Park in Kanaker-Zeytun, the Family Park in Avan, and Fridtjof Nansen Park in Nor Nork.

== Politics and government ==
=== Capital ===
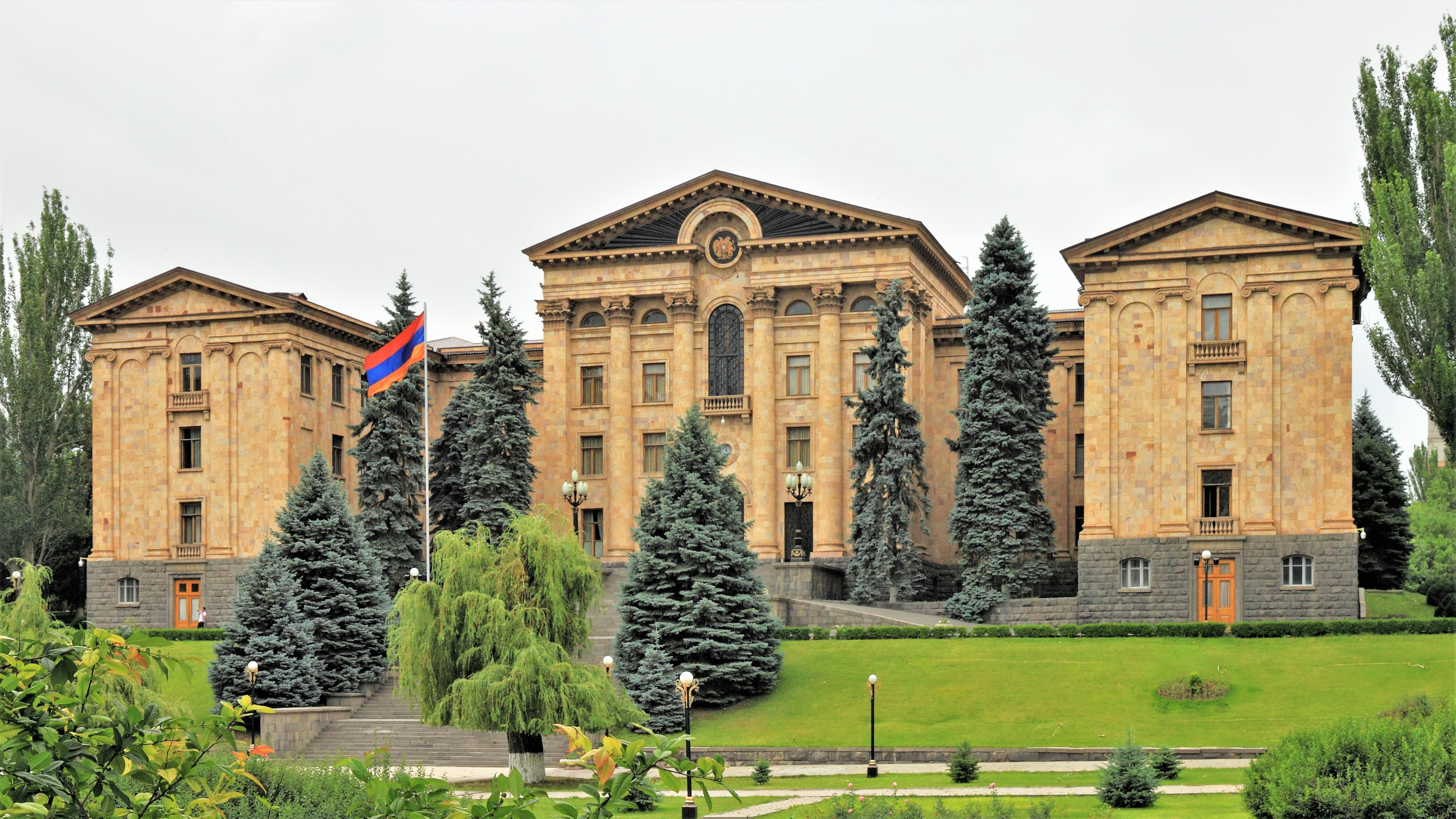
The National Assembly of Armenia on Baghramyan Avenue

Yerevan has been the capital of Armenia since the independence of the First Republic in 1918. Situated in the Ararat Plain, the historic lands of Armenia, it served as the best logical choice for capital of the young republic at the time.

When Armenia became a republic of the Soviet Union, Yerevan remained as capital and accommodated all the political and diplomatic institutions in the republic. In 1991 with the independence of Armenia, Yerevan continued with its status as the political and cultural centre of the country, being home to all the national institutions: the Government House, the National Assembly, the Presidential Palace, the Central Bank, the Constitutional Court, all ministries, judicial bodies and other government organisations.

=== Municipality ===
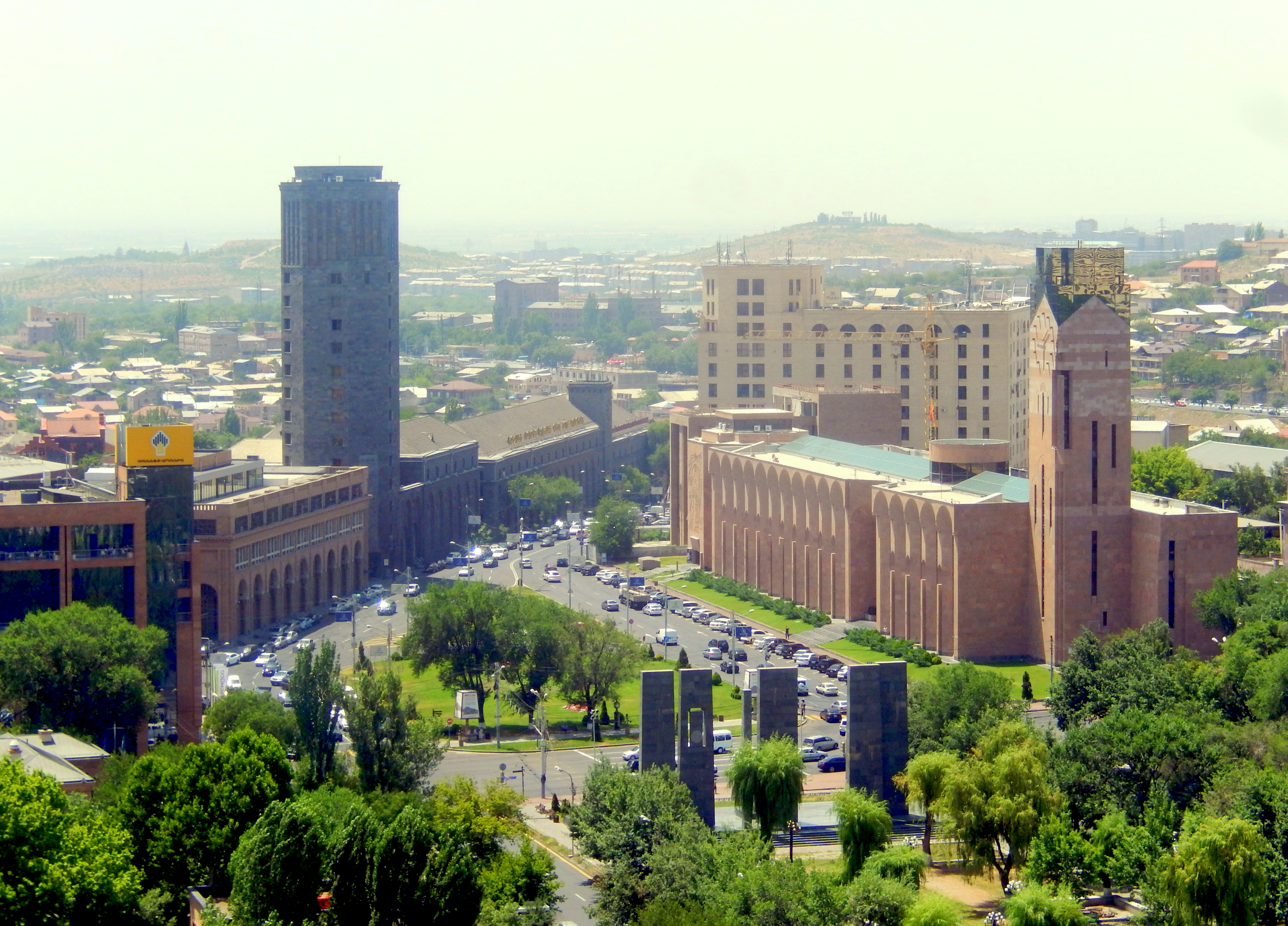
Yerevan City Hall (right)

Yerevan received the status of a city on 1 October 1879, upon a decree issued by Tsar Alexander II of Russia. The first city council formed was headed by Hovhannes Ghorghanyan, who became the first mayor of Yerevan.

The Constitution of the Republic of Armenia adopted on 5 July 1995, granted Yerevan the status of a marz (մարզ, province). Therefore, Yerevan functions similarly to the provinces of Armenia with a few specifications. The administrative authority of Yerevan is thus represented by:

- the mayor, appointed by the President (who can remove him at any moment) upon the recommendation of the Prime Minister, alongside a group of four deputy mayors heading eleven ministries (of which financial, transport, urban development etc.),
- the Yerevan City Council, regrouping the Heads of community districts under the authority of the mayor,
- twelve "community districts", with each having its own leader and their elected councils. Yerevan has a principal city hall and twelve deputy mayors of districts.

In the modified Constitution of 27 November 2005, Yerevan city was turned into a "community" (համայնք, hamaynk); since, the Constitution declares that this community has to be led by a mayor, elected directly or indirectly, and that the city needs to be governed by a specific law. The first election of the Yerevan City Council took place in 2009 and won by the ruling Republican Party of Armenia.

In addition to the national police and road police, Yerevan has its own municipal police. All three bodies cooperate to maintain law in the city.

=== Administrative districts ===
The twelve districts of Yerevan

Yerevan is divided into twelve "administrative districts" (վարչական շրջան, varčakan šrĵan) each with an elected leader. The total area of the 12 districts of Yerevan is 223 square kilometres (86 square miles).

District	Armenian	Population (2011 census)	Population (2016 estimate)	Population (2022 census)	Area (km^{2})
Ajapnyak	Աջափնյակ	108,282	109,100	111,508	25.82
Arabkir	Արաբկիր	117,704	115,800	118,870	13.29
Avan	Ավան	53,231	53,100	55,094	7.26
Davtashen	Դավթաշեն	42,380	42,500	43,704	6.47
Erebuni	Էրեբունի	123,092	126,500	124,957	47.49
Kanaker-Zeytun	Քանաքեր-Զեյթուն	73,886	74,100	73,834	7.73
Kentron	Կենտրոն	125,453	125,700	119,841	13.35
Malatia-Sebastia	Մալաթիա-Սեբաստիա	132,900	135,900	140,784	25.16
Nork-Marash	Նորք-Մարաշ	12,049	11,800	11,098	4.76
Nor Nork	Նոր Նորք	126,065	130,300	134,668	14.11
Nubarashen	Նուբարաշեն	9,561	9,800	11,794	17.24
Shengavit	Շենգավիթ	135,535	139,100	140,525	40.6

== Demographics ==
Historical ethnic composition of Yerevan (excluding the Erivan Fortress)
Year	Armenians		Azerbaijanis^{a}		Russians		Others		Total
c. 1650	absolute majority		—		—		—		—
c. 1725	absolute majority		—		—		—		20,000
1830	4,132	35.7%	7,331	64.3%	—		195	1.7%	11,463
1831	4,484	37.6%	7,331	61.5%	—		105	0.9%	11,920
1873	5,900	50.1%	5,800	48.7%	150	1.3%	24	0.2%	11,938
1886	7,142	48.5%	7,228	49.0%	—		368	2.5%	14,738
1897	12,523	43.2%	12,359	42.6%	2,765	9.5%	1,359	4.7%	29,006
1908	—		—		—		—		30,670
1914	15,531	52.9%	11,496	39.1%	1,628	5.5%	711	2.4%	29,366 (Note: Also appears as 29,766 in the list of populated places in the Caucasus on page 213 of the 1915 publication of the Caucasian Calendar.)
1916	37,223	72.6%	12,557	24.5%	1,059	2.1%	447	0.9%	51,286
1919	—		—		—		—		48,000
1922	40,396	86.6%	5,124	11.0%	—		1,122	2.4%	46,642
1926	59,838	89.2%	5,216	7.8%	1,401	2.1%	666	1%	67,121
1931	80,327	90.4%	5,620	6.3%	—		2,957	3.3%	88,904
1939	174,484	87.1%	6,569	3.3%	15,043	7.5%	4,300	2.1%	200,396
1959	473,742	93.0%	3,413	0.7%	22,572	4.4%	9,613	1.9%	509,340
1970	738,045	95.2%	2,721	0.4%	21,802	2.8%	12,460	1.6%	775,028
1979	974,126	95.8%	2,341	0.2%	26,141	2.6%	14,681	1.4%	1,017,289
1989	1,100,372	96.5%	897	0.0%	22,216	2.0%	17,507	1.5%	1,201,539
2001	1,088,389	98.6%	—		6,684	0.61%	8,415	0.76%	1,103,488
2011	1,048,940	98.9%	—		4,940	0.5%	6,258	0.6%	1,060,138
^a Called Tatars prior to 1918

Historical population
Year	Pop.	±%
1897	29,006	—
1926	62,180	+114.4%
1939	200,396	+222.3%
1959	509,340	+154.2%
1970	775,028	+52.2%
1979	1,025,959	+32.4%
1989	1,201,539	+17.1%
2001	1,103,488	−8.2%
2011	1,060,138	−3.9%
2022	1,086,677	+2.5%

Originally a small town, Yerevan became the capital of Armenia and a large city with over one million inhabitants. Until the fall of the Soviet Union, the majority of the population of Yerevan were Armenians with minorities of Russians, Kurds, Azerbaijanis and Iranians present as well. However, with the breakout of the First Nagorno-Karabakh War from 1988 to 1994, the Azerbaijani minority diminished in the country in what was part of population exchanges between Armenia and Azerbaijan. A big part of the Russian minority also fled the country during the 1990s economic crisis in the country. Today, the population of Yerevan is overwhelmingly Armenian.

After the collapse of the Soviet Union, due to economic crises, thousands fled Armenia, mostly to Russia, North America and Europe. The population of Yerevan fell from 1,250,000 in 1989 to 1,103,488 in 2001 and to 1,091,235 in 2003. However, the population of Yerevan has been increasing since. In 2007, the capital had 1,107,800 inhabitants.

Yerevantsis in general use the Yerevan dialect, an Eastern Armenian dialect most probably formed during the 13th century. It is currently spoken in and around Yerevan, including the towns of Vagharshapat and Ashtarak. Classical Armenian (Grabar) words compose a significant part of the dialect's vocabulary. Throughout the history, it was influenced by several languages, especially Russian and Persian and loan words have significant presence in it today. It is currently the most widespread Armenian dialect.

=== Ethnic groups ===
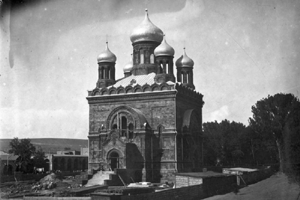
Saint Nikolai Russian Cathedral, destroyed in 1931

Yerevan was inhabited first by Armenians and remained homogeneous until the 15th century. The population of the Erivan Fortress, founded in the 1580s, was mainly composed of Muslim soldiers, estimated two to three thousand. The city itself was mainly populated by Armenians. French traveler Jean-Baptiste Tavernier, who visited Yerevan possibly up to six times between 1631 and 1668, states that the city is exclusively populated by Armenians. Although much of the Armenian population of the city was deported during the 17th century, the city remained Armenian-majority during the Ottoman–Hotaki War (1722–1727). The demographics of the region changed because of a series of wars between the Ottoman Empire, Iran and Russia. In the early 19th century Yerevan had a Muslim majority, mainly with an Armenian and "Caucasian Tatar" population. According to the traveler H. F. B. Lynch, the city was about 50% Armenian and 50% Muslim (Azerbaijanis and Persians) in the early 1890s.

After the Armenian genocide, many refugees from what Armenians call Western Armenia (nowadays Turkey, then Ottoman Empire) escaped to Eastern Armenia. In 1919, about 75,000 Armenian refugees from the Ottoman Empire arrived in Yerevan, mostly from the Vaspurakan region (city of Van and surroundings). A significant part of these refugees died of typhus and other diseases.

From 1921 to 1936, about 42,000 ethnic Armenians from Iraq, Turkey, Iran, Greece, Syria, France, Bulgaria etc. went to Soviet Armenia, with most of them settling in Yerevan. The second wave of repatriation occurred from 1946 to 1948, when about 100,000 ethnic Armenians from Iran, Syria, Lebanon, Greece, Bulgaria, Romania, Cyprus, Palestine, Iraq, Egypt, France, United States etc. moved to Soviet Armenia, again most of whom settled in Yerevan. Thus, the ethnic makeup of Yerevan became more monoethnic during the first 3 decades in the Soviet Union. The Azerbaijani population of Yerevan, who made up 43% of the population of the city prior to the October Revolution, dropped to 0.7% by 1959 and further to 0.1% by 1989, during the Nagorno-Karabakh conflict.

There is an Indian population in Armenia, with over 22,000 residents recorded in the country. Much of this population resides in Yerevan, where a large proportion run businesses, Indian restaurants, and study in Yerevan universities.

=== Religion ===
==== Armenian Apostolic Church ====
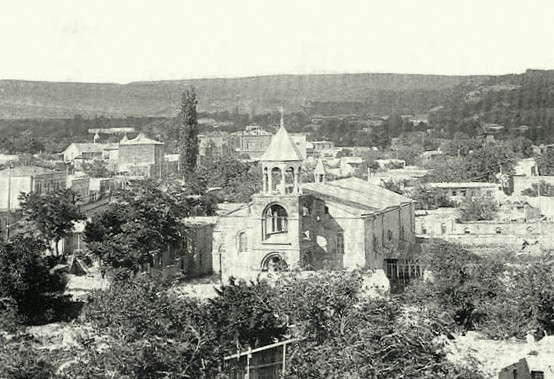
The 5th-century Saint Paul and Peter Church

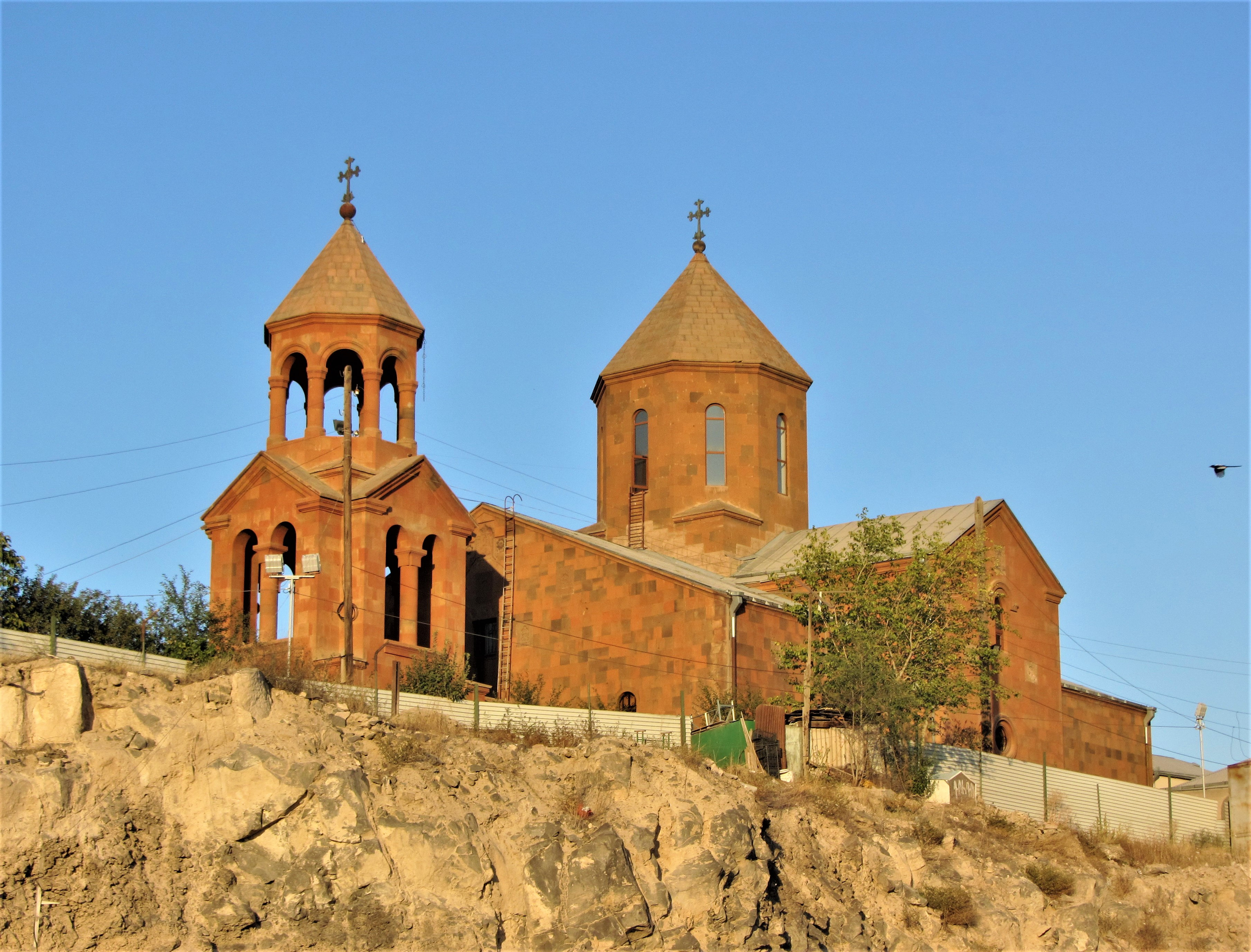
Saint John the Baptist Church, consecrated in 1710

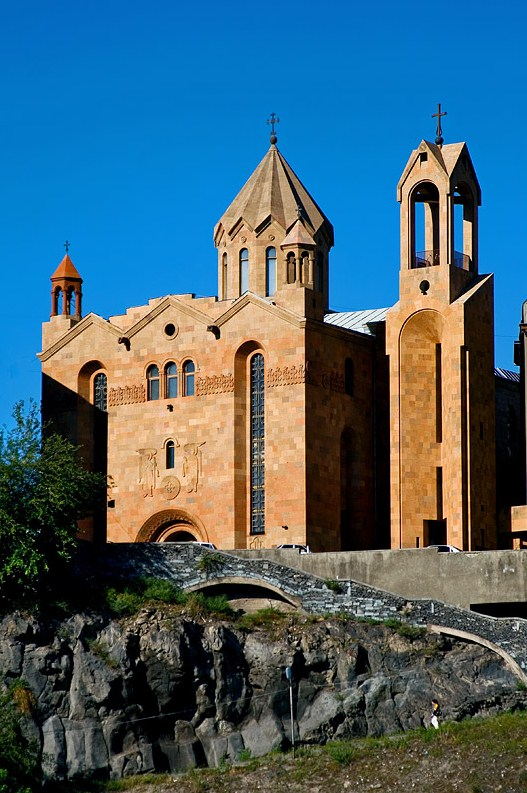
Surp Sarkis Church, consecrated in 1842

Armenian Apostolic Christianity is the predominant religion in Armenia. The 5th-century Saint Paul and Peter Church demolished in November 1930 by the Soviets, was among the earliest churches ever built in Erebuni-Yerevan. Many of the ancient Armenian and medieval churches of the city were destroyed by the Soviets in the 1930s during the Great Purge.

The regulating body of the Armenian Church in Yerevan is the Araratian Pontifical Diocese, with the Surp Sarkis Cathedral being the seat of the diocese. It is the largest diocese of the Armenian Church and one of the oldest dioceses in the world, covering the city of Yerevan and the Ararat Province of Armenia.

Yerevan is currently home to the largest Armenian church in the world, the Cathedral of Saint Gregory the Illuminator. It was consecrated in 2001, during the 1700th anniversary of the establishment of the Armenian Church and the adoption of Christianity as the national religion in Armenia.

As of 2017, Yerevan has 17 active Armenian churches as well as four chapels.

==== Russian Orthodox Church ====
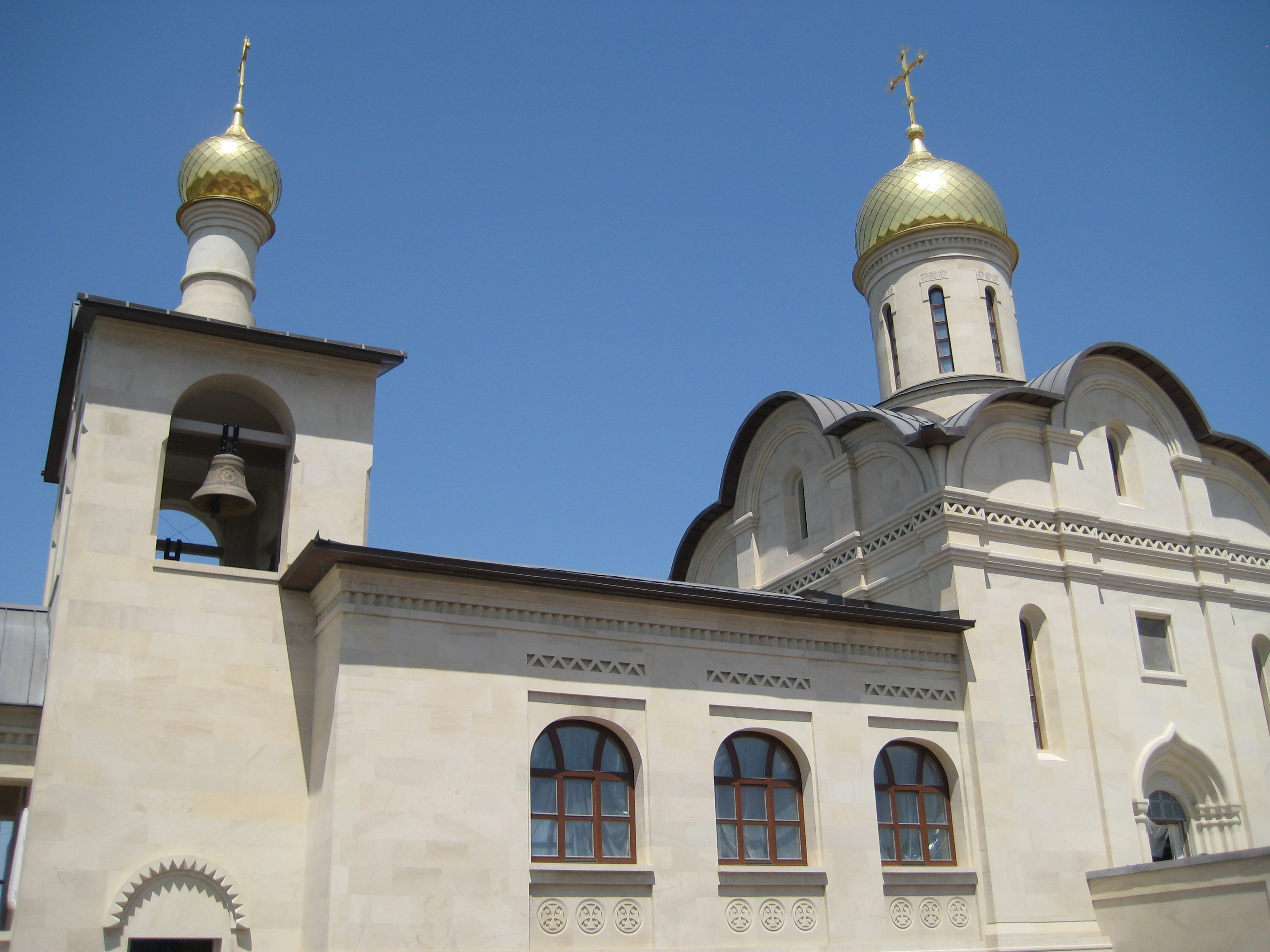
Holy Cross Russian Orthodox Church, consecrated in 2017

After the capture of Yerevan by the Russians as a result of the Russo-Persian War of 1826–28, many Russian Orthodox churches were built in the city under the orders of the Russian commander General Ivan Paskevich. The Saint Nikolai Cathedral opened during the second half of the 19th century, was the largest Russian church in the city. The Church of the Intercession of the Holy Mother of God was opened in 1916 in Kanaker-Zeytun.

However, most of the churches were either closed or demolished by the Soviets during the 1930s. The Saint Nikolai Cathedral was entirely destroyed in 1931, while the Church of the Intercession of the Holy Mother of God was closed and converted first into a warehouse and later into a club for the military personnel. Religious services resumed in the church in 1991, and in 2004 a cupola and a belfry were added to the building. In 2010, the groundbreaking ceremony of the new Holy Cross Russian Orthodox church took place with the presence of Patriarch Kirill I of Moscow. The church was eventually consecrated on 7 October 2017, with the presence of Catholicos Karekin II, Russian bishops and the church benefactor Ara Abramyan.

==== Other religions ====
According to Ivan Chopin, there were eight mosques in Yerevan in the middle of the 19th century. The 18th-century Blue Mosque of Yerevan was restored and reopened in the 1990s, with Iranian funding, and is currently the only active mosque in Armenia, mainly serving Iranian Shia visitors.

Yerevan is home to tiny Yezidi, Molokan, Neopagan, Baháʼí and Jewish communities, with the Jewish community being represented by the Jewish Council of Armenia. A variety of nontrinitarian communities are also found in the city, including Jehovah's Witnesses, Mormons, Seventh-day Adventists and Word of Life.

== Health and medical care ==
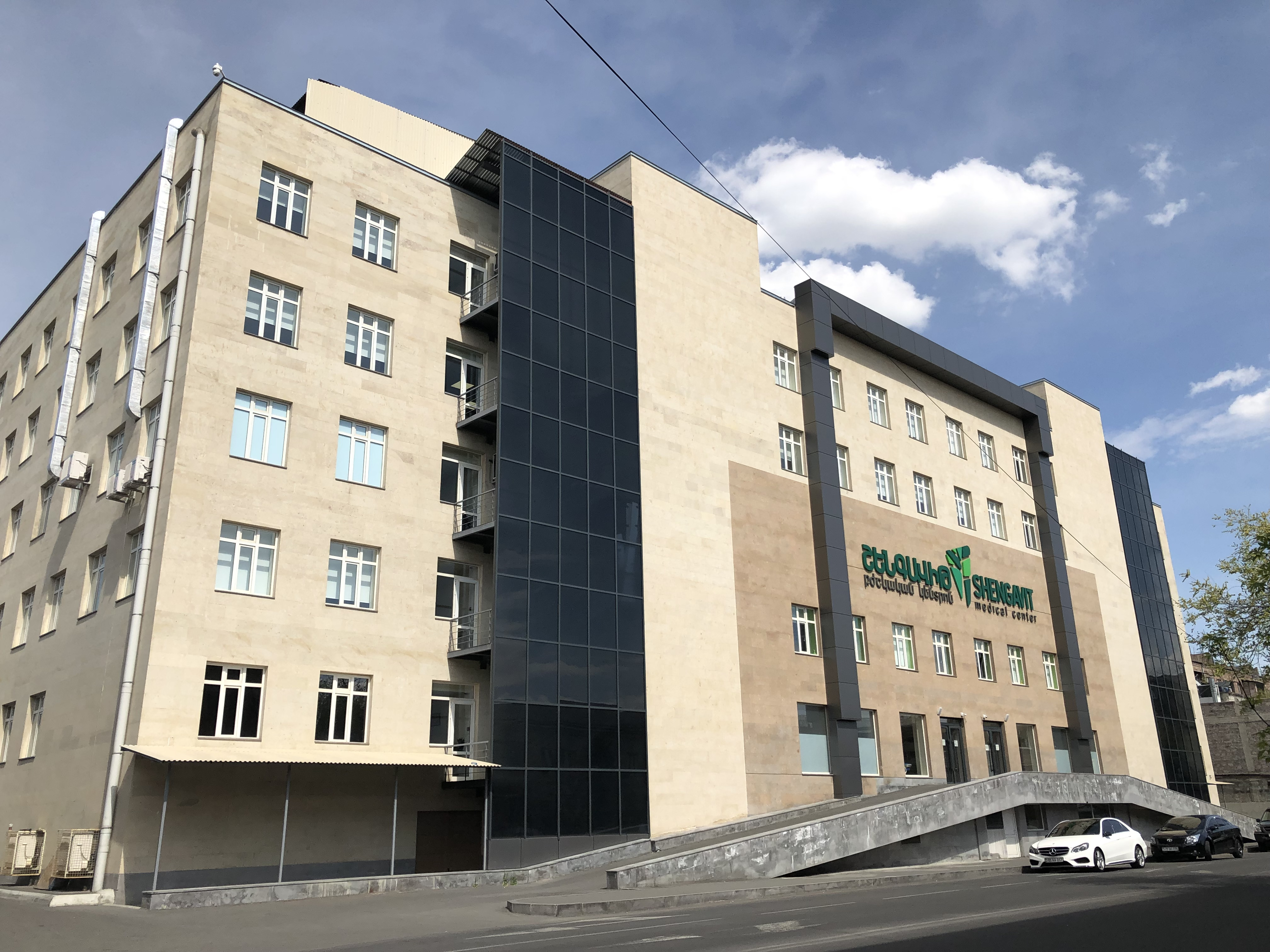
Shengavit Medical Center

Yerevan is a major healthcare and medical service centre in the region. Several hospitals of Yerevan, refurbished with modern technologies, provide healthcare and conduct medical research, such as Shengavit Medical Center, Erebouni Medical Center, Izmirlian Medical Center, Saint Gregory the Illuminator Medical Center, Nork-Marash Medical Center, Armenia Republican Medical Center, Astghik Medical Center, Armenian American Wellness Center, and Mkhitar Heratsi Hospital Complex of the Yerevan State Medical University. The municipality runs 39 polyclinics/medical centres throughout the city.

The Research Center of Maternal and Child Health Protection has operated in Yerevan since 1937, while the Armenicum Clinical Center was opened in 1999, where research is conducted mainly related to infectious diseases, including HIV, immunodeficiency disorders and hepatitis.

The Liqvor Pharmaceuticals Factory, operating in Yerevan since 1991, is currently the largest medicine manufacturer of Armenia.

== Culture ==
Yerevan is Armenia's principal cultural, artistic, and industrial centre, with a large number of museums, important monuments and the national public library. It also hosts Vardavar, the most widely celebrated festival among Armenians, and is one of the historic centres of traditional Armenian carpet weaving.

=== Museums ===
Yerevan is home to a large number of museums, art galleries and libraries. The most prominent of these are the National Gallery of Armenia, the History Museum of Armenia, the Cafesjian Museum of Art, the Matenadaran library of ancient manuscripts, and the Armenian Genocide Museum at the Tsitsernakaberd Armenian Genocide Memorial Complex.

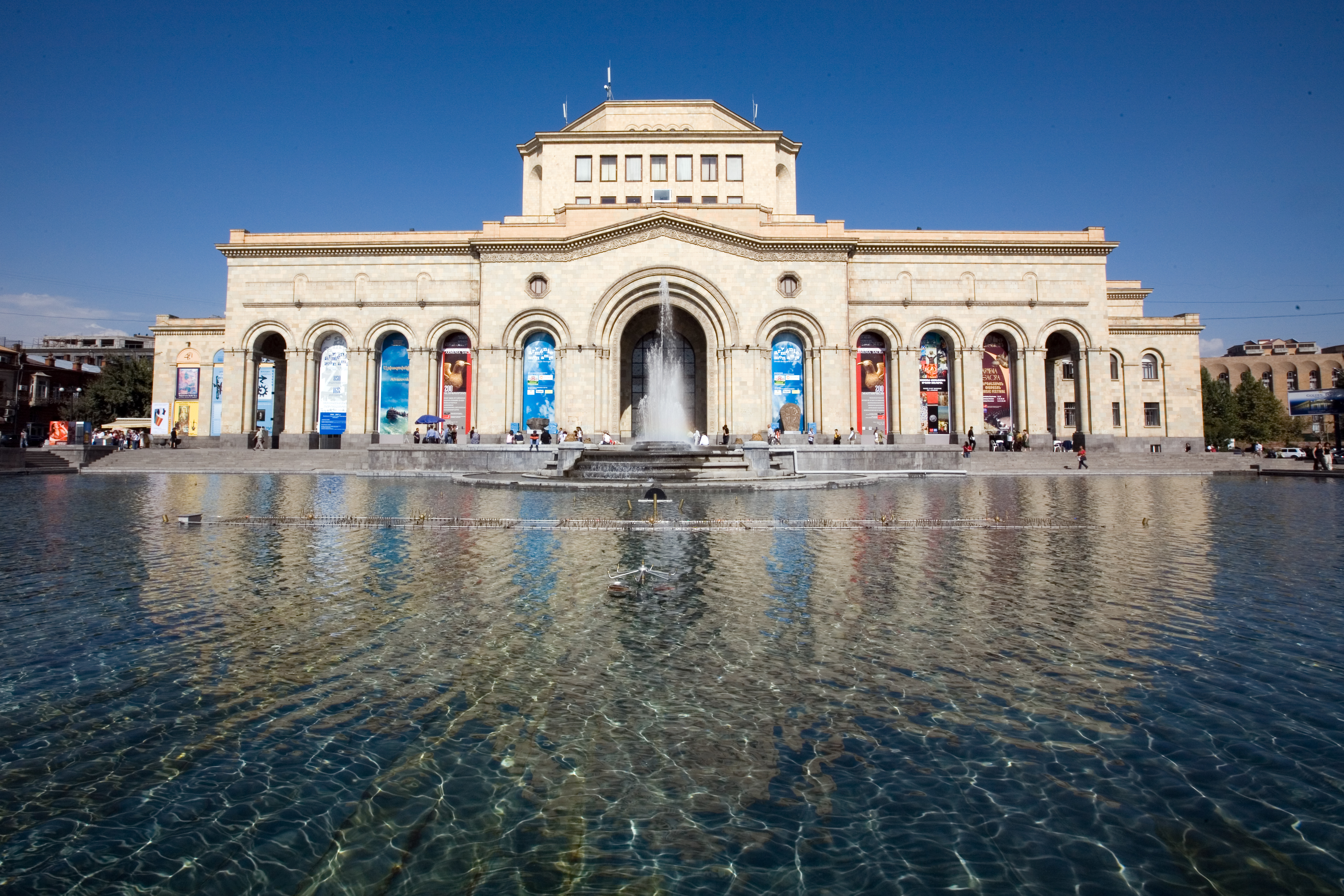
The National Gallery of Armenia

Founded in 1921, the National Gallery of Armenia and the History Museum of Armenia are the principal museums of the city. In addition to having a permanent exposition of works by Armenian painters, the gallery houses a collection of paintings, drawings and sculptures by German, American, Austrian, Belgian, Spanish, French, Hungarian, Italian, Dutch, Russian and Swiss artists. It usually hosts temporary expositions.

The Armenian Genocide Museum is located at the foot of the Tsitsernakaberd Armenian Genocide Memorial Complex and features numerous eyewitness accounts, texts and photographs from the time. It comprises a memorial stone made of three parts, the latter of which is dedicated to the intellectual and political figures who, as the museum's site says, "raised their protest against the Genocide committed against the Armenians by the Turks," such as Armin T. Wegner, Hedvig Büll, Henry Morgenthau Sr., Franz Werfel, Johannes Lepsius, James Bryce, Anatole France, Giacomo Gorrini, Benedict XV, Fridtjof Nansen, and others.

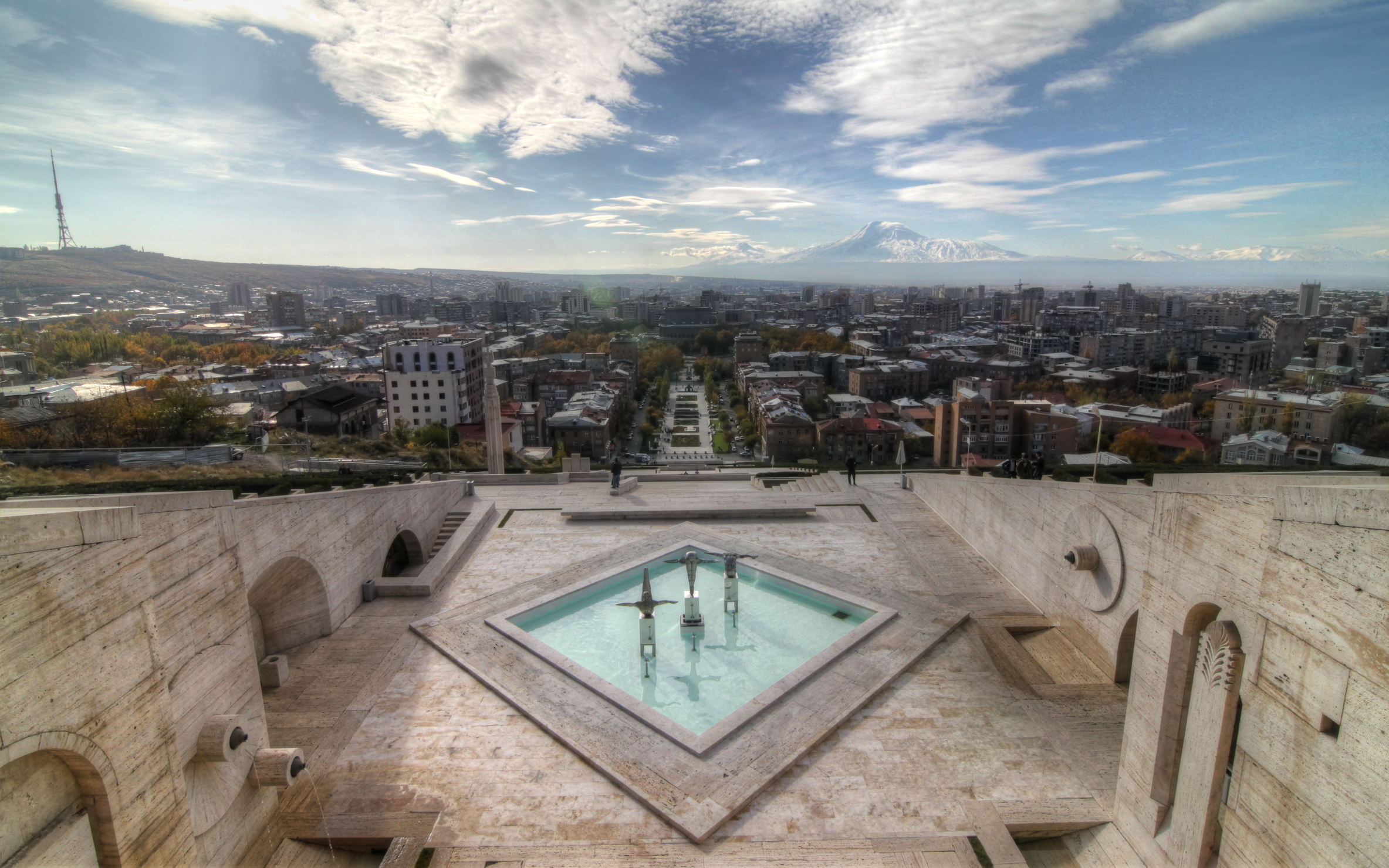
View from a garden terrace of the Cafesjian Museum of Art at the Cascade

Cafesjian Museum of Art within the Yerevan Cascade is an art centre opened on 7 November 2009. It showcases a massive collection of glass artwork, particularly the works of the Czech artists Stanislav Libenský and Jaroslava Brychtová. The front gardens showcase sculptures from Gerard L. Cafesjian's collection.

The Erebuni Museum founded in 1968, is an archaeological museum housing Urartian artefacts found during excavations at the Erebuni Fortress. The Yerevan History Museum and the Armenian Revolutionary Federation History Museum are among the prominent museums that feature the history of Yerevan and the First Republic of Armenia respectively. The Military Museum within the Mother Armenia complex is about the participation of Armenian soldiers in World War II and the Nagorno-Karabakh conflict.

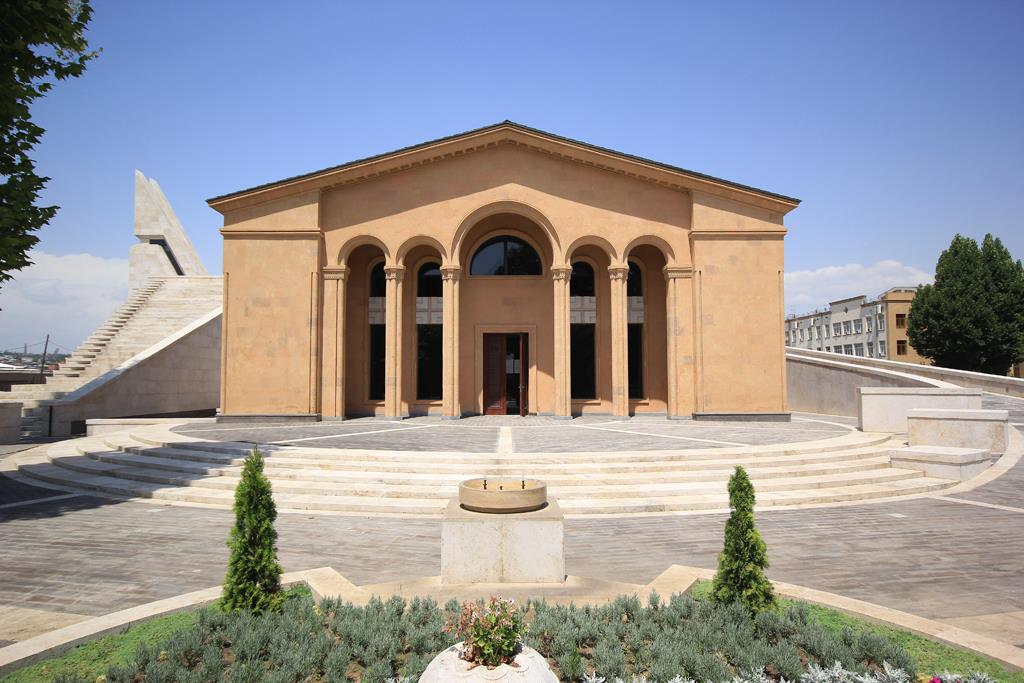
Komitas Museum

The city is also home to a large number of art museums. Sergei Parajanov Museum opened in 1988 is dedicated to Sergei Parajanov's art works in cinema and painting. Komitas Museum opened in 2015, is a musical art museum devoted to the renowned Armenian composer Komitas. Charents Museum of Literature and Arts opened in 1921, Modern Art Museum of Yerevan opened in 1972, and the Middle East Art Museum opened in 1993, are also among the notable art museums of the city.

Biographical museums are also common in Yerevan. Many renowned Armenian poets, painters and musicians are honoured with house-museums in their memory, such as poet Hovhannes Tumanyan, composer Aram Khachaturian, painter Martiros Saryan, novelist Khachatur Abovian, and French-Armenian singer Charles Aznavour.

Many museums of science and technology have opened in Yerevan, such as the Museum of Armenian Medicine (1999), the Space Museum of Yerevan (2001), Museum of Science and Technology (2008), Museum of Communications (2012) and the Little Einstein Interactive Science Museum (2016).

=== Libraries ===
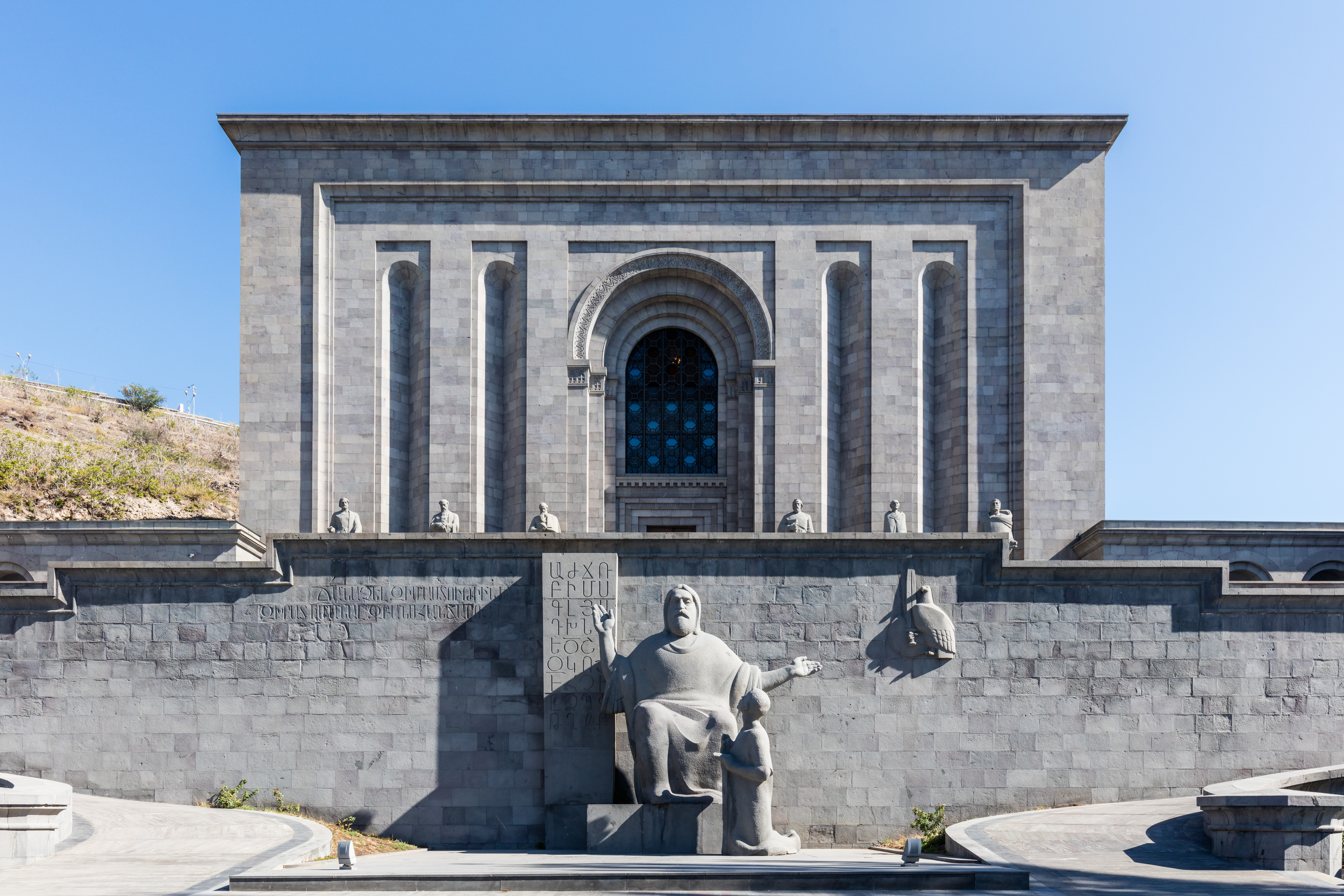
Matenadaran library-museum of ancient manuscripts

The National Library of Armenia located on Teryan Street is the chief public library of the city and the entire republic. It was founded in 1832 and is operating in its current building since 1939. Another national library of Yerevan is the Khnko Aper Children's Library, founded in 1933. Other major public libraries include the Avetik Isahakyan Central Library founded in 1935, the Republican Library of Medical Sciences founded in 1939, the Library of Science and Technology founded in 1957, and the Musical Library founded in 1965. In addition, each administrative district of Yerevan has its own public library (usually more than one library).

The Matenadaran is a library-museum and a research centre, regrouping 17,000 ancient manuscripts and several bibles from the Middle Ages. Its archives hold a rich collection of valuable ancient Armenian, Ancient Greek, Aramaic, Assyrian, Hebrew, Latin, Middle and Modern Persian manuscripts. It is located on Mashtots Avenue at central Yerevan.

On 6 June 2010, Yerevan was named as the 2012 World Book Capital by the United Nations Educational, Scientific and Cultural Organization (UNESCO). The Armenian capital was chosen for the quality and variety of the programme it presented to the selection committee, which met at UNESCO's headquarters in Paris on 2 July 2010.

The National Archives of Armenia founded in 1923, is a scientific research centre and depositary, with a collection of around 3.5 million units of valuable documents.

=== Art ===
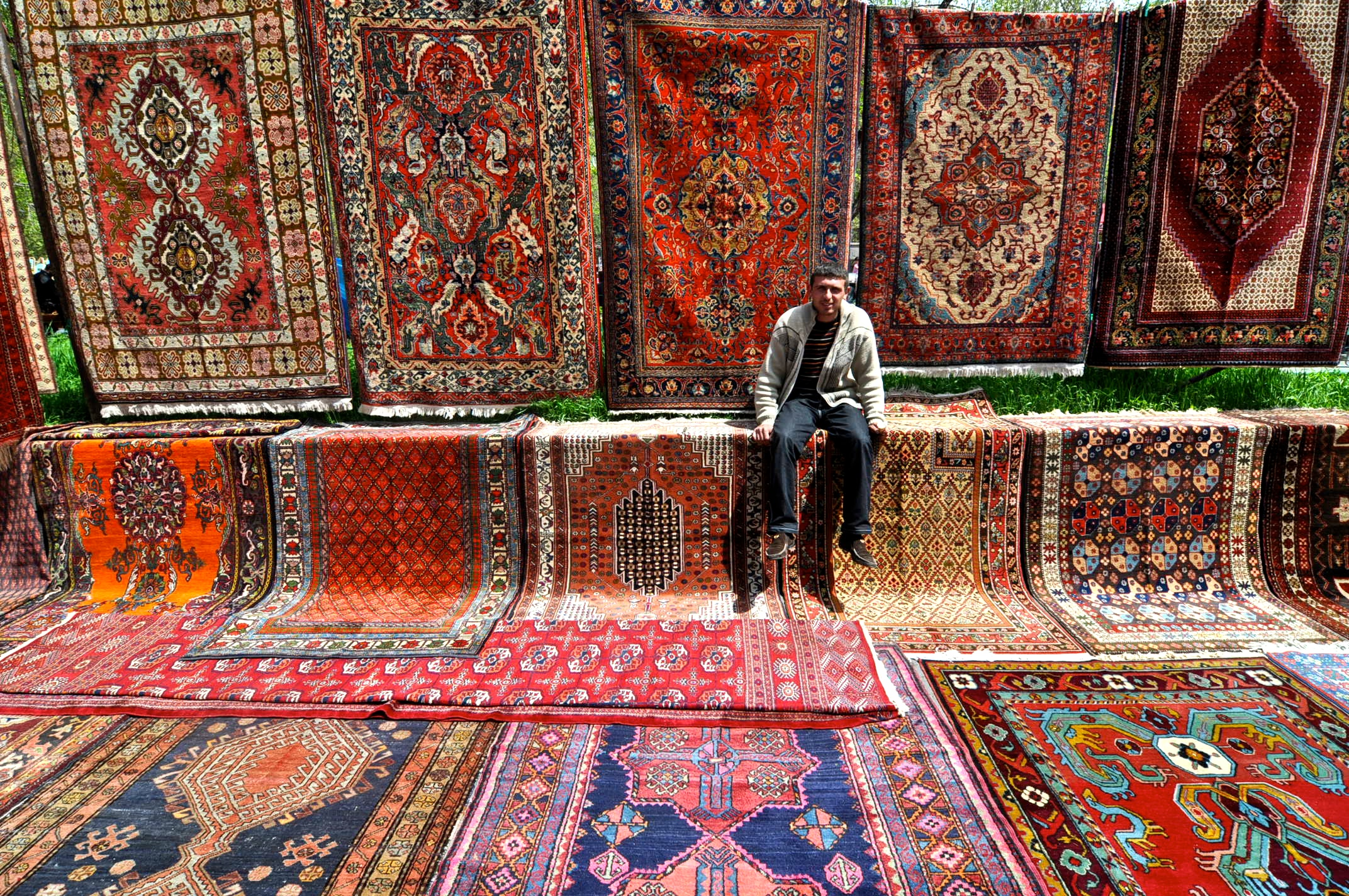
Handmade Armenian rugs at the Yerevan Vernissage

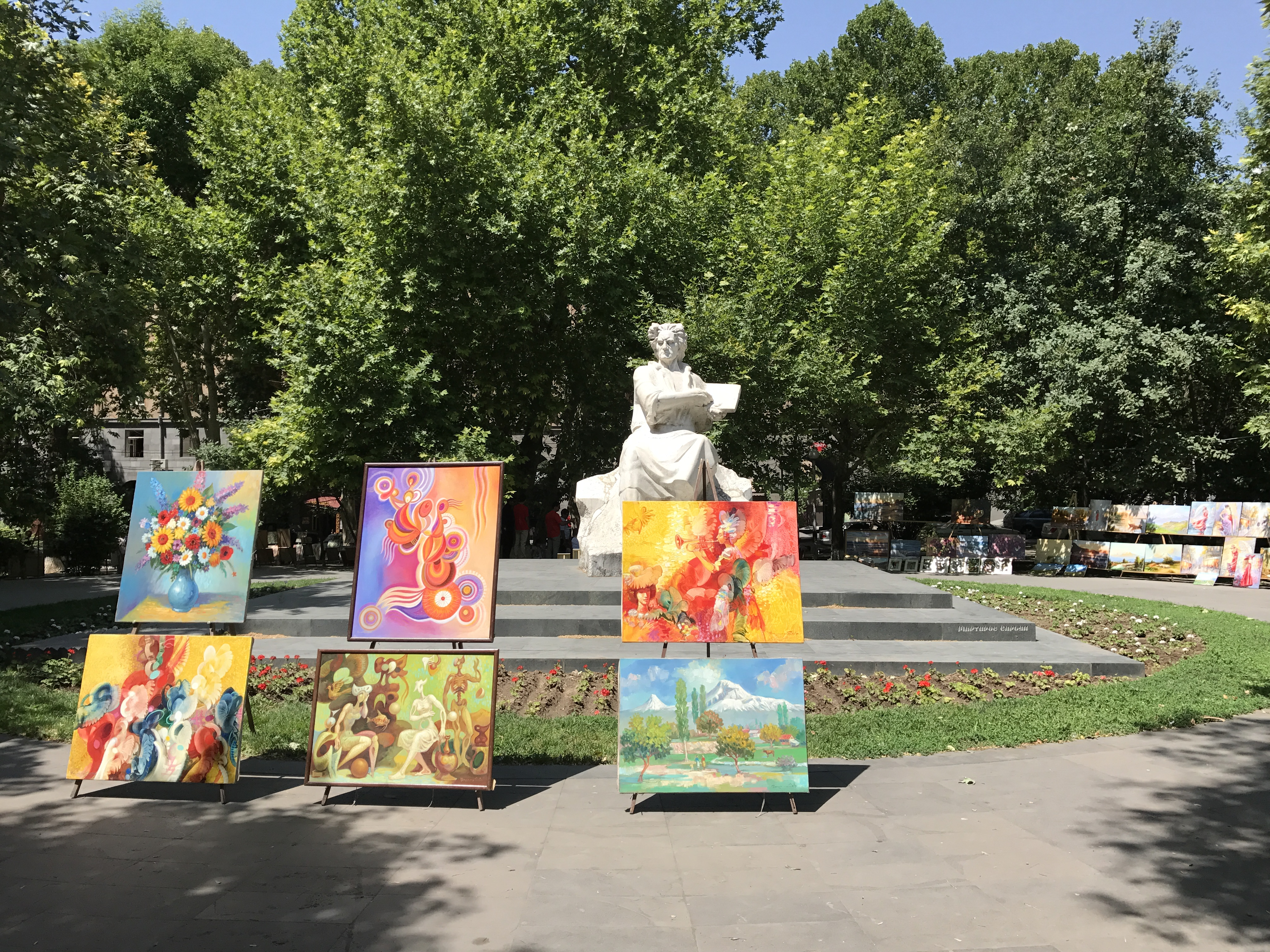
Paintings exhibited at Saryan Park

Yerevan is one of the historic centres of traditional Armenian carpet. Various rug fragments have been excavated in areas around Yerevan dating back to the 7th century BC or earlier. The tradition was further developed from the 16th century when Yerevan became the central city of Persian Armenia. However, carpet manufacturing in the city was greatly enriched with the flock of Western Armenian migrants from the Ottoman Empire throughout the 19th century, and the arrival of Armenian refugees escaping the genocide in the early 20th century. Currently, the city is home to the Arm Carpet factory opened in 1924, as well as the Tufenkian handmade carpets (since 1994), and Megerian handmade carpets (since 2000).

The Yerevan Vernissage open-air exhibition-market formed in the late 1980s on Aram Street, features a large collection of different types of traditional Armenian hand-made art works, especially woodwork sculptures, rugs and carpets. On the other hand, the Saryan park located near the opera house, is famous for being a permanent venue where artists exhibit their paintings.

The Armenian Center for Contemporary Experimental Art founded in 1992 in Yerevan, is a creativity centre helping to exchange experience between professional artists in an appropriate atmosphere.

==== Music ====
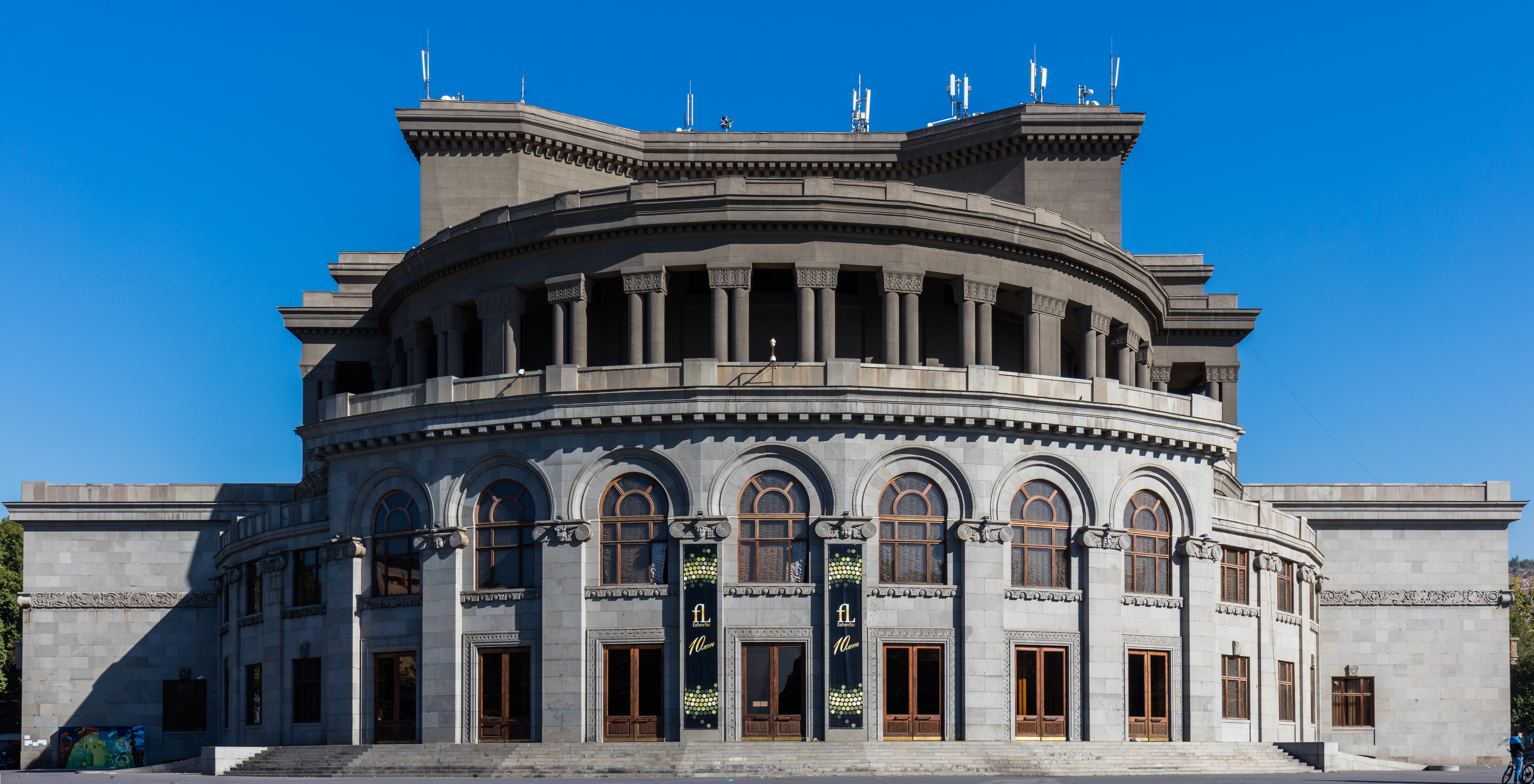
Yerevan Opera Theater

Jazz, classical, folk and traditional music are among several genres that are popular in the city of Yerevan. A large number of ensembles, orchestras and choirs of different types of Armenian and international music are active in the city.

The Armenian Philharmonic Orchestra founded in 1925, is one of the oldest musical groups in Yerevan and modern Armenia. The Armenian National Radio Chamber Choir founded in 1929, won the First Prize of the Soviet Union in the 1931 competition of choirs among the republics of the Soviet Union. Folk and classical music of Armenia was taught in state-sponsored conservatoires during the Soviet days. The Sayat-Nova Armenian Folk Song Ensemble was founded in Yerevan in 1938. Currently directed by Tovmas Poghosyan, the ensemble performs the works of prominent Armenian gusans such as Sayat-Nova, Jivani, and Sheram.

In 1939, the Armenian National Academic Theatre of Opera and Ballet was opened. It is home to the Aram Khatchaturian concert hall and the Alexander Spendiarian auditorium of the National Theatre of Opera and Ballet.

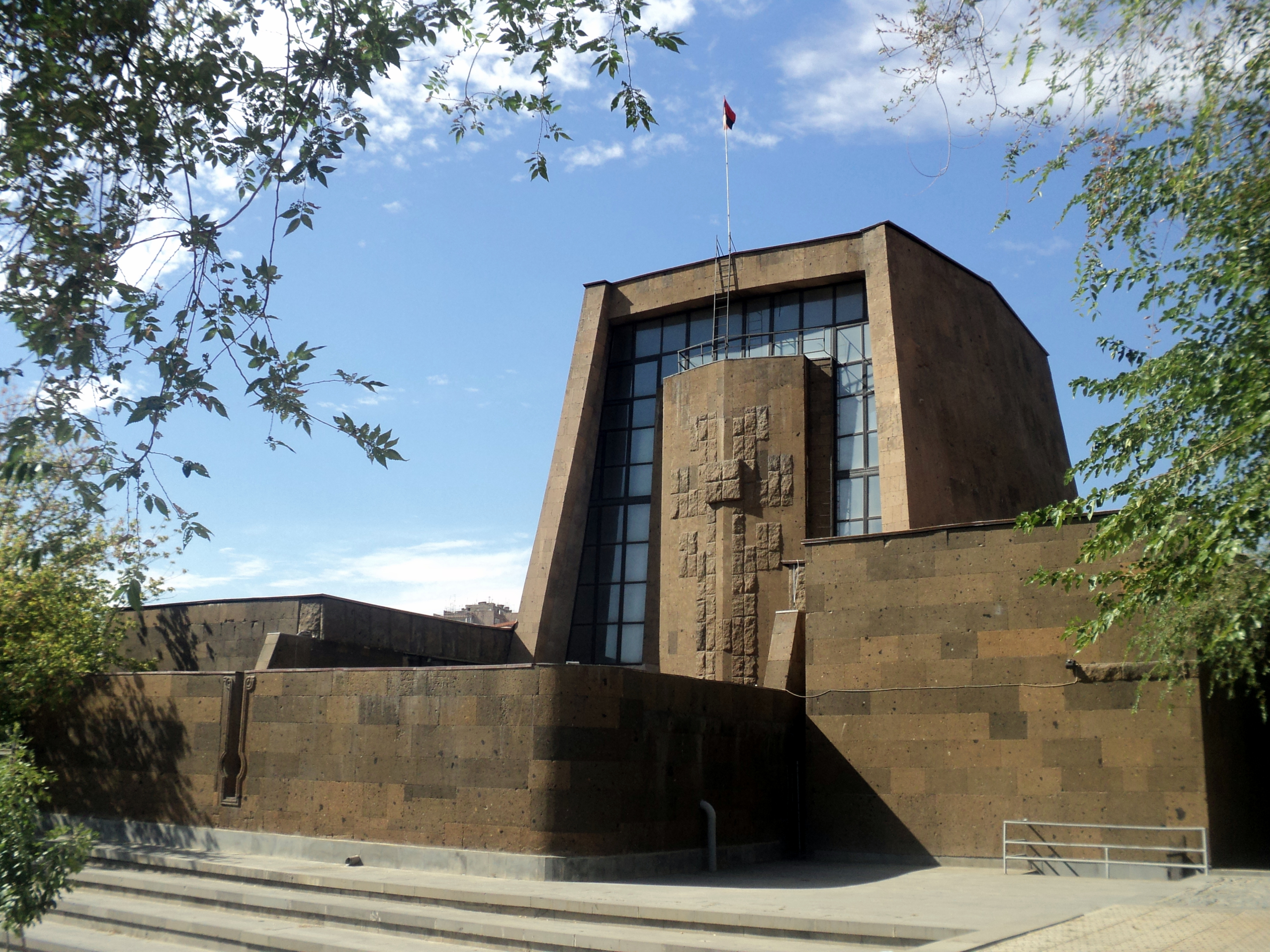
Komitas Chamber Music House

The Komitas Chamber Music House opened in 1977, is the home of chamber music performers and lovers in Armenia. In 1983, the Karen Demirchyan Sports and Concerts Complex was opened. It is currently the largest indoor venue in Armenia.

The National Chamber Orchestra of Armenia (founded in 1961), Yerevan State Brass Band (1964), Folk Instruments Orchestra of Armenia (1977), Gusan and Folk Song Ensemble of Armenia (1983), Hover Chamber Choir (1992), Shoghaken Folk Ensemble (1995), Yerevan State Chamber Choir (1996), State Orchestra of Armenian National Instruments (2004), and the Youth State Orchestra of Armenia (2005), are also among the famous musical ensembles of the city of Yerevan. The Ars lunga piano-cello duo achieved international fame since its foundation in 2009 in Yerevan.

Armenian religious music remained liturgical until Komitas introduced polyphony by the end of the 19th century. Starting from the late 1950s, religious music became widely spread when Armenian chants (also known as sharakans) were performed by the soprano Lusine Zakaryan.The state-run Tagharan Ensemble of Yerevan founded in 1981 and currently directed by Sedrak Yerkanian, also performs ritual and ancient Armenian music.

Jazz is also among the popular genres in Yerevan. The first jazz band in Yerevan was founded in 1936. Currently, many jazz and ethno jazz bands are active in Yerevan such as Time Report, Art Voices, and Nuance Jazz Band. The Malkhas jazz club founded by renowned artist Levon Malkhasian, is among the most popular clubs in the city. The Yerevan Jazz Fest is an annual jazz festival taking place every autumn since 2015, organised by the Armenian Jazz Association with the support of the Yerevan Municipality.

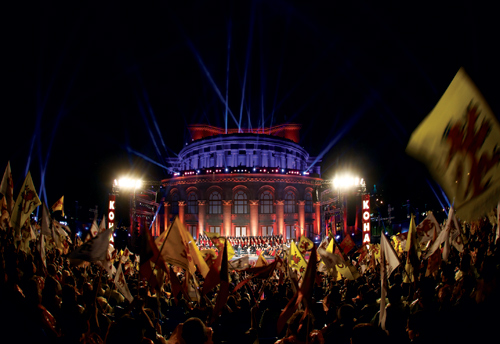
KOHAR performing at the Freedom Square in 2011

Armenian rock has been originated in Yerevan in the mid-1960s, mainly through Arthur Meschian and his band Arakyalner (Disciples). In the early 1970s, there were a range of professional bands in Yerevan strong enough to compete with their Soviet counterparts. In post-Soviet Armenia, an Armenian progressive rock scene has been developed in Yerevan, mainly through Vahan Artsruni, the Oaksenham rock band, and the Dorians band. The Armenian Navy Band founded by Arto Tunçboyacıyan in 1998 is also famous for jazz, avant-garde and folk music. Reggae is also becoming popular in Yerevan mainly through the Reincarnation musical band.

The Cafesjian Center for the Arts is known for its regularly programmed events including the "Cafesjian Classical Music Series" on the first Wednesday of each month, and the "Music Cascade" series of jazz, pop and rock music live concerts performed every Friday and Saturday.

Open-air concerts are frequently held in curtain location in Yerevan during summer, such as the Cafesjian Sculpture Garden on Tamanyan Street, the Freedom Square near the Opera House, the Republic Square, etc. The famous KOHAR Symphony Orchestra and Choir occasionally performs open-air concerts in the city.

==== Dance ====
Traditional dancing is very popular among Armenians. During the cool summertime of the Yerevan city, it is very common to find people dancing in groups at Northern Avenue or Tamanyan Street near the cascade.

Professional dance groups were formed in Yerevan during the Soviet days. The first group was the Armenian Folk Music and Dance Ensemble founded in 1938 by Tatul Altunyan. It was followed by the State Dance Ensemble of Armenia in 1958. In 1963, the Berd Dance Ensemble was formed. The Barekamutyun State Dance Ensemble of Armenia was founded in 1987 by Norayr Mehrabyan.

The Karin Traditional Song and Dance Ensemble founded in 2001 by Gagik Ginosyan is known for revitalising and performing the ancient Armenian dances of the historical regions of the Armenian Highlands, such as Hamshen, Mush, Sasun, Karin, etc.

==== Theatre ====
Yerevan is home to many theatre groups, mainly operating under the support of the ministry of culture. Theatre halls in the city organise several shows and performances throughout the year. Most prominent state-run theatres of Yerevan are the Sundukyan State Academic Theatre, Paronyan Musical Comedy Theatre, Stanislavski Russian Theatre, Hrachya Ghaplanyan Drama Theatre, and the Sos Sargsyan Hamazgayin State Theatre. The Edgar Elbakyan Theatre of Drama and Comedy is among the prominent theatres run by the private sector.

Yerevan is also home to several specialised theatres such as the Tumanyan Puppet Theatre, Yerevan State Pantomime Theatre, the Yerevan State Marionettes Theatre, and Arten Theatre.

==== Cinema ====
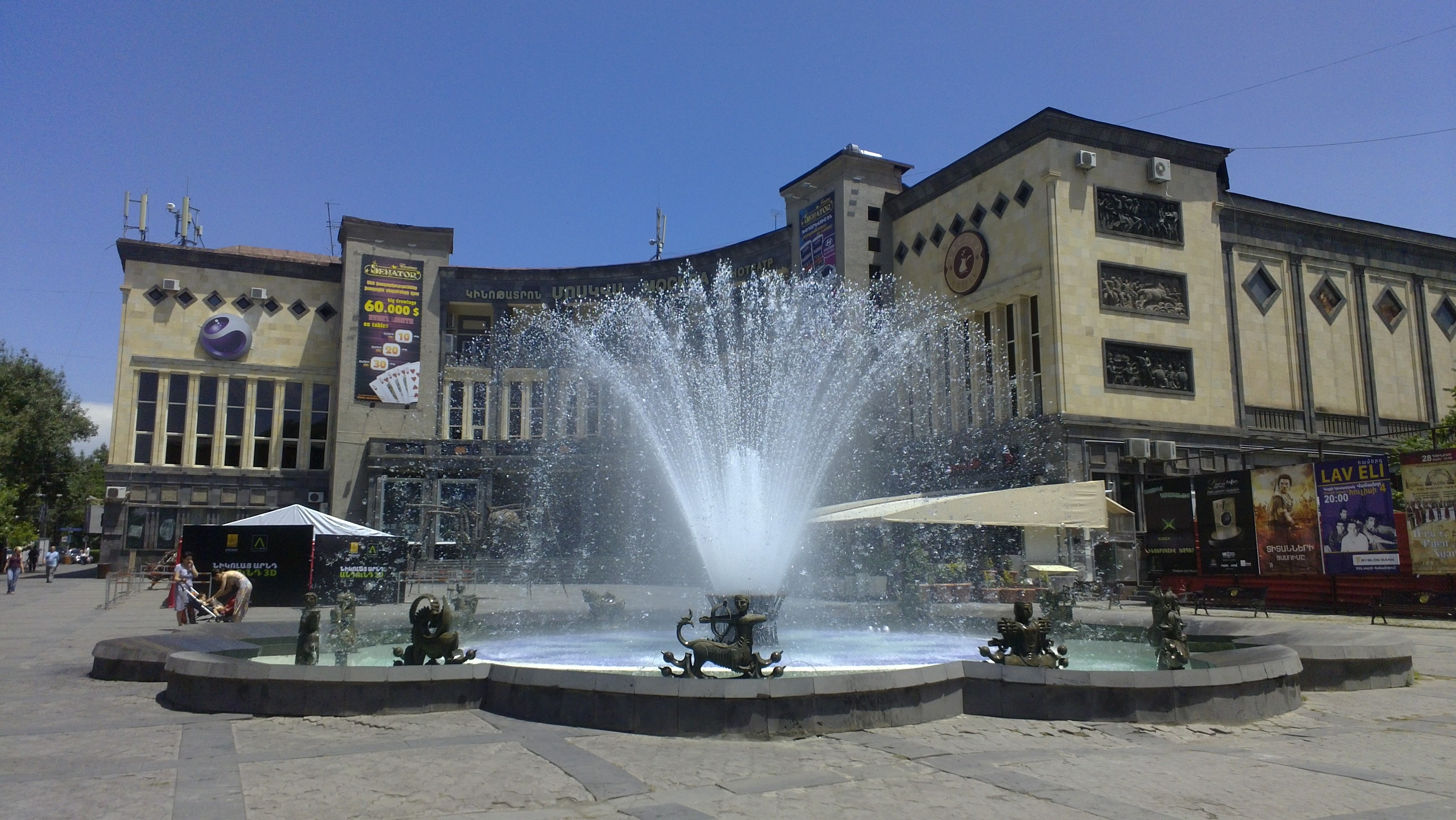
Moscow Cinema

Cinema in Armenia was born on 16 April 1923, when the Armenian State Committee of Cinema was established upon a decree issued by the Soviet Armenian government.

In March 1924, the first Armenian film studio; Armenfilm (Armenian: Հայֆիլմ "Hayfilm", Russian: Арменкино "Armenkino") was opened in Yerevan, starting with a documentary film called Soviet Armenia. Namus was the first Armenian silent black and white film, directed by Hamo Beknazarian in 1925, based on a play of Alexander Shirvanzade, describing the ill fate of two lovers, who were engaged by their families to each other since childhood, but because of violations of namus (a tradition of honour), the girl was married by her father to another person. The first produced sound film was Pepo directed by Hamo Beknazarian in 1935.

Yerevan is home to many movie theatres including the Moscow Cinema, Nairi Cinema, Hayastan Cinema, Cinema Star multiplex cinemas of the Dalma Garden Mall, and the KinoPark multiplex cinemas of Yerevan Mall. The city also hosts a number of film festivals:

- The Golden Apricot Yerevan International Film Festival has been hosted by the Moscow Cinema annually since 2004.
- The ReAnimania International Animation Film & Comics Art Festival of Yerevan launched in 2005, is also among the popular annual events in the city.
- The Sose International Film Festival has been held annually by the Zis Center of Culture since 2014.

=== Festivals ===
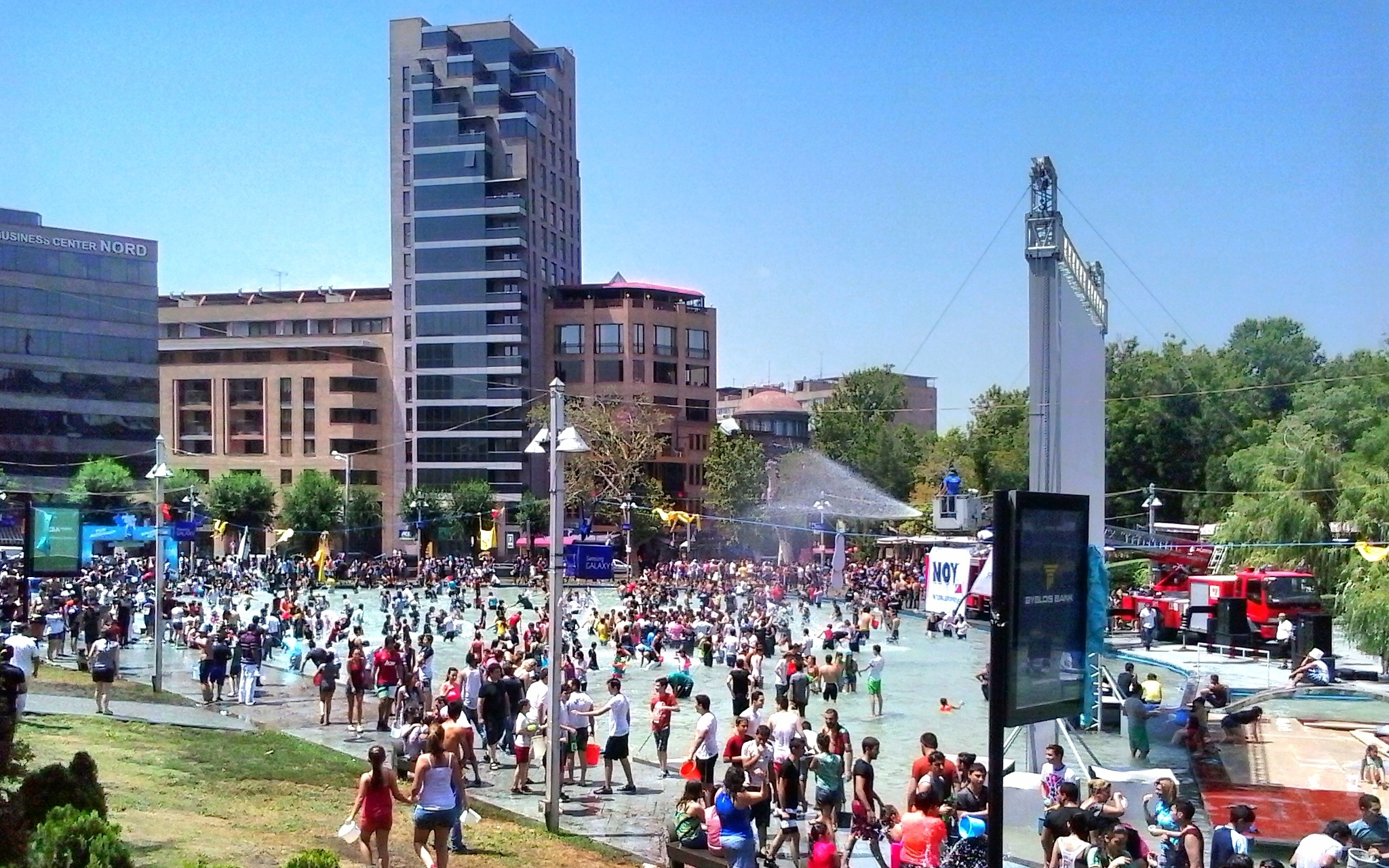
People celebrating Vardavar water festival in downtown Yerevan

In addition to the film and other arts festivals, the city organises many public celebrations that greatly attract the locals as well as the visitors. Vardavar is the most widely celebrated festival among Armenians, having it roots back to the pagan history of Armenia. It is celebrated 98 days (14 weeks) after Easter. During the day of Vardavar, people from a wide array of ages are allowed to douse strangers with water. It is common to see people pouring buckets of water from balconies on unsuspecting people walking below them. The Swan Lake of the Yerevan Opera is the most popular venue for the Vardavar celebrations.

In August 2015, Teryan Cultural Centre supported by the Yerevan Municipality has launched its first Armenian traditional clothing festival known as the Yerevan Taraz Fest.

As one of the ancient winemaking regions, many wine festivals are celebrated in Armenia. Yerevan launched its first annual wine festivals known as the Yerevan Wine Days in May 2016. The Watermelon Fest launched in 2013 is also becoming a popular event in the city. The Yerevan Beer Fest is held annually during the month of August. It was first organised in 2014.

=== Media ===
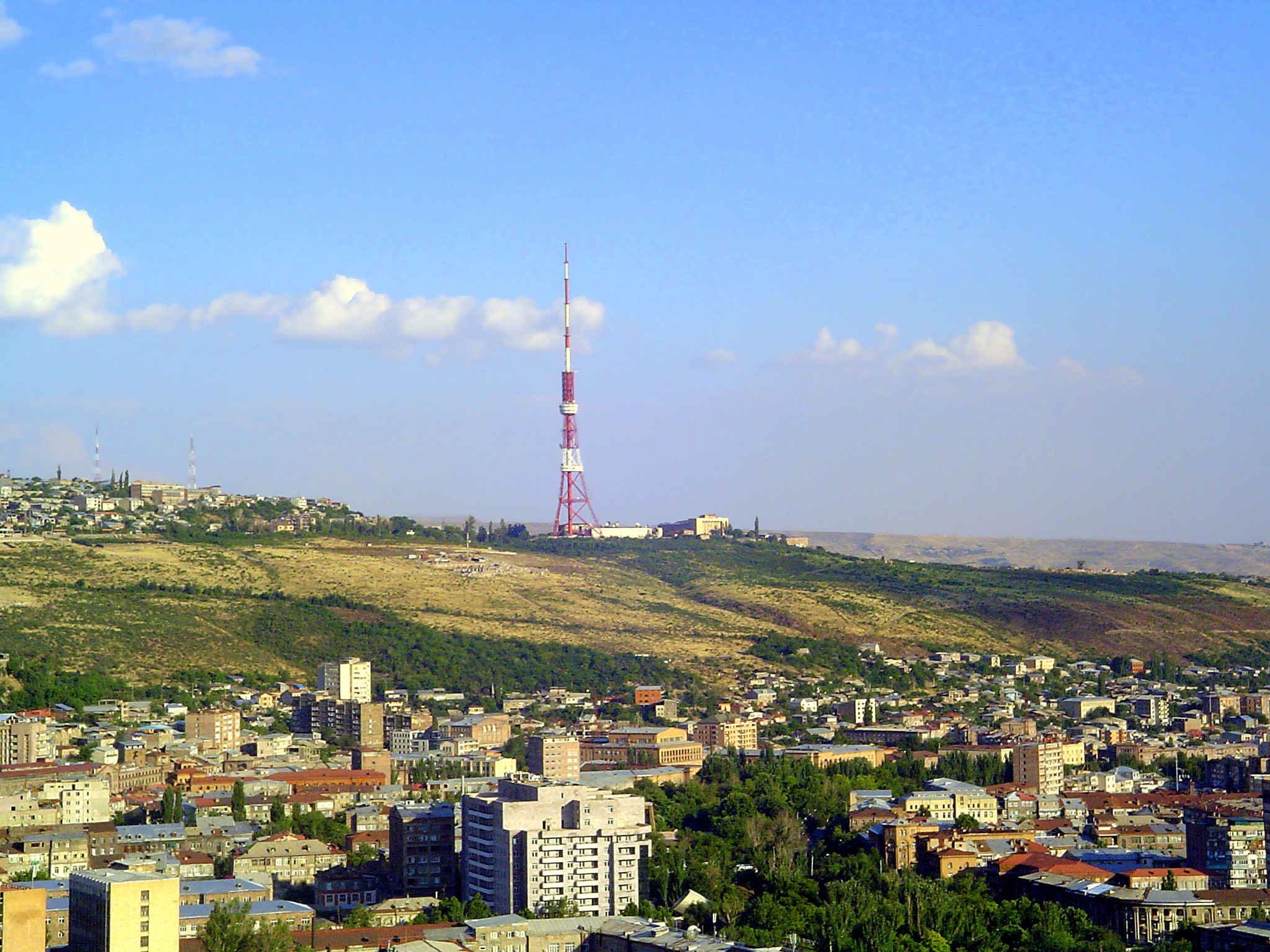
Yerevan TV Tower

Many public and private TV and radio channels operate in Yerevan. The Public TV of Armenia has been in service since 1956. It became a satellite television in 1996. Other satellite TVs include the Armenia TV owned by the Pan-Armenian Media Group, Kentron TV owned by Gagik Tsarukyan, Shant TV and Shant TV premium. On the other hand, Yerkir Media, Armenia 2, Shoghakat TV, Yerevan TV, 21TV and the TV channels of the Pan-Armenian Media Group are among the most notable local televisions of Yerevan.

Notable newspapers published in Yerevan include the daily newspapers of Aravot, Azg, Golos Armenii and Hayastani Hanrapetutyun.

=== Monuments ===
==== Historic ====
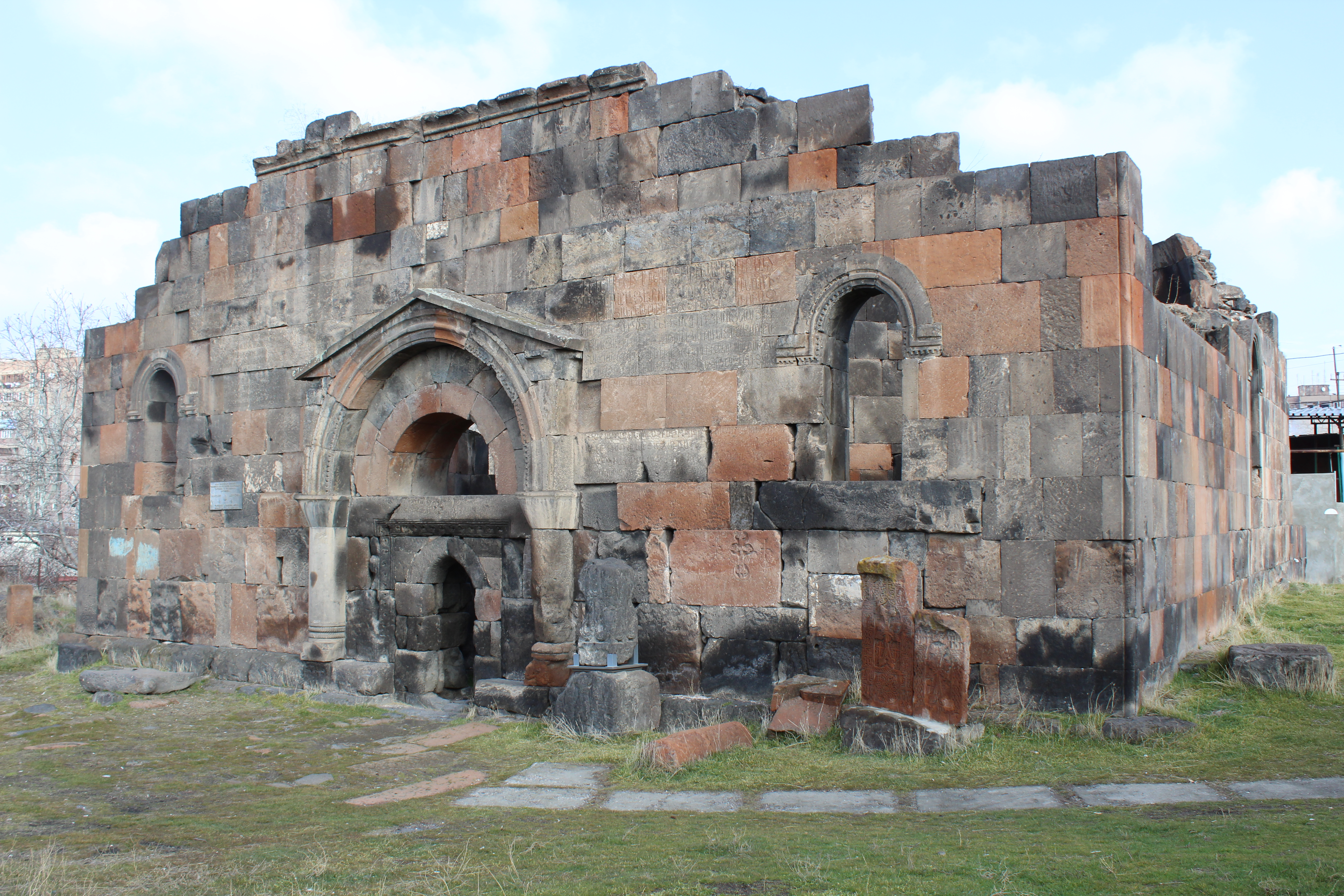
Cathedral of Avan built in 591

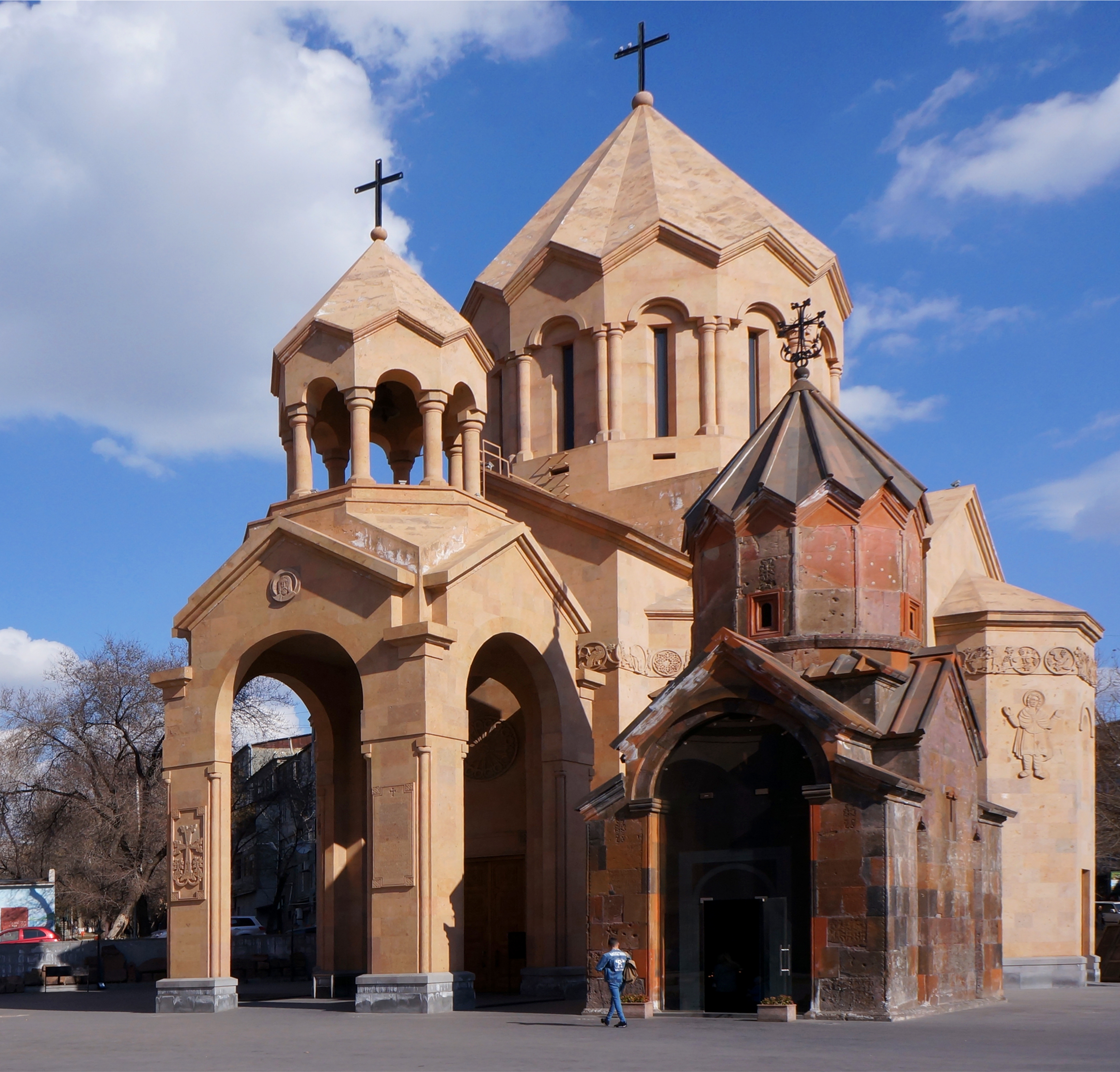
Katoghike Church in Yerevan

Zoravor Surp Astvatsatsin Church

Many of the structures of Yerevan had been destroyed either during foreign invasions or as a result of the devastating earthquake in 1679. However, some structures have remained moderately intact and were renovated during the following years.

Erebuni Fortress, also known as Arin Berd, is the hill where the city of Yerevan was founded in 782 BC by King Argishti I. The remains of other structures from earlier periods are also found in Shengavit.

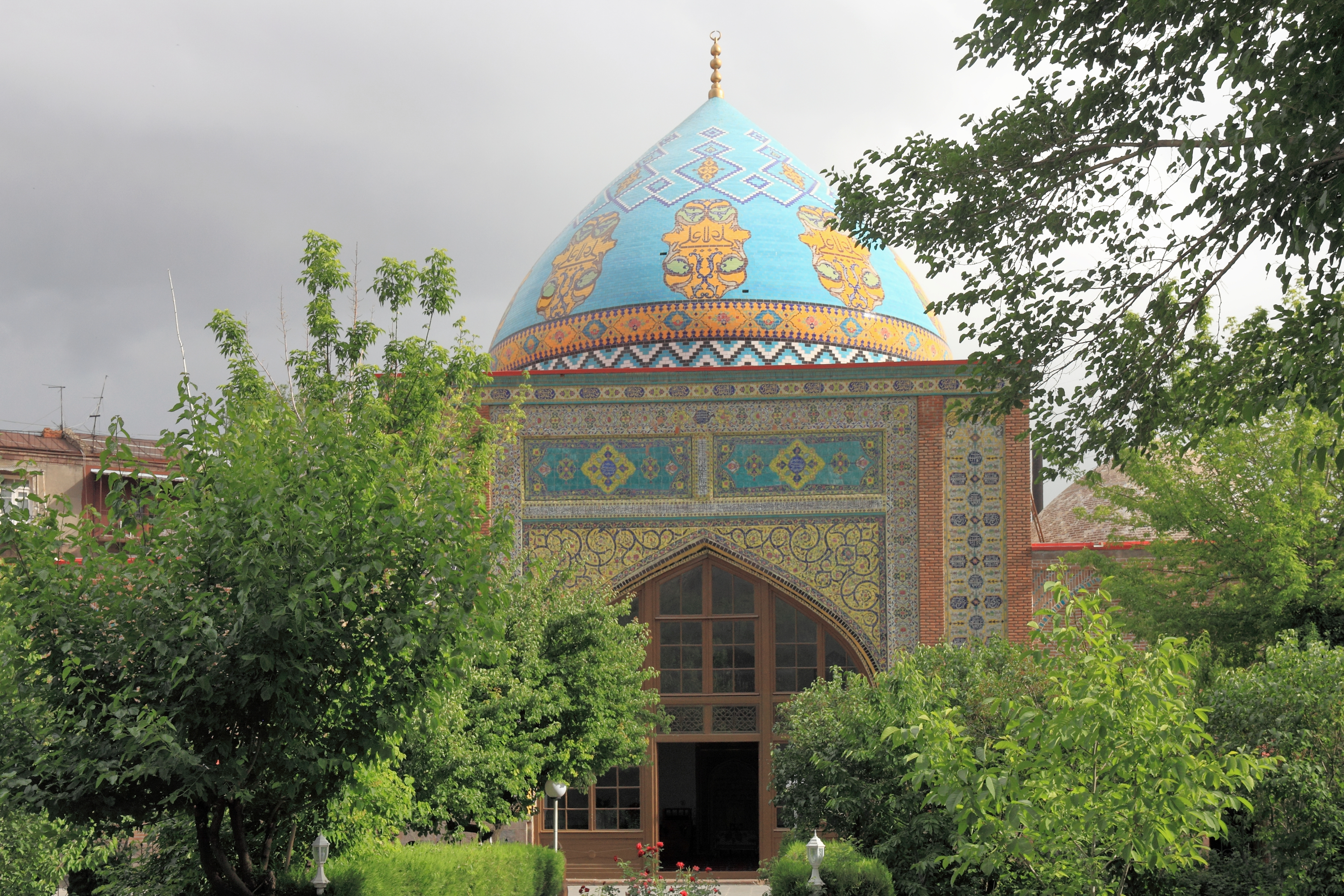
The Blue Mosque

The 4th-century chapel of the Holy Mother of God and the 6th-century Tsiranavor Church both located in Avan District at the north of Yerevan, are among the oldest surviving Christian structures of the city. Originally a suburb at the north of Yerevan, Avan was eventually absorbed by the city's gradual expansion. The district is also home to the remains of Surp Hovhannes Chapel dating back to the 12–13th centuries.

Katoghike Church; a medieval chapel (a section of once much larger basilica) in the centre of Yerevan, built in 1264, is one of the best preserved churches of the city. Zoravor Surp Astvatsatsin Church is also among the best surviving churches of Yerevan, built 1693–94 right after the devastating earthquake, on the ruins of a medieval church. Saint Sarkis Cathedral rebuilt in 1835–42, is the seat of Araratian Pontifical Diocese of the Armenian Apostolic Church.

The Blue Mosque or "Gök Jami", built between 1764 and 1768 at the centre of the city, is currently the only operating mosque in Armenia.

The Red Bridge of Hrazdan River is a 17th-century structure, built after the 1679 earthquake and later reconstructed in 1830.

==== Contemporary ====
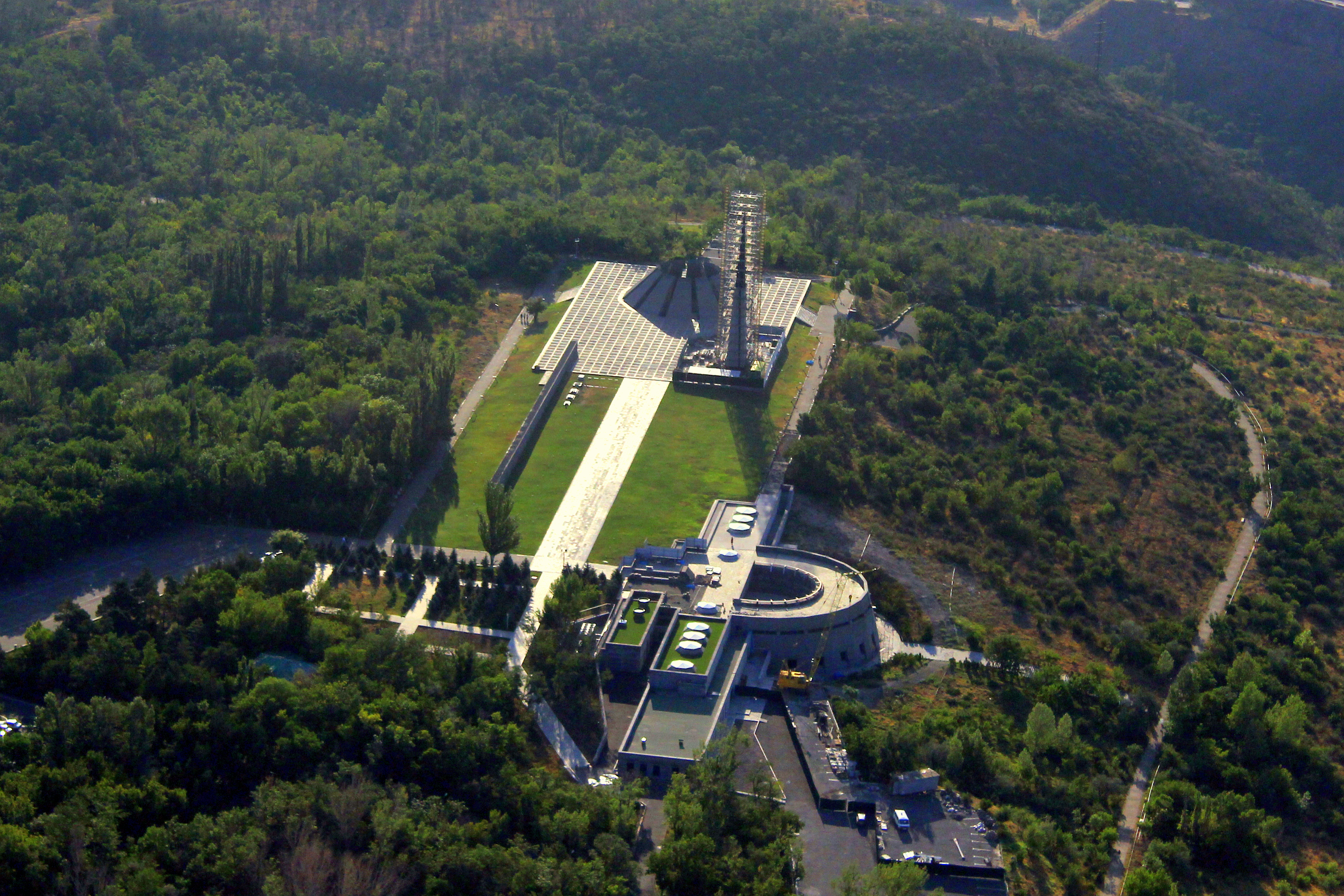
Aerial view of Tsitsernakaberd memorial and the genocide museum

Yerevan Opera Theater or the Armenian National Academic Opera and Ballet Theatre opened in 1933, is a major landmark in the city along with the Mesrop Mashtots Matenadaran opened in 1959, and Tsitsernakaberd monument of the Armenian genocide opened in 1967.

Moscow Cinema, opened in 1937 on the site of Saint Paul and Peter Church of the 5th century, is an important example of the Soviet-era architecture. In 1959, Yervand Kochar's monument dedicated to the legendary Armenian hero David of Sassoun was erected near the Yerevan Railway Station. The monumental statue of Mother Armenia is a female personification of the Armenian nation, erected in 1967.

Komitas Pantheon is a cemetery opened in 1936 where many famous Armenians are buried, while the Yerablur Pantheon, is a military cemetery where over 1,000 Armenian martyrs of the Nagorno-Karabakh conflict are buried since 1990.

Many new notable buildings were constructed after the independence of Armenia such as the Yerevan Cascade, and the Saint Gregory Cathedral opened in 2001 to commemorate the 1700th anniversary of Christianity in Armenia. In May 2016, a monumental statue of the prominent Armenian statesman and military leader Garegin Nzhdeh was erected at the centre of Yerevan.

== Transportation ==
=== Air ===
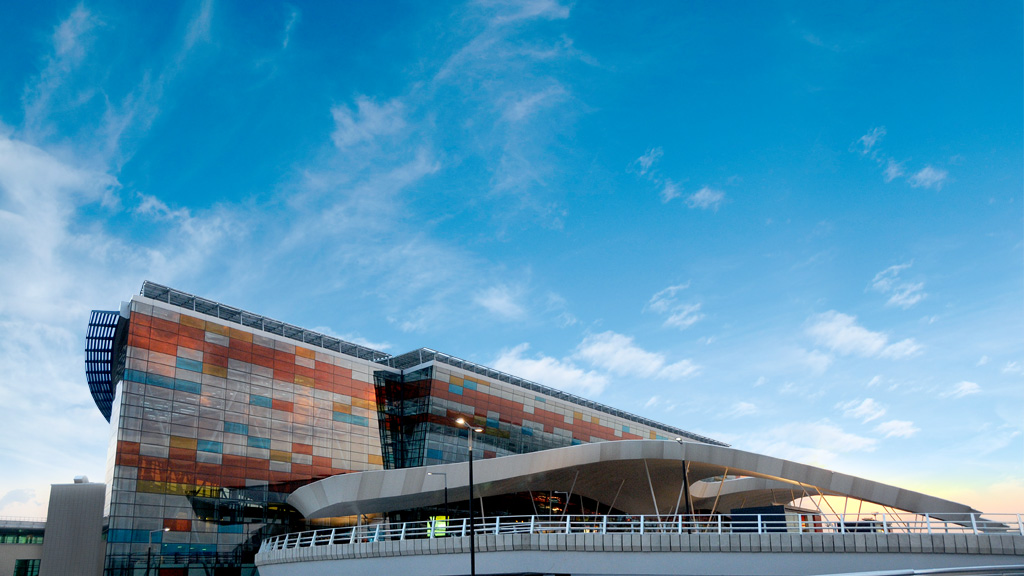
The main entrance to the Zvartnots Airport

Yerevan is served by the Zvartnots International Airport, located 12 kilometres (7 miles) west of the city centre.

A second airport, Erebuni Airport, is located just south of the city. Since the independence, "Erebuni" is mainly used for military or private flights. The Armenian Air Force has equally installed its base there and there are several MiG-29s stationed on Erebuni's tarmac.

=== City buses, public vans and trolleybuses ===
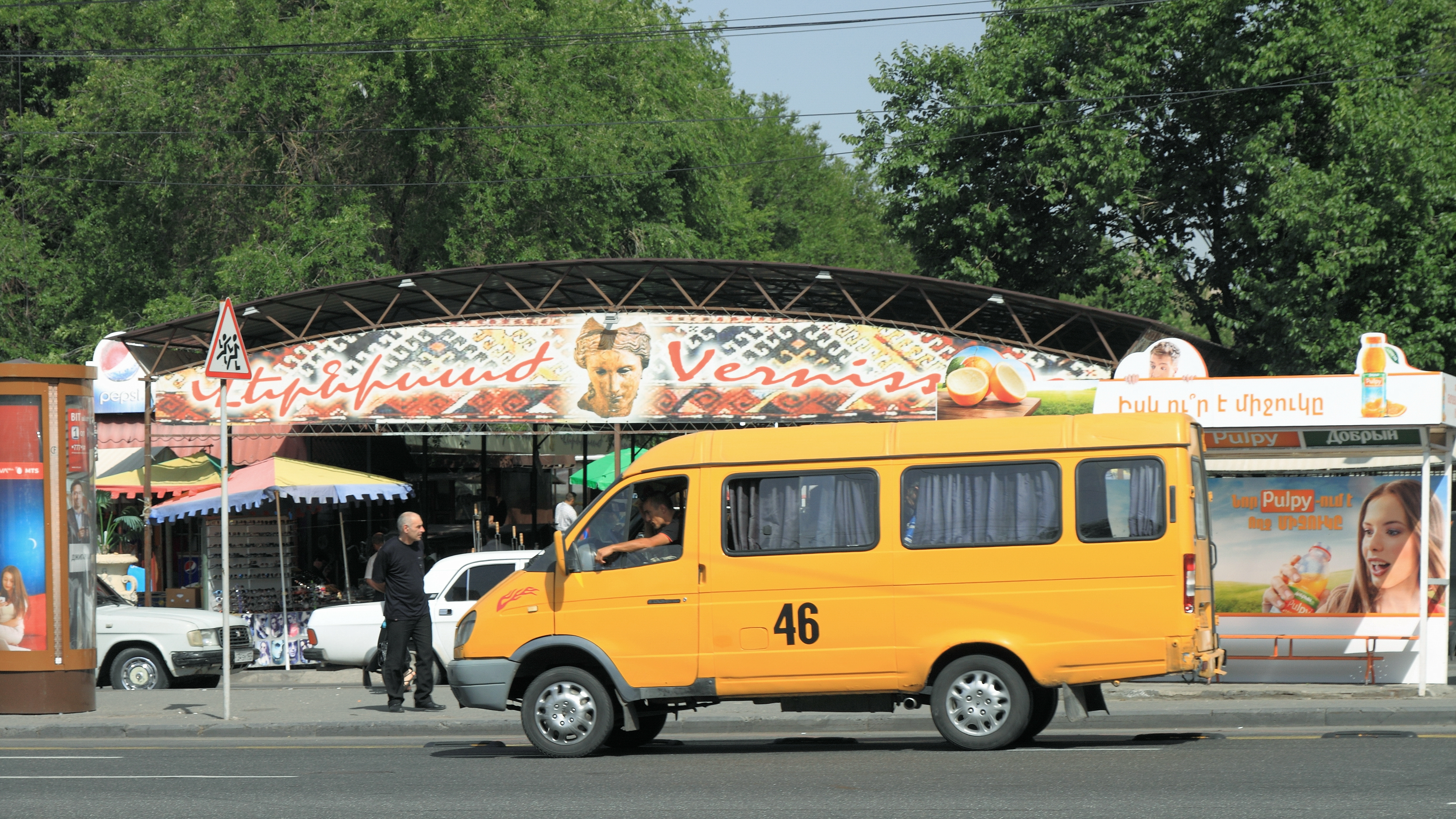
A marshrutka

Public transport in Yerevan is primarily operated by companies under the authority of the Yerevan Municipality, including Yerevan Bus CJSC, Yerevan Electric Transport CJSC and the Karen Demirchyan Yerevan Metro. The city's public transport system underwent a major restructuring and fleet renewal during the 2020s, replacing much of the ageing bus and minibus fleet and transferring routes previously operated by private companies to municipal operation.

As of 2026, Yerevan has 64 intra-city bus routes, served by a fleet of 752 buses. Around 632 buses operate on weekdays and 502 on weekends and public holidays. The routes are operated by Yerevan Bus CJSC. Between 2020 and 2024, the municipality acquired 749 small-, medium- and large-capacity buses, comprising 100 GAZelle City buses, 562 Zhongtong buses and 87 MAN buses. The fleet also includes older Higer buses on several routes. A batch of 171 Zhongtong buses acquired in 2024 entered service in January 2025, replacing older vehicles and allowing a number of routes previously served by private operators to be transferred to municipal operation.

Minibuses, locally known as marshrutkas, formerly accounted for a large share of public transport in Yerevan. Their use has been substantially reduced as part of the city's transport reform, and the older Russian-made GAZelle minibuses have been withdrawn from service. As of 2026, 11 minibus routes remain, using 94 newer GAZelle City vehicles, of which around 81 operate on weekdays. These routes are also operated by Yerevan Bus CJSC. The municipality plans to replace the remaining minibus services with larger city buses as the new route network is implemented.

The Yerevan trolleybus system has operated since 1949. The fleet underwent a major renewal between 2022 and 2026. Thirty new trolleybuses were acquired between 2022 and 2024, followed by 45 additional Yutong trolleybuses which entered service in June 2026. With their introduction, all of the remaining older trolleybuses were withdrawn from regular service. As of 2026, Yerevan Electric Transport CJSC operates a fleet of 75 trolleybuses, consisting of 60 Yutong and 15 Zhongtong vehicles, on five routes designated T1 to T5. The newer trolleybuses are equipped with batteries that allow them to operate on sections without overhead wires.

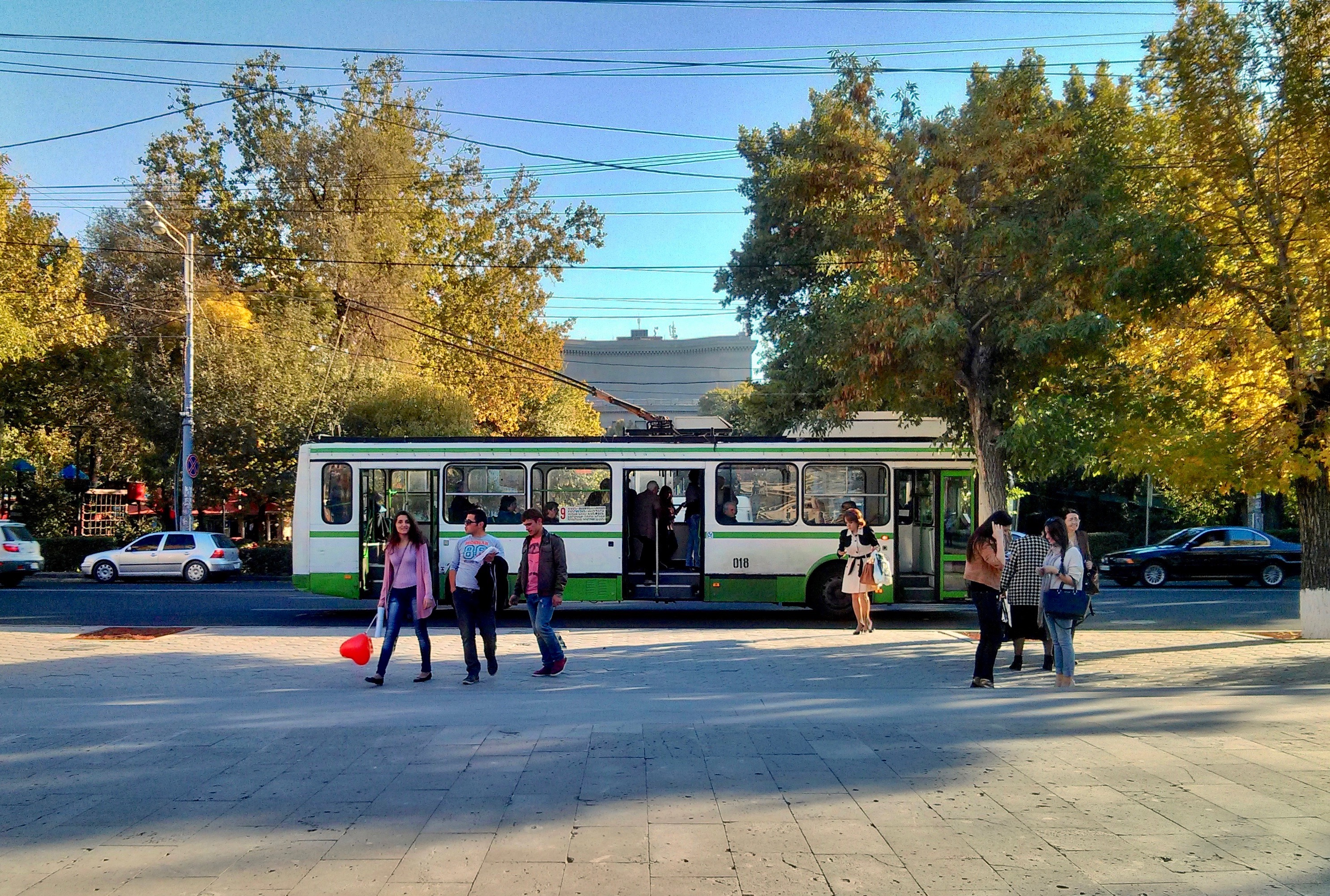
A trolleybus in Yerevan

The tram network that had operated in Yerevan since 1906 was decommissioned in January 2004. Its operation had a cost 2.4 times higher than the generated revenue, which led the municipality to shut down the network, despite a last attempt to preserve it towards the end of 2003. Following the closure, the tracks were dismantled.

A unified electronic ticketing system was introduced for Yerevan's buses, minibuses, trolleybuses and metro and became fully operational on 1 January 2025. Direct cash payments to drivers were discontinued in November 2024, and cash payments inside public transport were abolished entirely from January 2025. Passengers can pay using contactless bank cards, reusable transport cards or mobile tickets. Single-use paper tickets containing QR codes were initially available under the system but were withdrawn from circulation on 1 August 2025. The unified system also allows passengers to purchase time-based and period passes valid across buses, trolleybuses and the metro.

The central bus station in the Nor Kilikia neighbourhood serves as one of the principal terminals for inter-city and international bus transport, with services connecting Yerevan to cities throughout Armenia and destinations abroad, including Tbilisi and Tabriz.

=== Underground ===
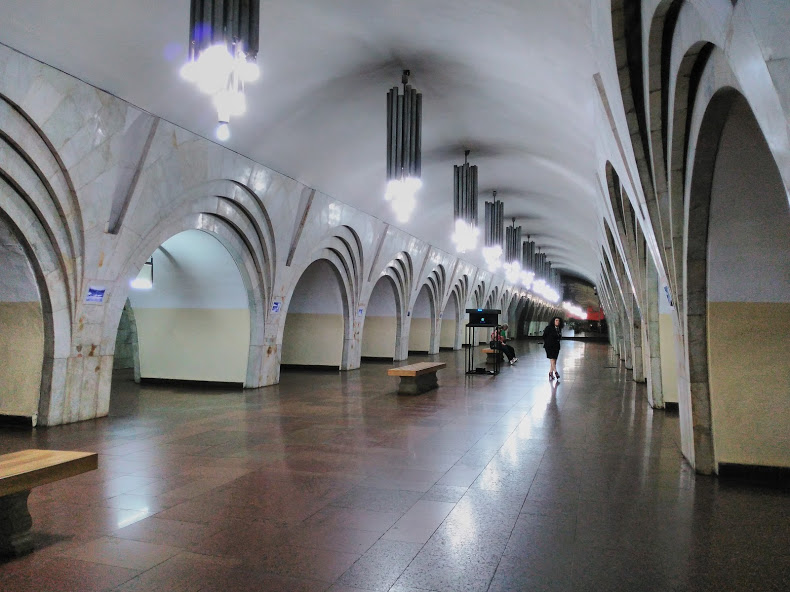
The Republic Square underground station

The Yerevan Metro named after Karen Demirchyan, (Armenian: Կարեն Դեմիրճյանի անվան Երեւանի մետրոպոլիտեն կայարան (Karen Dyemirchyani anvan Yerevani metropoliten kayaran)) is a rapid transit system that serves the capital city since 1981. It has a single line of 12.1 km (7.5 mi) length with 10 active stations and 45 units in service. The interiors of the stations resemble that of the former western Soviet nations, with chandeliers hanging from the corridors. The metro stations had most of their names changed after the collapse of the Soviet Union and the independence of the Republic of Armenia.

A northeastern extension of the line with two new stations is currently being developed. The construction of the first station (Ajapnyak) and of the one-kilometre (0.62-mile) tunnel linking it to the rest of the network will cost US$18 million. The time of the end of the project has not yet been defined. Another long-term project is the construction of two new lines, but these have been suspended due to lack of finance.

The system transports more than 60,000 people on a daily basis.

=== Railway ===
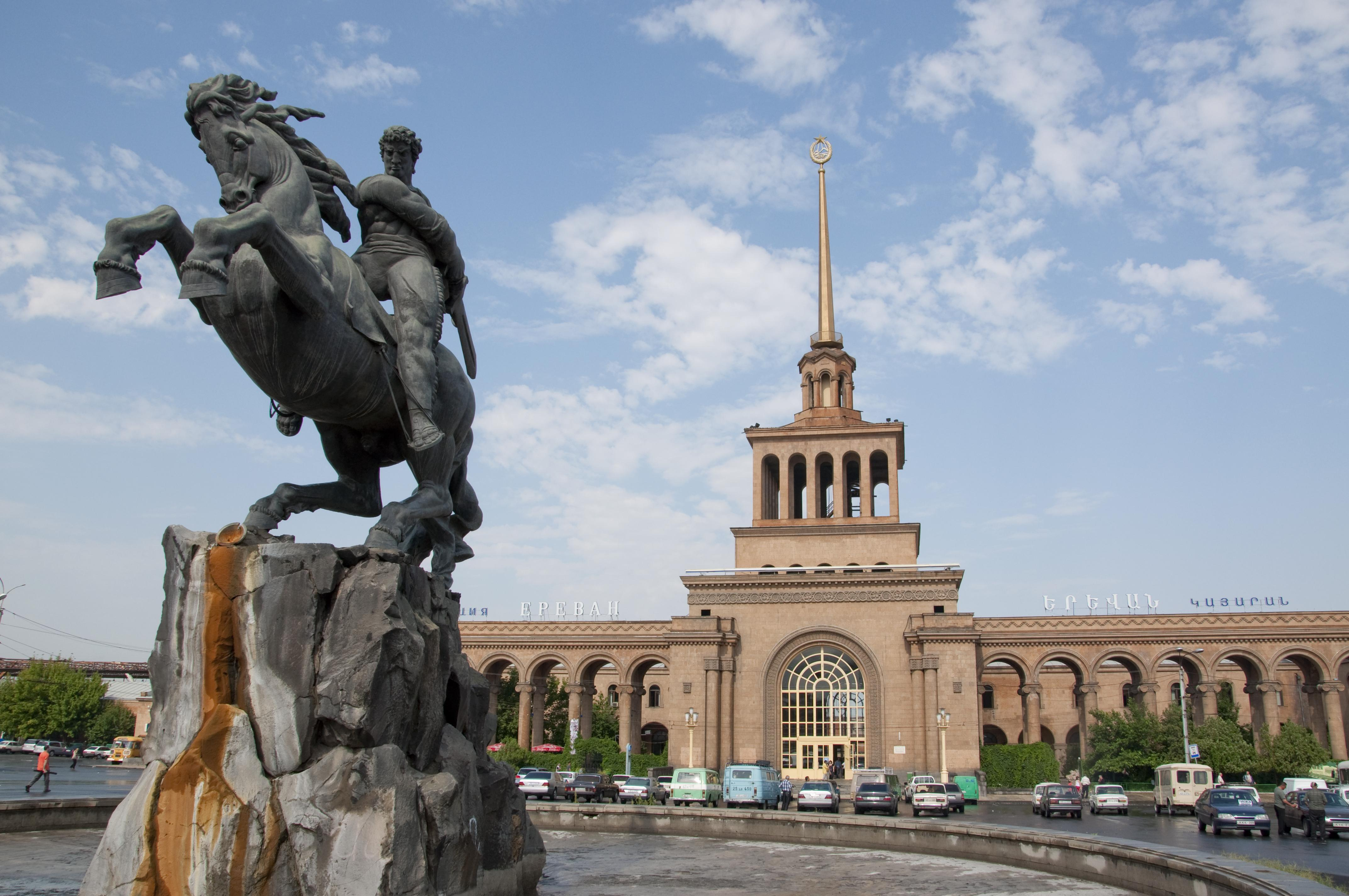
Yerevan railway station, with Yervand Kochar's statue of David of Sassoun

Yerevan has a single central railway station (several railway stations of suburbs have not been used since 1990) that is connected to the metro via the Sasuntsi Davit station. The railway station is made in Soviet-style architecture with its long point on the building roof, representing the symbols of communism: red star, hammer and sickle. Due to the Turkish and Azerbaijani blockades of Armenia, there is only one international train that passes by once every two days, with neighbouring Georgia being its destination. For a sum of 9 000 to 18 000 dram, it is possible to take the night train to the Georgian capital, Tbilisi. This train then continues to its destination of Batumi, on the shores of the Black Sea in the summer season.

The only railway that goes to Iran to the south passes by the closed border of Nakhchivan. For this reason, there are no trains that go south from Yerevan.

During the first decade of the 21st century, the South Caucasus Railway CJSC — which is the current operator of the railway system in Armenia—announced its readiness to put the Yerevan-Gyumri-Kars railway line in service in case the Armenian-Turkish protocols are ratified and the opening of the borders between the two countries is achieved.

As of July 2017, the following railway trips are scheduled from and to Yerevan:

- Yerevan-Tbilisi-Batumi-Yerevan, with a daily trip operating since 15 June 2017, in coordination with the Georgian Railways.
- Yerevan-Gyumri-Yerevan, with 3 daily trips operating since 15 June 2017.
- Yerevan-Yeraskh-Yerevan, with a daily trip operating since 12 July 2014.
- Yerevan-Araks-Yerevan, with a daily trip.
- Yerevan-Shorzha-Yerevan, with weekend trips.

The Yerevan-Ararat-Yerevan route is temporarily not in operation, while the Yerevan-Tbilisi-Yerevan route will operate starting from 2 October 2017.

=== Taxi ===
Yerevan prides itself on having connections 24/7 as taxis are available at any time of the day or night. Taxicab service companies cover the entire city in addition to many online taxi service providers, including GG Taxi, Utaxi and Yandex.Taxi.

== Economy and services ==
=== Industry ===
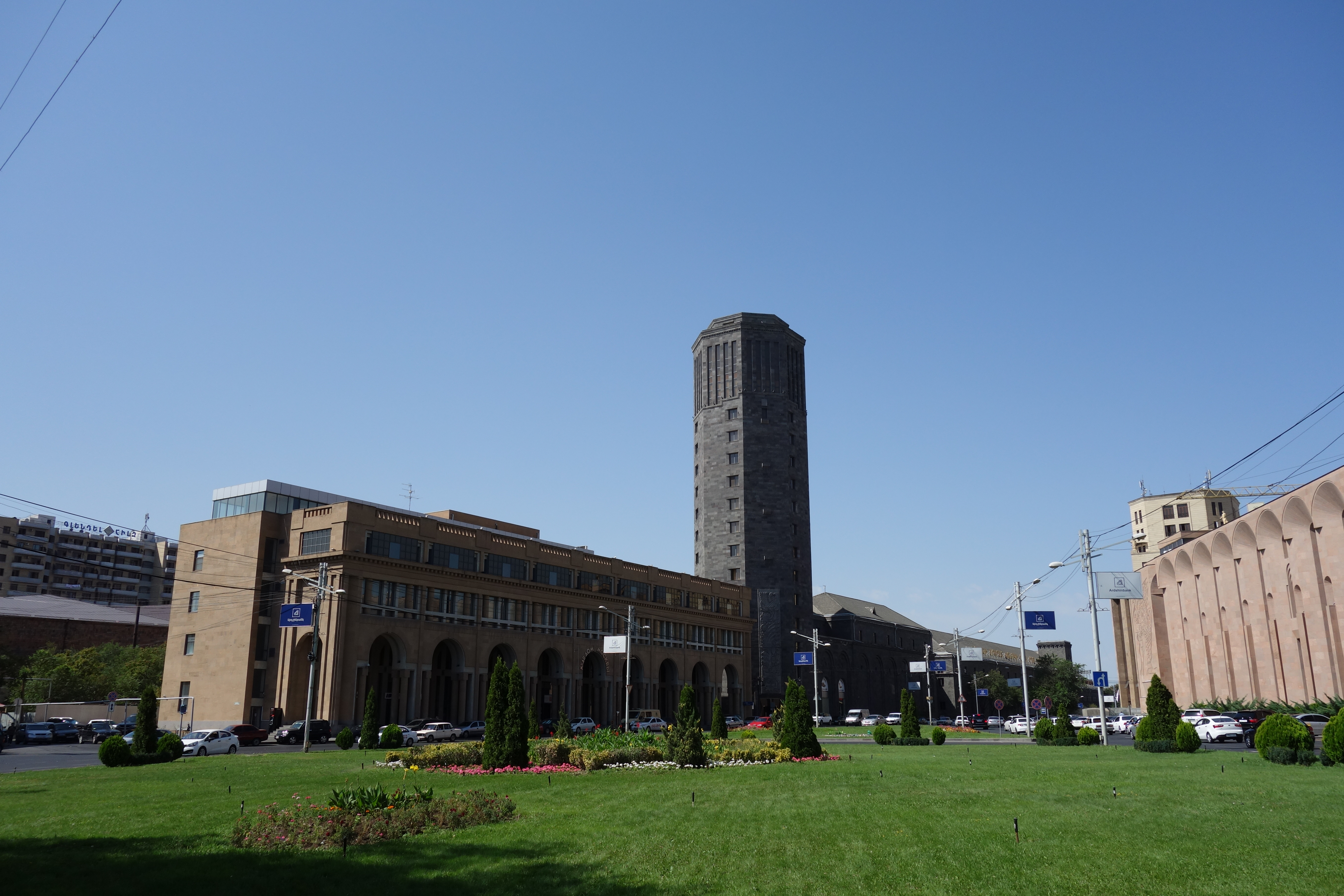
Yerevan Ararat Brandy Factory

As of 2013, the share of Yerevan in the annual total industrial product of Armenia is 41%. The industry of Yerevan is quite diversified including chemicals, primary metals and steel products, machinery, rubber products, plastics, rugs and carpets, textiles, clothing and footwear, jewellery, wood products and furniture, building materials and stone-processing, alcoholic beverages, mineral water, dairy product and processed food. Even though the economic crisis of the '90s ravaged the industry of the country, several factories remain always in service, notably in the petrochemical and the aluminium sectors.

Armenian beverages, especially Armenian cognac and beer, have a worldwide fame. Hence, Yerevan is home to many leading enterprises of Armenia and the Caucasus for the production of alcoholic beverages, such as the Yerevan Ararat Brandy Factory, Yerevan Brandy Company, Yerevan Champagne Wines Factory, "Beer of Yerevan" (Kilikia Beer) brewery, Armco Brandy Factory, Proshyan Brandy Factory and Astafian Wine-Brandy Factory. The 2 tobacco producers in Yerevan are the "Cigaronne" and "Grand Tabak" companies.

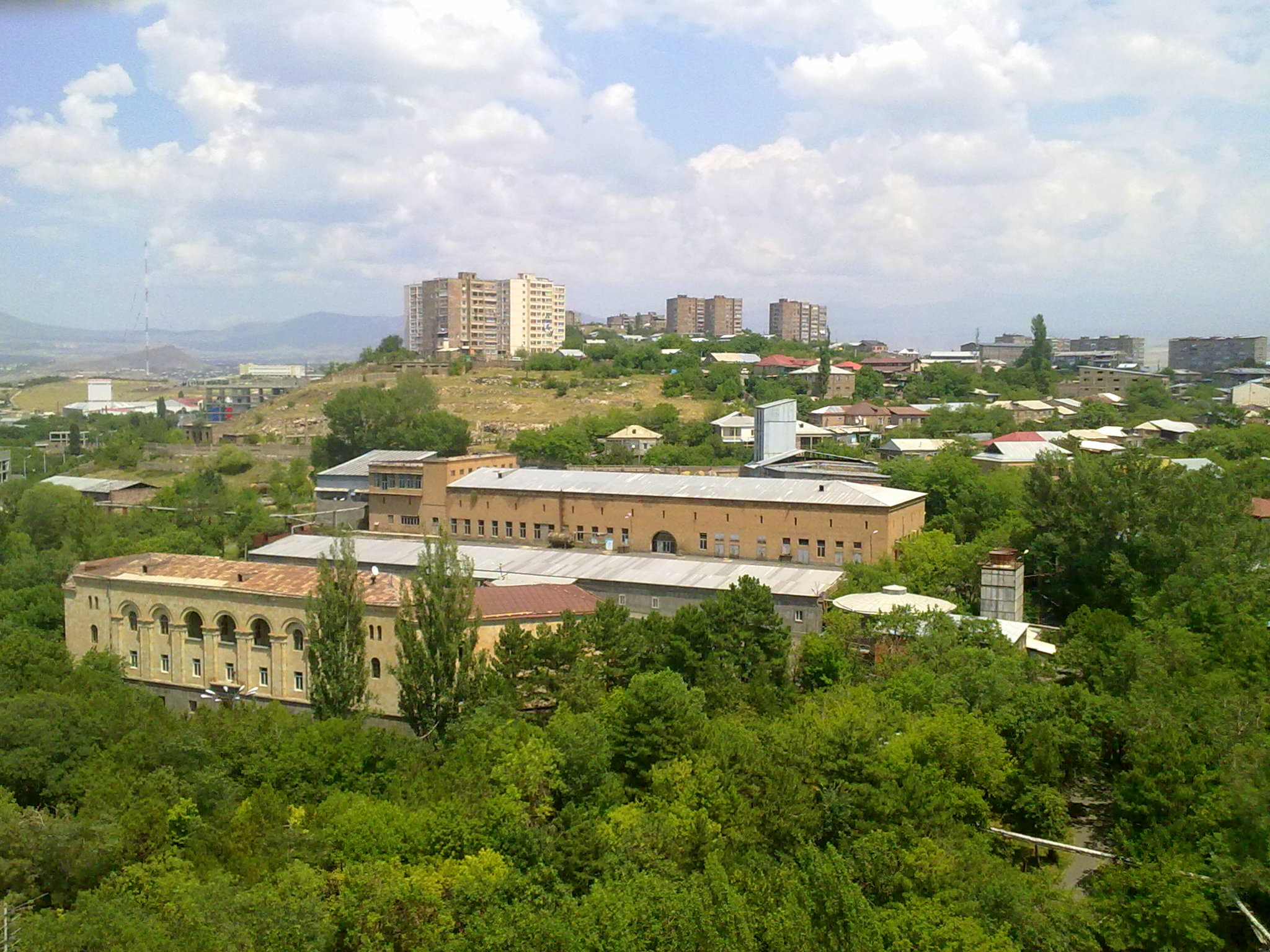
Yerevan Champagne Wines Factory

Carpet industry in Armenia has a deeply rooted history with ancient traditions, therefore, carpet production is rather developed in Yerevan with three major factories that also produce hand-made rugs. The "Megerian Carpet" factory is the leading in this sector.

Other major plants in the city include the "Nairit" chemical and rubber plant, Rusal Armenal aluminium foil mill, "Grand Candy" Armenian-Canadian confectionery manufacturers, "Arcolad" chocolate factory, "Marianna" factory for dairy products, "Talgrig Group" for wheat and flour products, "Shant" ice cream factory, "Crown Chemicals" for paints, "ATMC" travertine mining company, Yerevan Watch Factory "AWI watches", Yerevan Jewellery Plant, and the mineral water factories of "Arzni", "Sil", and "Dilijan Frolova".

Food products include processed meat, all types of canneries, wheat and flour, sweets and chocolate, dried fruits, soft drinks and beverages. Building materials mainly include travertine, crushed stones, asphalt and asphalt concrete.

=== Finance and banking ===
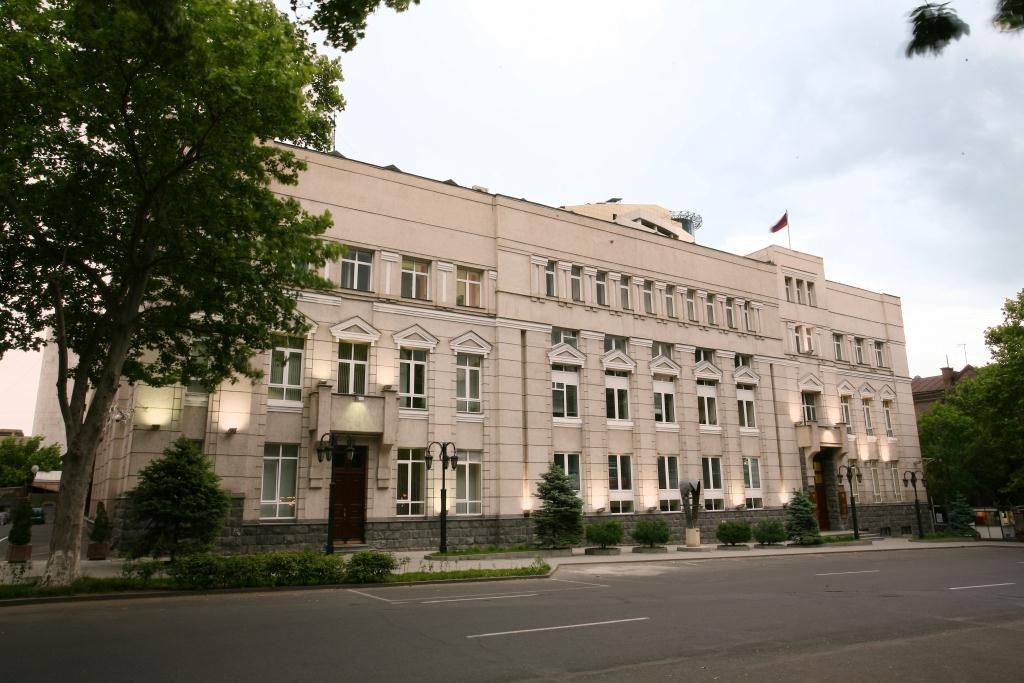
The Central Bank of Armenia

As an attractive outsourcing location for Western European, Russian and American multinationals, Yerevan headquarters many international companies. It is Armenia's financial hub, being home to the Central Bank of Armenia, the Armenian Stock Exchange (NASDAQ OMX Armenia), as well as the majority of the country's largest commercial banks. As of 2013, the city dominates over 85% of the annual total services in Armenia, as well as over 84% of the annual total retail trade.

Many subsidiaries of Russian service companies and banks operate in Yerevan, including Gazprom, Ingo Armenia, Rosgosstrakh and VTB Bank. The ACBA-Credit Agricole is a subsidiary of the French Crédit Agricole, while the HSBC Bank Armenia is also operating in Yerevan.

=== Construction ===
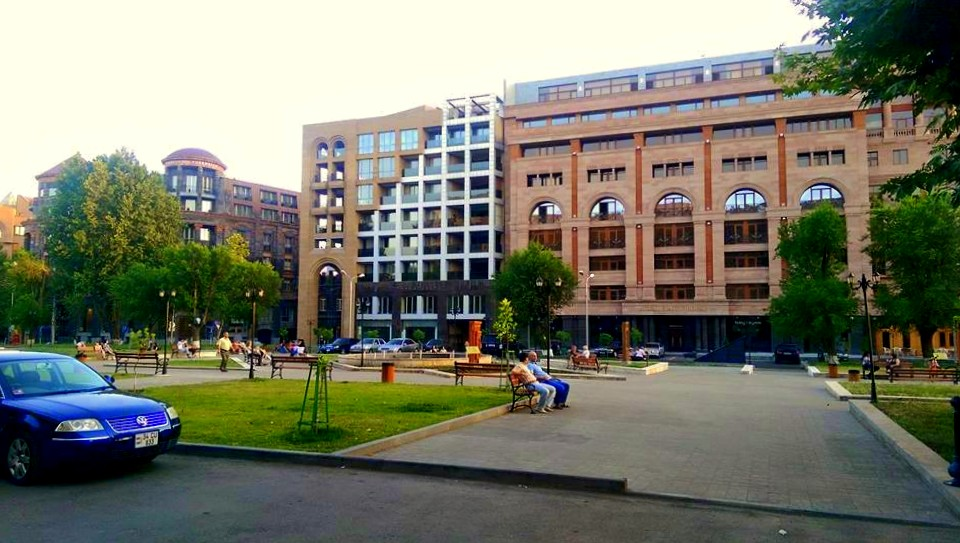
A 19th-century building in downtown Yerevan, remodelled with modern additions

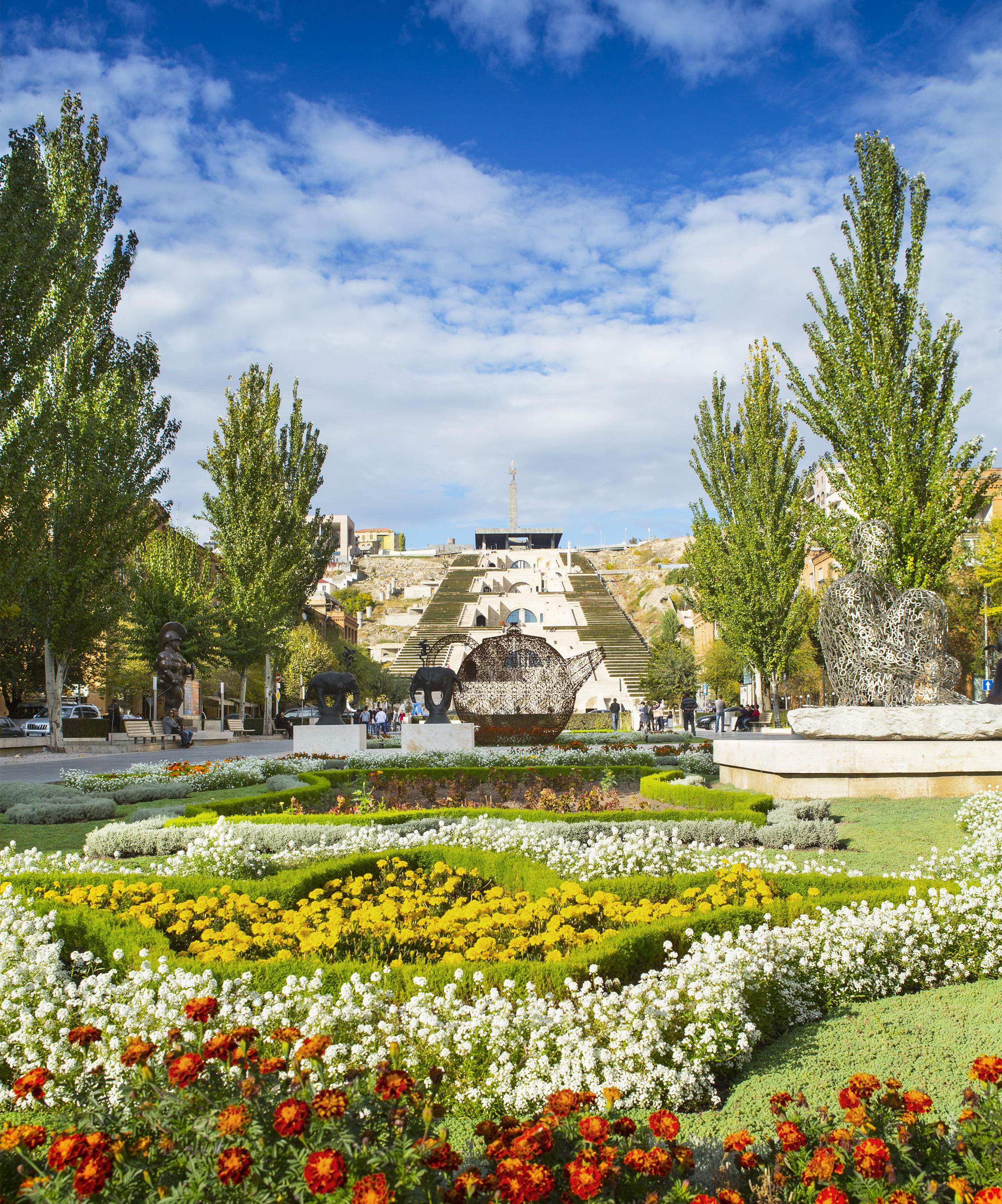
Cascade complex

The construction sector has experienced a significant growth during the 1st decade of the 21st century. Starting from 2000, Yerevan has witnessed a massive construction boom, funded mostly by Armenian millionaires from Russia and the United States, with an extensive and controversial redevelopment process in which many 18th and 19th-century buildings have been demolished and replaced with new buildings. This growth was coupled with a significant increase in real estate prices.

Many major construction projects has been conducted in Yerevan, such as Northern Avenue and the rehabilitation of Old Yerevan on Aram Street. Northern Avenue was completed and opened in 2007, while the Old Yerevan project is still under development. In the past few years, the city centre has also witnessed major road reconstruction, as well as the renovation of the Republic square, funded by the American-Armenian billionaire Kirk Kerkorian. On the other hand, the Argentina-based Armenian businessman Eduardo Eurnekian took over the airport, while the cascade development project was funded by the US based Armenian millionaire Gerard L. Cafesjian.

However, the sector has significantly dropped by the end of the 1st decade of the 21st century, as a result of the global real estate crisis in 2007–09. In 2013, Yerevan dominated over 58% of the annual total construction sector of Armenia.

In February 2017, the urban development committee of the government revealed its plans for the upcoming major construction projects in the city. With a total cost of US$300 million, a new business district will rise at the centre of the city, to replace the current Firdowsi shopping area. The committee has also announced the construction of Noy (Noah) ethnographic residential district at the western vicinity of Kentron District, with an approximate cost of US$100 million.

=== Energy ===
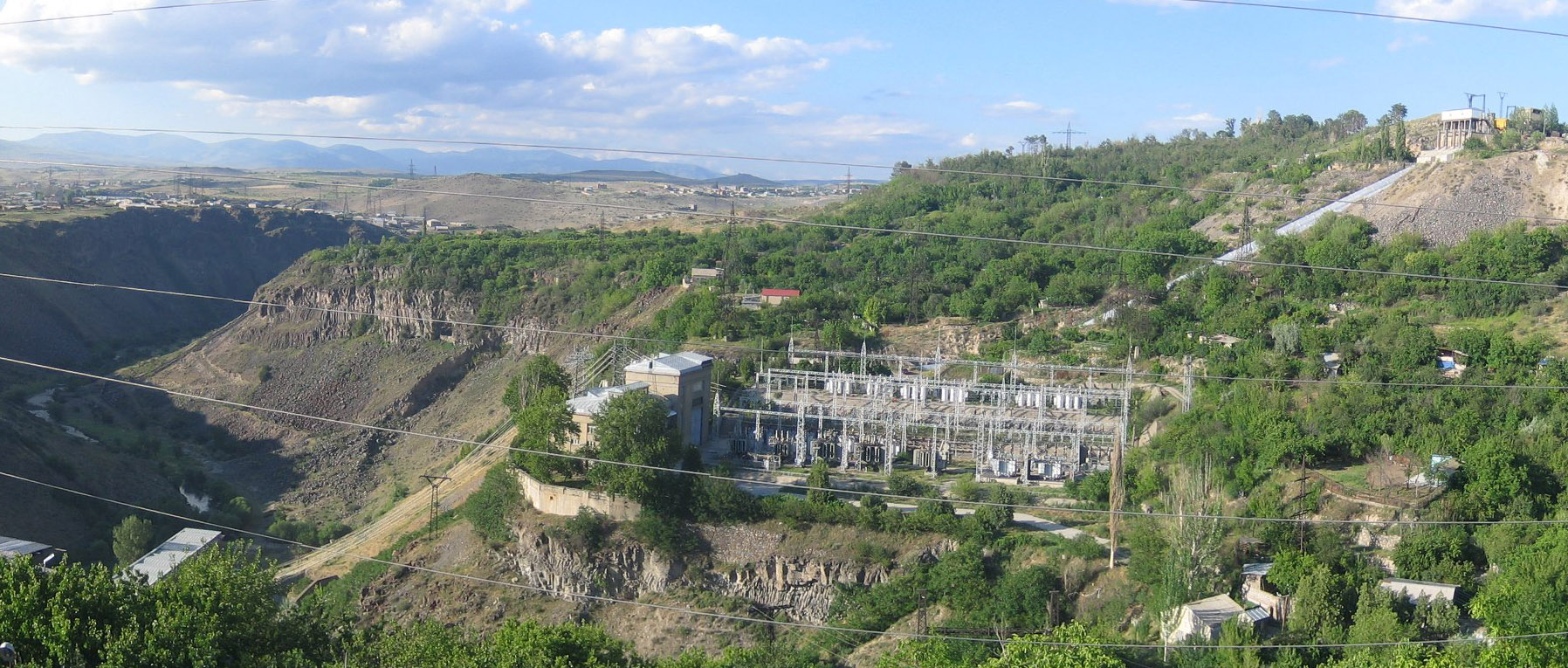
Kanaker HPP of Yerevan

The location of the city on the shores of Hrazdan river has enabled the production of hydroelectricity. As part of the Sevan–Hrazdan Cascade, three hydroelectric power plants are established within the administrative territory of Yerevan: Kanaker HPP, Yerevan-1 HPP, and Yerevan-3 HPP. The entire plant was privatised in 2003, and is currently owned by RusHydro.

The city is also home to the Yerevan Thermal Power Plant, a unique facility in the region for its quality and high technology, situated in the southern part of the city. Originally opened in 1961, a modern plant was built in 2007, furnished with a new gas-steam combined cycled turbine, to generate electric power. In March 2017, the construction of a new thermal power plant was launched with an initial investment of US$258 million and an envisaged capacity of 250 megawatts. The power station will be in service in 2019.

=== Tourism and nightlife ===
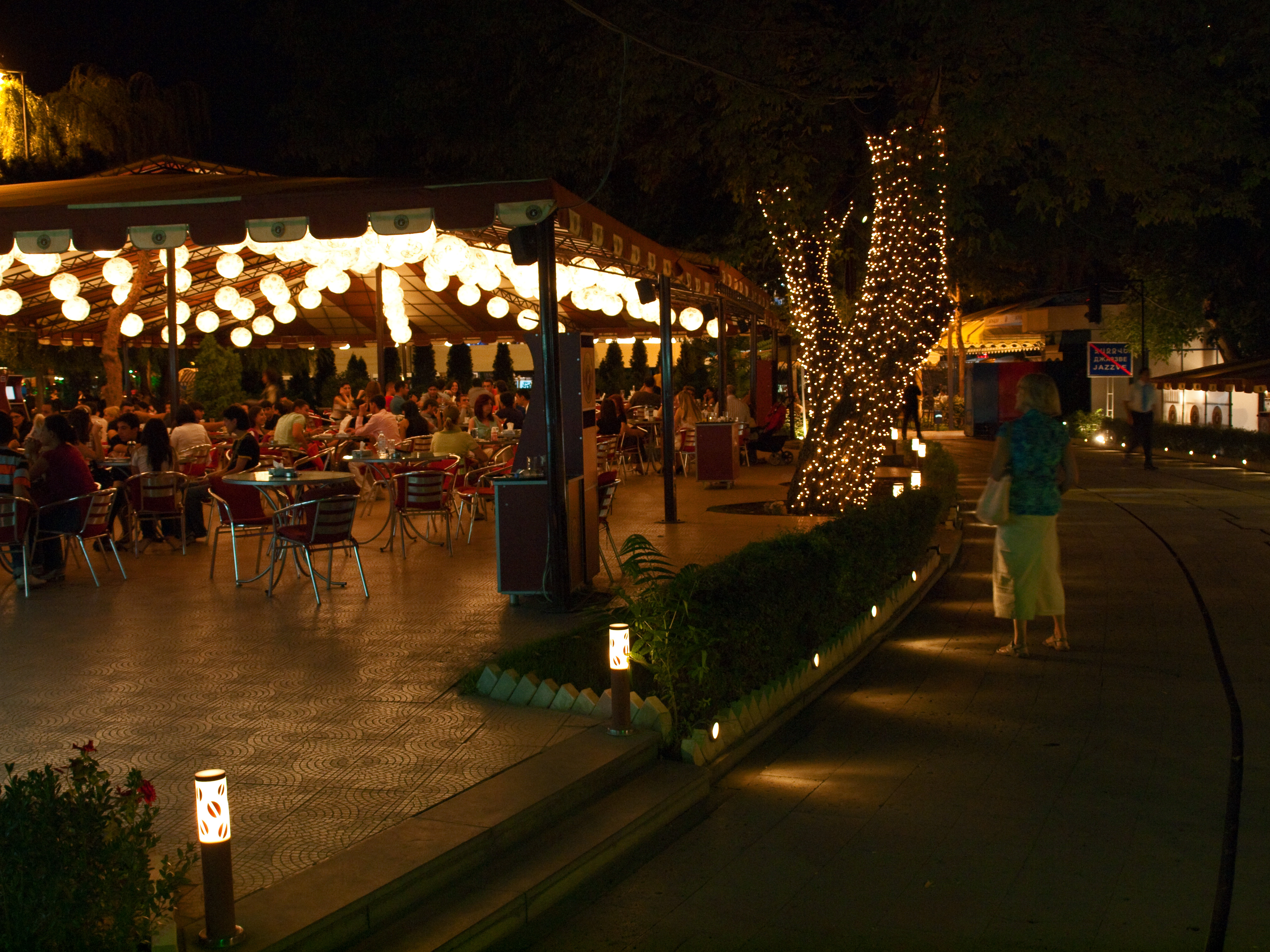
Crowded cafés near the Yerevan Opera House

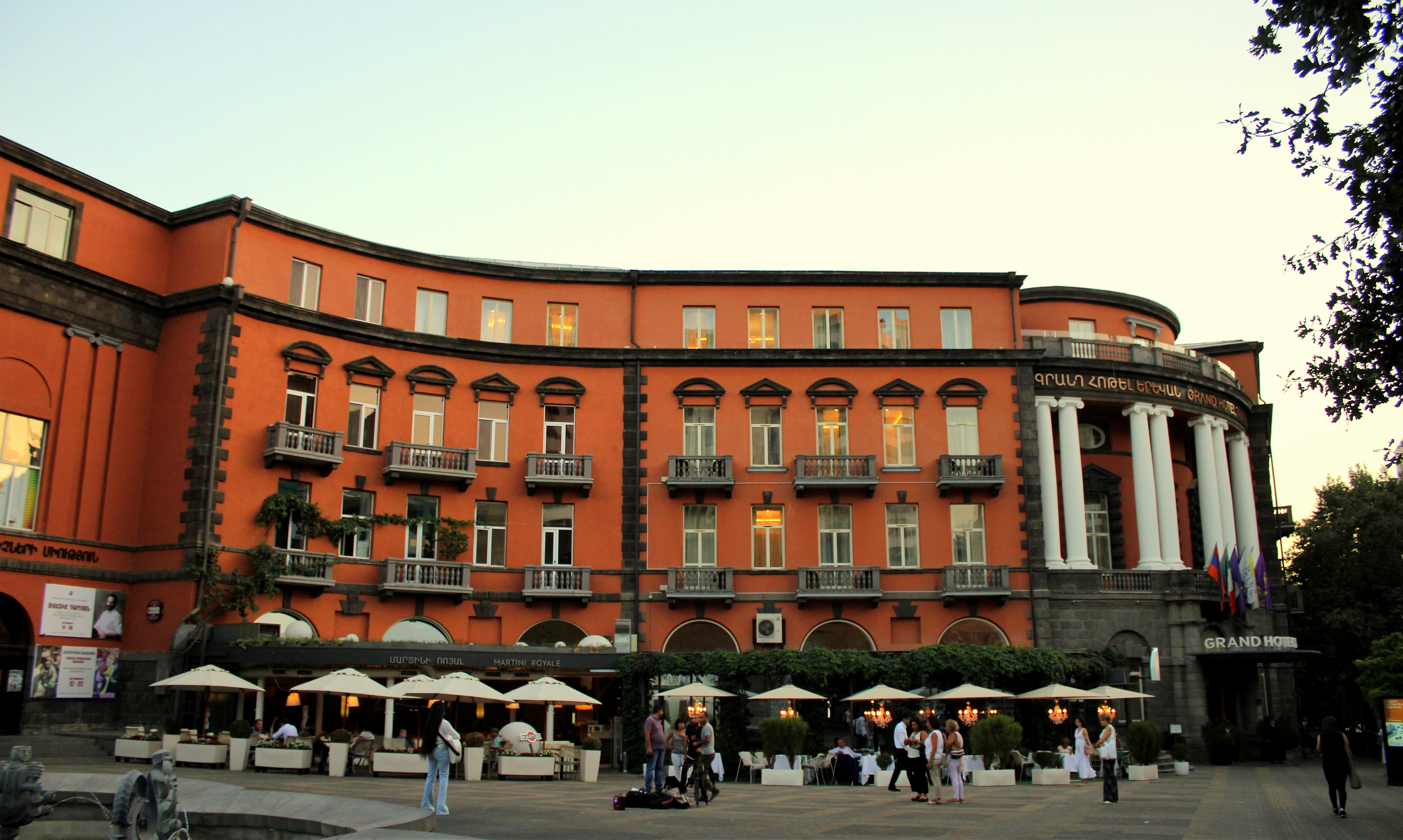
Grand Hotel Yerevan operating since 1926

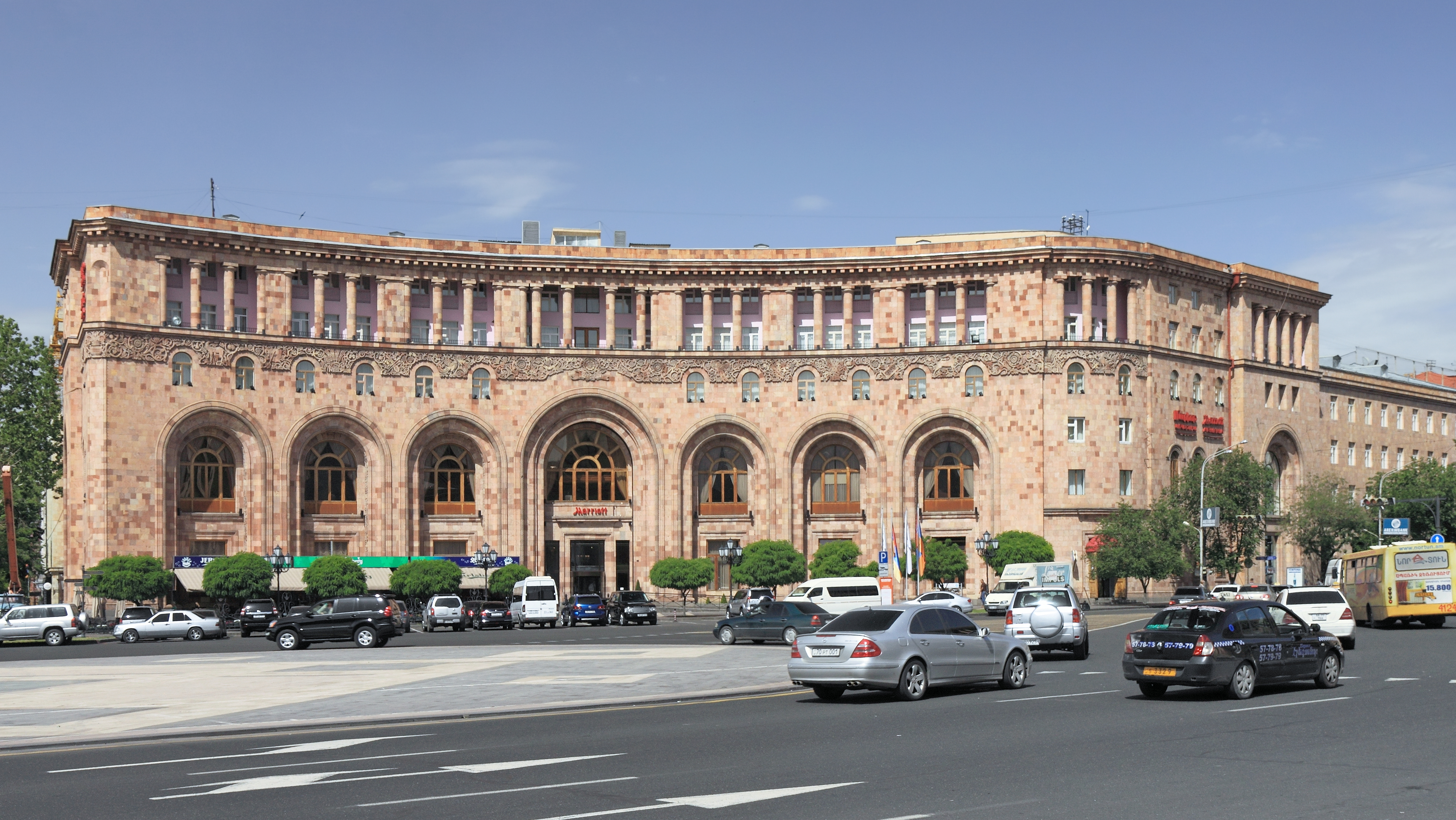
Armenia Marriott Hotel Yerevan at the Republic Square, built in 1958 with traditional Armenian arch series at the façade

Tourism in Armenia is developing year by year and the capital city of Yerevan is one of the major tourist destinations. The city has a majority of luxury hotels, modern restaurants, bars, pubs and nightclubs. Zvartnots airport has also conducted renovation projects with the growing number of tourists visiting the country. Numerous places in Yerevan are attractive for tourists, such as the dancing fountains of the Republic Square, the State Opera House, the Cascade complex, the ruins of the Urartian city of Erebuni (Arin Berd), the historical site of Karmir Blur (Teišebaini), etc. The largest hotel of the city is the Ani Plaza Hotel. The Armenia Marriott Hotel is located at the Republic Square at the centre of Yerevan, while the Radisson Blu Hotel is located near the Victory Park. Other major chains operating in central Yerevan include the Grand Hotel Yerevan of the Small Luxury Hotels of the World, the Best Western Congress Hotel, the DoubleTree by Hilton, the Hyatt Place, the Ibis Yerevan Center, and The Alexander, a Luxury Collection Hotel of Marriott International.

The location of Yerevan itself, is an inspiring factor for the foreigners to visit the city in order to enjoy the view of the biblical mount of Ararat, as the city lies on the feet of the mountain forming the shape of a Roman amphitheatre.

There are many historical sites, churches and citadels in areas and regions surrounding the city of Yerevan, such as Garni Temple, Zvartnots Cathedral, the monasteries of Khor Virap and Geghard, etc.

Being among the top 10 safest cities in the world, Yerevan has an extensive nightlife scene with a variety of nightclubs, live venues, pedestrian zones, street cafés, jazz cafés, tea houses, casinos, pubs, karaoke clubs and restaurants. Casino Shangri La and Pharaon Complex are among the largest leisure and entertainment centres of the city.

Many world-famous music stars, Russian music celebrities, as well as Armenian singers from diaspora, occasionally perform in concerts in Yerevan.

The Yerevan Zoo founded in 1940, the Yerevan Circus opened in 1956, and the Yerevan Water World opened in 2001, are among the popular entertaining centres in the city.

Northern Avenue connects the Opera House with Abovyan street and serves as a popular pedestrian zone in Yerevan with modern residential buildings, business centres, restaurants, bars and cafés. Another popular landmarks is the Yerevan Cascade and the "Cafesjian Sculpture Garden" on Tamanyan Street with its pedestrian zone, featuring many coffee shops, bars, restaurants, and pubs at the sidewalks. The "Cafesjian Center for the Arts" regularly organises art events throughout the year, including classical music series, traditional folk dance events, and live concerts of jazz, pop and rock music.

As of 2017, Yerevan has three shopping malls: Dalma Garden Mall opened in October 2012, followed by Yerevan Mall in February 2014, and Rossia Mall in March 2016.

International study conducted by Mercer and published in 2019 identified Yerevan to offer higher quality of living, than other capital cities of Transcaucasia.

== Education ==
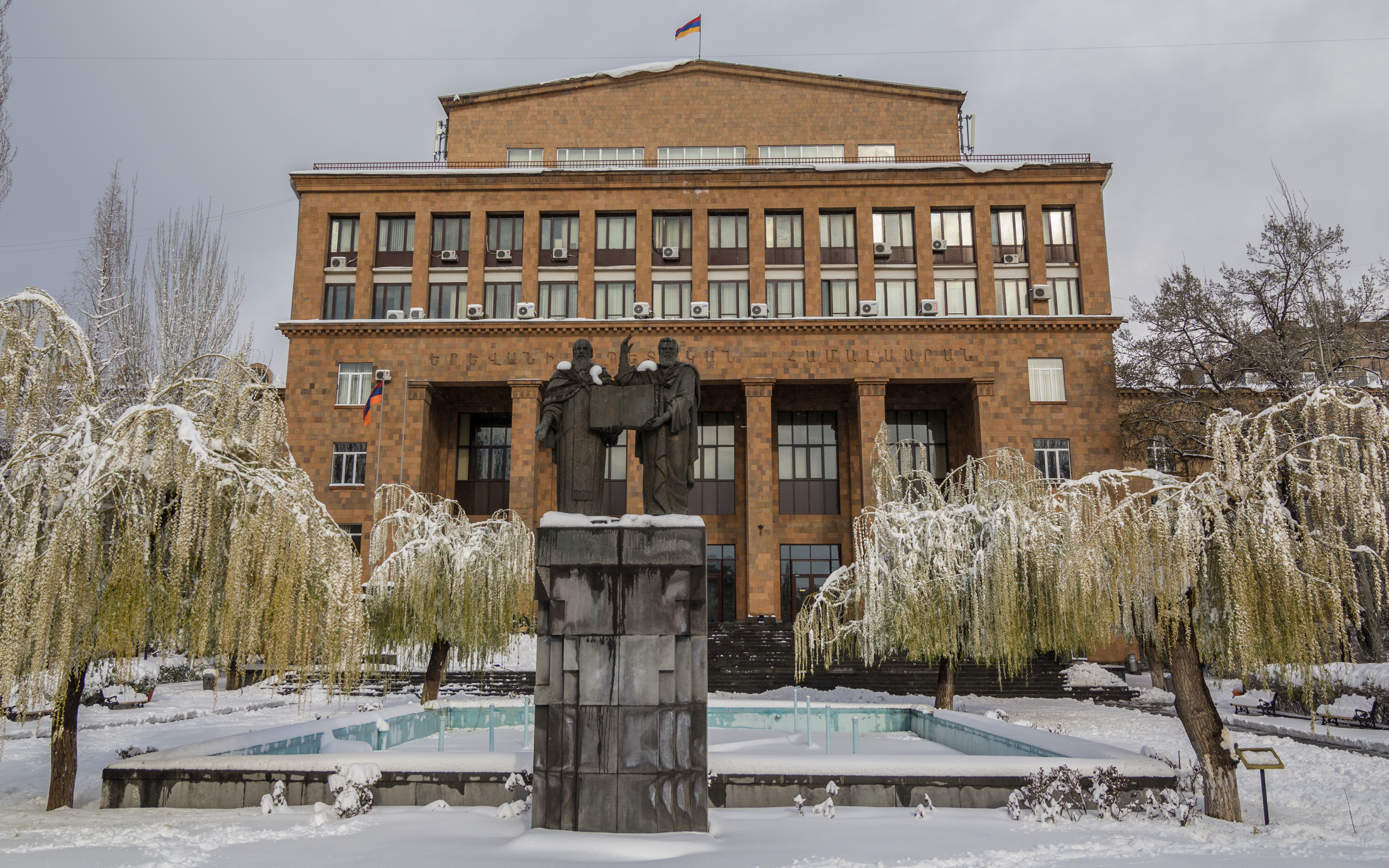
Yerevan State University

Yerevan is a major educational centre in the region. As of 2017, the city is home to more than 250 schools, of which about 210 are state-owned, with 3/4 of them run by the municipality and the rest run by the ministry of education. The rest of the schools (about 40) are privately owned. The municipality also runs 160 kindergartens throughout the city.

The QSI International School, École Française Internationale en Arménie, Ayb School, Mkhitar Sebastatsi Educational Complex and Khoren and Shooshanig Avedisian School are among the prominent international or private schools in Yerevan.

As of 2018, around 60 higher education institutions are accredited and licensed to operate in the Republic of Armenia. Yerevan is home to about 50 universities, nearly half of which are public. Yerevan State University, American University of Armenia, Russian-Armenian (Slavonic) University, Yerevan State Medical University and Armenian State Pedagogical University are the top rated universities of Armenia and among the top rated in the region.

=== Science and research ===
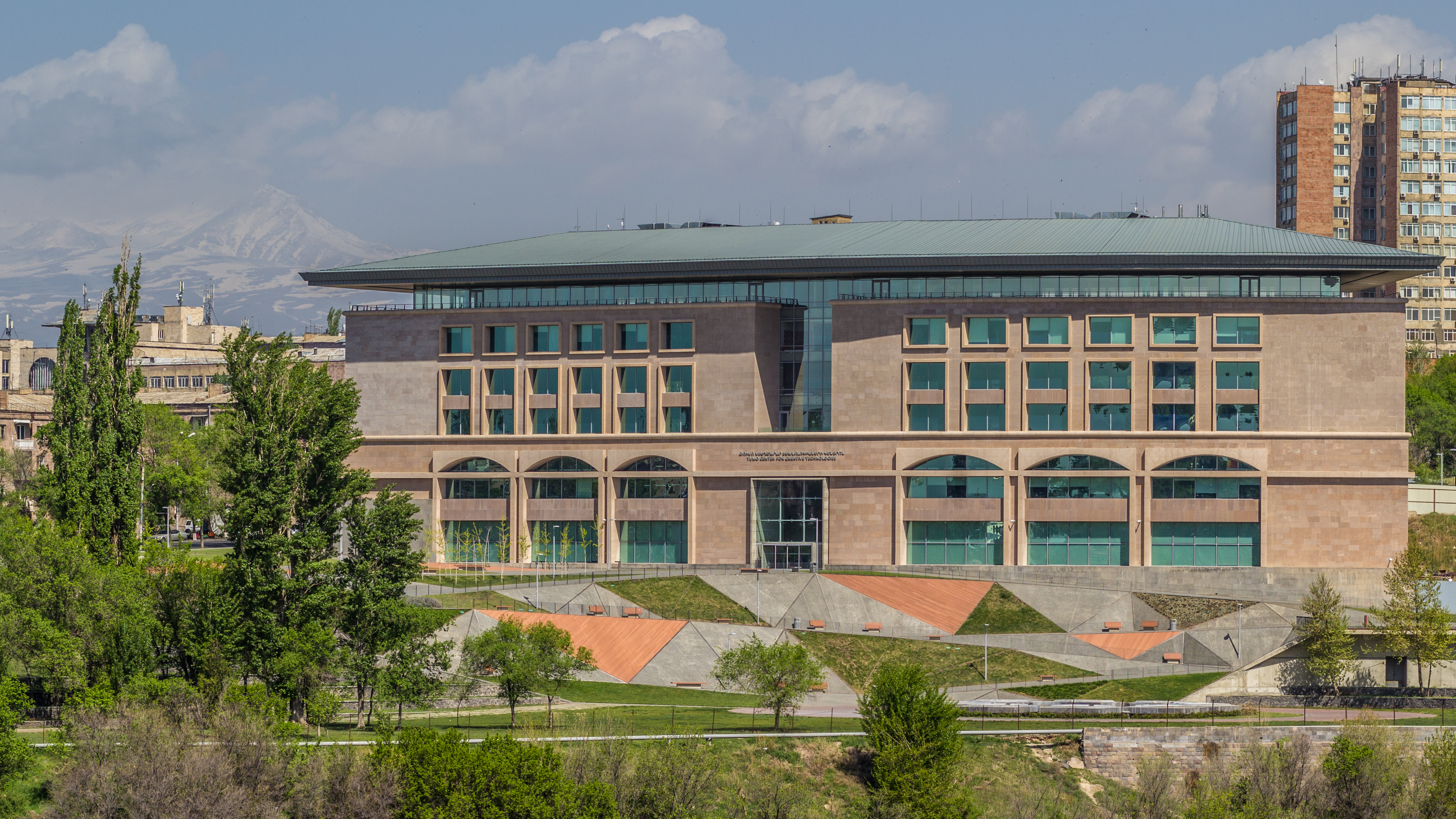
Tumo Center for Creative Technologies

Under the Soviet rule, Yerevan has turned into a major centre for science and research. The Armenian National Academy of Sciences is the pioneer of scientific research in Armenia. It was founded in 1943 as the Armenian Branch of the Soviet Academy of Sciences to become the primary body that conducts research and coordinates activities in the fields of science in Armenia. It has many divisions, including Mathematical and Technical Sciences, Physics and Astrophysics, Natural Sciences, Chemistry and Earth Sciences, Armenology and Social Sciences.

After the independence, many new research centres were opened in the city, such as the CANDLE Synchrotron Research Institute (2010), Tumo Center for Creative Technologies (2011), and Nerses Mets Medical Research and Education Center (2013).

After the Russian invasion of Ukraine in March 2022, over 40,000 Russian professionals and programmers arrived in Yerevan. Half stayed briefly and then moved on while the rest reestablished themselves using internet connections that kept Armenia connected to the world while Russia was increasingly cut off. In addition to IT experts the exodus included many bloggers, journalists and activists who faced arrest for criticising the war in Ukraine. Interviews indicated that none of the exiles encountered hostility in Yerevan. They can enter Armenia without visas or passports and remain six months; Russian is widely spoken.

== Sport ==
=== Football ===
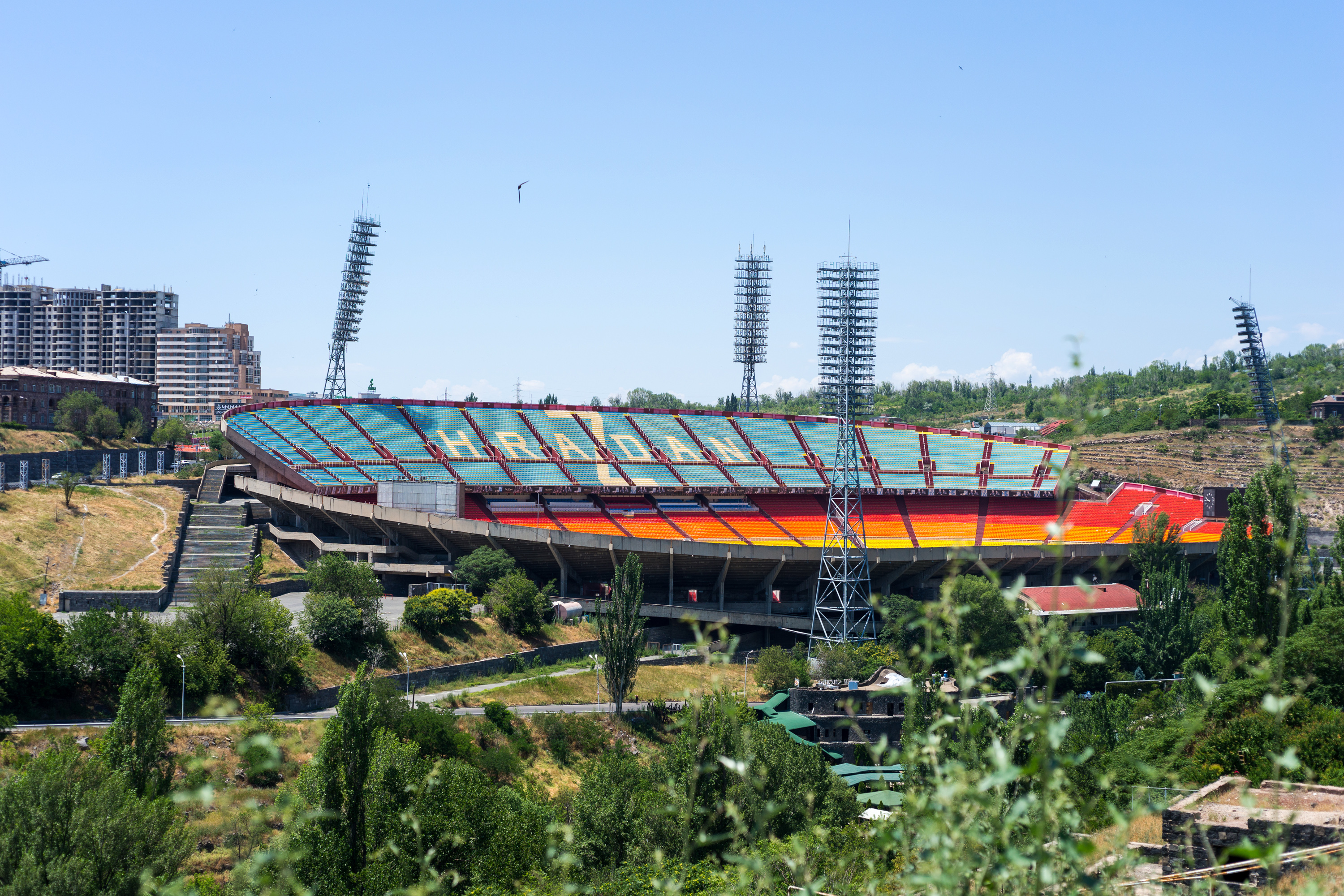
Hrazdan Stadium

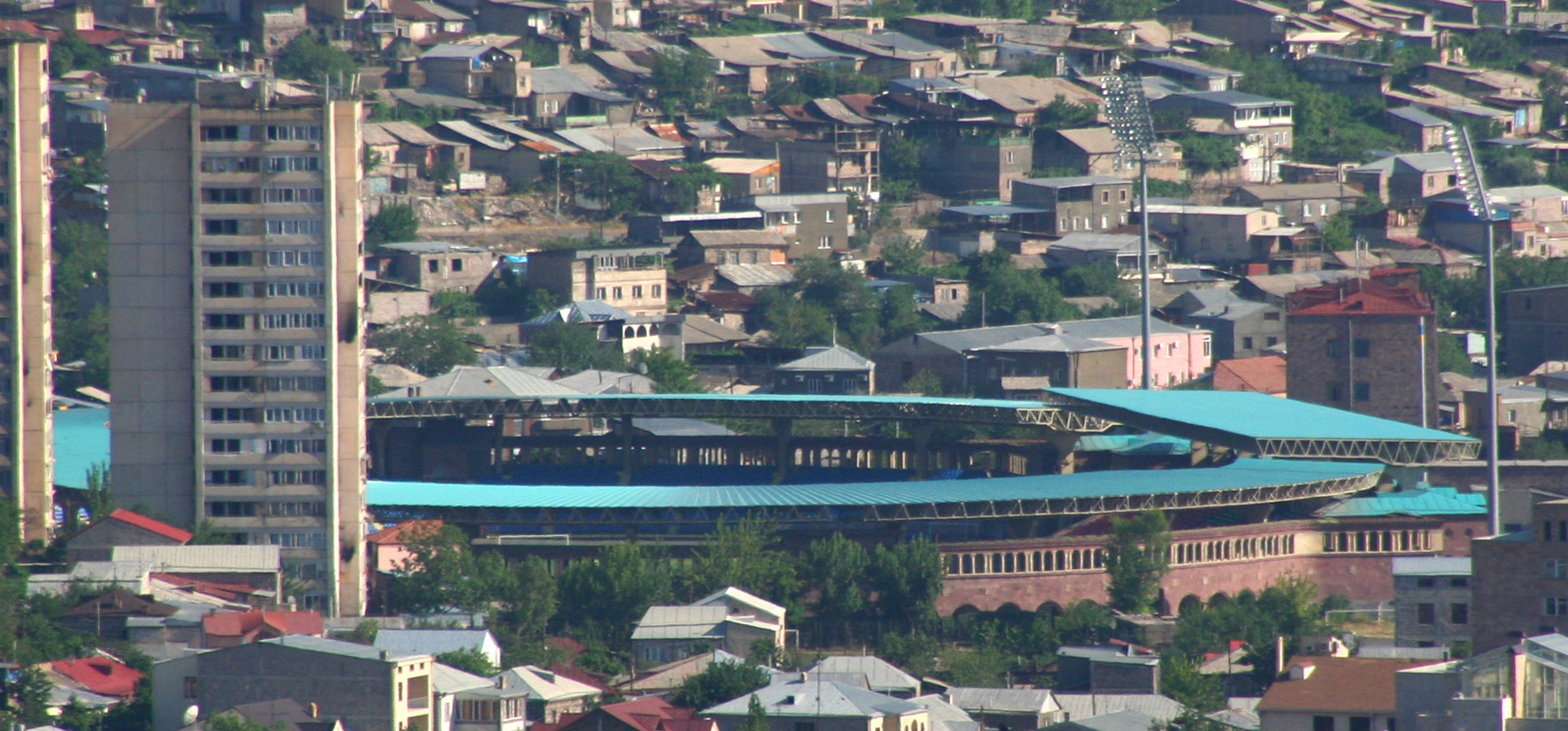
Vazgen Sargsyan Republican Stadium

Football is the most played and popular sport in Yerevan and the entire country. Yerevan city is home to about a dozen of football clubs competing in the Armenian Premier League and the Armenian First League, with the most successful clubs being Pyunik, Alashkert, Ararat Yerevan, Ararat-Armenia, Urartu and Yerevan.

Hrazdan Stadium in Yerevan is the largest sports venue of Armenia. The 2nd-largest stadium in the city is the Vazgen Sargsyan Republican Stadium which currently serves as the primary home ground of the Armenia national football team.

The Football Academy of Yerevan operated by the Football Federation of Armenia is an up-to-date training academy complex, opened in 2010.

As of 2017, there are around 130 mini-football pitches among the courtyards of the Yerevan neighbourhoods, built by the municipal authorities.

=== Chess ===
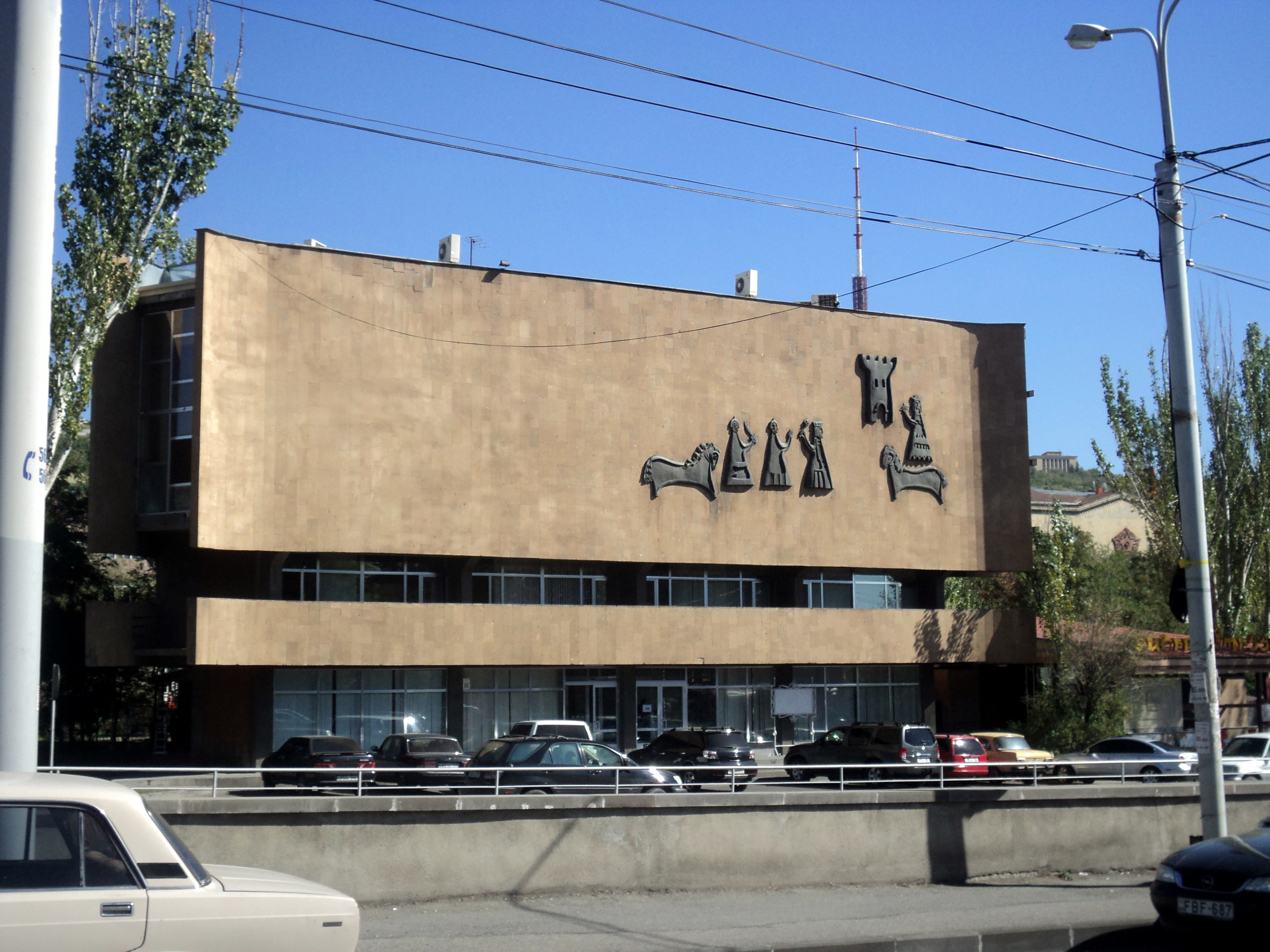
Tigran Petrosian Chess House

Armenia has always excelled in chess with its players being very often among the highest ranked and decorated. The headquarters of the Chess Federation of Armenia is located in the Tigran Petrosian Chess House of Yerevan. Already in primary school, chess education is offered. The city is home to a large number of chess teams and training schools. In 1996, despite the severe economic conditions in the country, Yerevan hosted the 32nd Chess Olympiad. In 2006, the four members from Yerevan of the Armenian chess team won the 37th Chess Olympiad in Turin and repeated the feat at the 38th Chess Olympiad in Dresden. Armenian won the chess Olympiad for the 3rd time in 2012 in Istanbul. The Yerevan-born leader of the chess national team; Levon Aronian, is one of the top chess players in the world.

=== Basketball ===
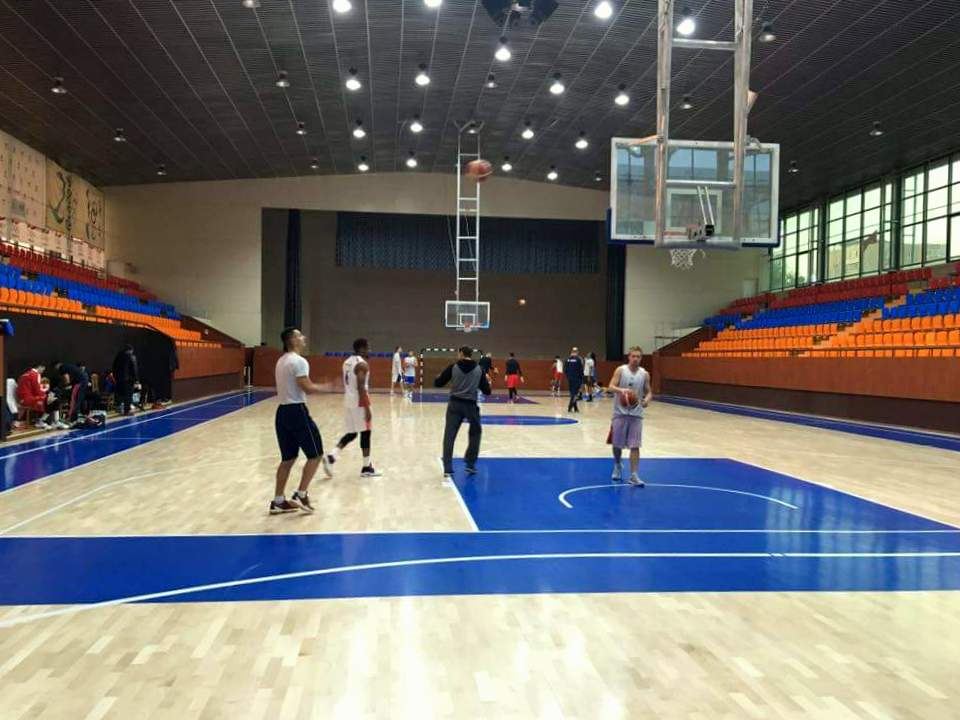
Armenia national basketball team at the Mika Arena

The first ever season of the professional domestic basketball competition of Armenia, known as Armenia Basketball League A, was launched in October 2017 with 7 participating teams. Yerevan is represented by 4 clubs: Engineer Yerevan, FIMA Basketball, BC Grand Sport and BC Urartu.

=== Tennis ===
Tennis is also among the popular sports in Yerevan. Several tennis clubs operate in the city, with many of them founded during the Soviet days. Incourt Tennis Club –founded in 1974– is the largest in the city, with many indoor and outdoor courts. Ararat Tennis Club founded in 1990, is also among the prominent clubs in the city. Tennis clubs are also found within the Yerevan State Sports College of Olympic Reserve since 1971, and the Yerevan Football Academy since 2010.

Sargis Sargsian and Ani Amiraghyan are the most successful tennis players of Armenia and are from Yerevan.

=== Artistic gymnastics ===
Armenia has produced many Olympic champions in artistic gymnastics during the Soviet days, such as Hrant Shahinyan, Albert Azaryan and Eduard Azaryan. The success of the Armenian gymnasts in the Olympic competitions has greatly contributed in the popularity of the sport. Thus, many prominent competitors represent the country in the European and World championships, including Artur Davtyan and Harutyun Merdinyan.

Yerevan has many state-owned schools of artistic gymnastics, including the Albert Azaryan School opened in 1964 and the Hrant Shahinyan School opened in 1965.

=== Other sports ===
Karen Demirchyan Sports and Concerts Complex is the largest indoor arena in the city and the entire country. It is mostly used for indoor sport events, including ice hockey and figure skating shows. On the other hand, Dinamo and Mika indoor arenas are the regular venues for domestic and regional competitions of basketball, volleyball, handball and futsal.

Armenia Sports Union (Spartak Sports Union between 1935 and 1999) is a sports society mainly involved in individual Olympic sports, including boxing, weightlifting, athletics, wrestling, taekwondo, table tennis, etc.

The "Yerevan State Sports College of Olympic Reserve" is a large sports and educational complex located in the Malatia-Sebastia District of the city. It was founded in 1971, and is home to individual as well as team sport schools, such as wrestling, boxing, weightlifting, judo, athletics, acrobatic gymnastics, artistic gymnastics, swimming, table tennis, cycling, basketball, volleyball and handball.

In September 2015, the new Olympic Training Complex of Yerevan, locally known as Olympavan, was opened in Davtashen District. It is a state of the art sports complex, with training facilities for most Olympic individual and team sports, as well as water sports. It is also home to the anti-doping medical centre and a hotel designated to accommodate more than 300 athletes.

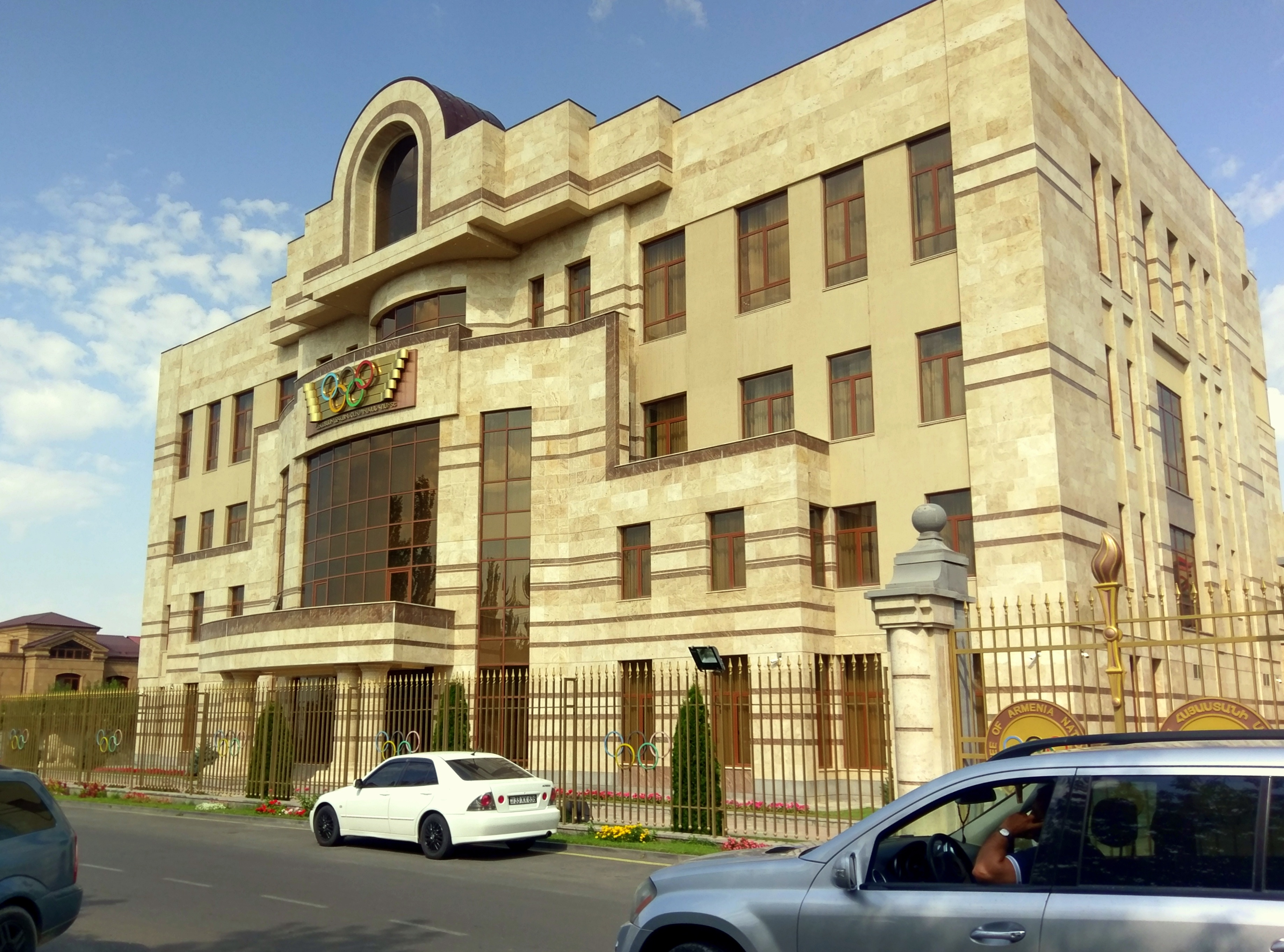
Olympavan, home and training complex of the Armenian Olympic Committee

Equestrian sport was introduced to Armenia in 1953. The Hovik Hayrapetyan Equestrian Centre opened in 2001, occupies an area of 85 hectares at the southern Shengavit District of Yerevan. It is the centre of equestrian sport and horse racing in Armenia.

Golf has been introduced to the citizens of Yerevan in 1999, with the foundation of the Ararat Valley Country Club in the Vahakni neighbourhood of Ajapnyak District. It is the first-ever golf course opened in Armenia as well as the Transcaucasian region.

Arena Bowling and Billiards Club is an up-to-date sports and leisure centre opened in 2004 and located on Mashtots Avenue in central Yerevan.

Cycling as a sport is becoming popular among the young generation. The Yerevan Velodrome is an outdoor track cycling venue with international standard, opened in 2011 to replace the old venue of the Soviet days. Edgar Stepanyan of Armenia became champion of the scratch race in the 2015 junior UEC European Track Championships.

In an attempt to promote figure skating and ice hockey in Armenia, the Irina Rodnina Figure Skating Centre was opened in Yerevan, in December 2015.

Futsal is also among the popular sports in Armenia. Many companies as well as universities have their own teams who participate in the Armenian Futsal Premier League. Currently, Futsal Club Leo based in Yerevan, is considered as the most successful team in the Armenian Futsal Premier League.

Recently, MMA has gained massive popularity in Armenia, being promoted by Armfighting Professional Federation based in Yerevan. It was founded in 2005 by Hayk Ghukasyan and currently runs several branches throughout the provinces of Armenia and Artsakh with more than 2,000 athletes.

With the increased interest in healthy lifestyle and fitness, many large and modern training complexes with indoor and outdoor swimming pools have recently been opened in the city such as the Davit Hambardzumyan Swimming and Diving Olympic School, Orange Fitness Premium Club, DDD Sports Complex, Aqua Land Sports Complex, Gold's Gym, Grand Sport Complex, Reebok Sports Club, and Multi Wellness Sport and Health Center.

== International relations ==
The city of Yerevan is member of many international organisations: the International Assembly of CIS Countries' Capitals and Big Cities (MAG), the Black Sea Capitals' Association (BSCA), the International Association of Francophone Mayors (AIMF), the Organization of World Heritage Cities (OWHC), the International Association of Large-scale Communities, and the International Urban Community Lighting Association (LUCI).

=== Twin towns – sister cities ===
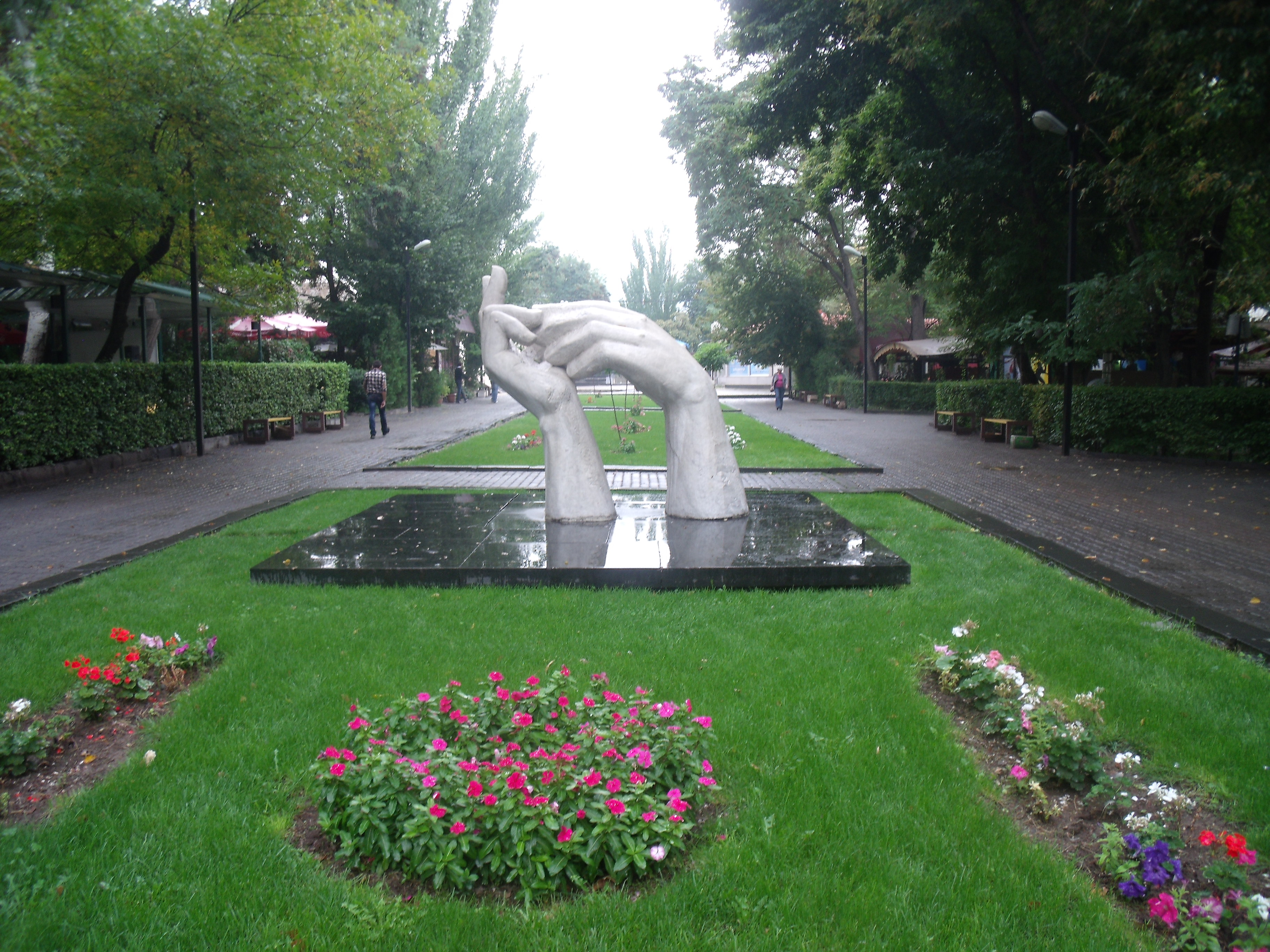
The hands of friendship from Carrara to Yerevan

Yerevan is twinned with:

- Amman, Jordan (2014)
- Antananarivo, Madagascar (1981)
- Beirut, Lebanon (1997)
- Bratislava, Slovakia (2001)
- Buenos Aires, Argentina (2000)
- Cambridge, United States (1987)
- Carrara, Italy (1973)
- Chișinău, Moldova (2005)
- Damascus, Syria (1997)
- Doha, Qatar (2022)
- Isfahan, Iran (1995)
- Los Angeles, United States (2007)
- Marseille, France (1992)
- Montreal, Canada (1998)
- Nice, France (2007)
- Novosibirsk, Russia (2014)
- Odesa, Ukraine (1995)
- Qingdao, China (2023)
- Riga, Latvia (2013)
- Rostov-on-Don, Russia (2005)
- São Paulo, Brazil (2002)
- Stavropol, Russia (1994)
- (Georgia (country)) Tbilisi, Georgia (1996)
- Tehran, Iran (2023)
- Venice, Italy (2011)
- Volgograd, Russia (2015)

=== Partnerships ===
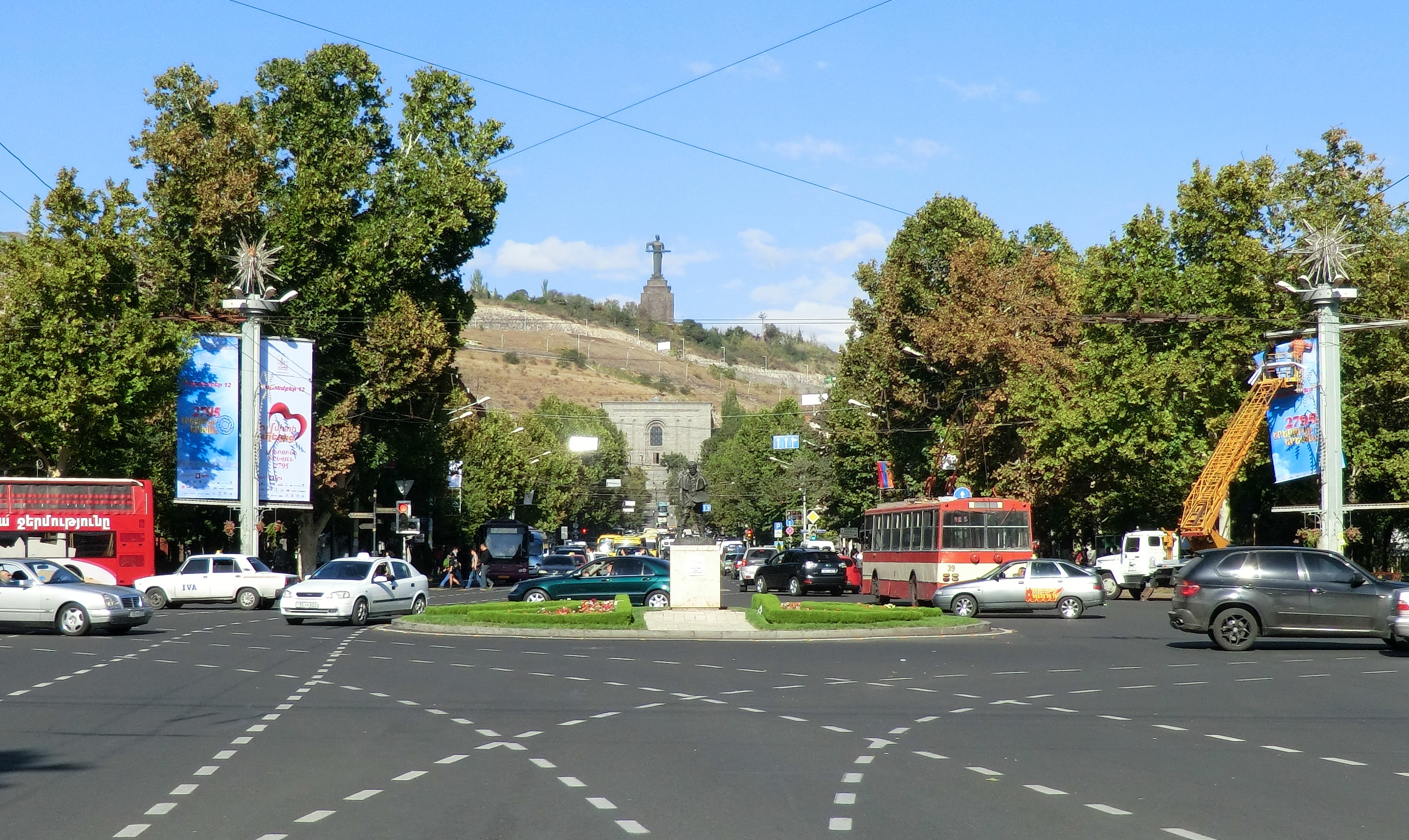
Place de France with the statue of Jules Bastien-Lepage by Auguste Rodin at the centre are among the symbols featuring the partnership between Yerevan and Paris

Yerevan also cooperates with:

- Ashgabat, Turkmenistan (2014)
- Athens, Greece (1993)
- Beijing, China (2009)
- Bucharest, Romania (2013)
- Delhi, India (2008)
- Île-de-France, France (2011)
- Khanty-Mansiysk, Russia (2014)
- Lyon, France (1993)
- Kaliningrad, Russia (2009)
- Kyiv, Ukraine (1995)
- Krasnodar, Russia (2014)
- Minsk, Belarus (2002)
- Moscow, Russia (1995)
- Paris, France (2011)
- Pesaro, Italy (2017)
- Podgorica, Montenegro (1974)
- Qazvin, Iran (2014)
- Rio de Janeiro, Brazil (2007)
- Saint Petersburg, Russia (1997)
- Sofia, Bulgaria (2008)
- (Republic of Artsakh) Stepanakert, Artsakh (2012–2023)
- Tuscany, Italy (1996)
- Warsaw, Poland (2013)
- Rome, Italy (2024)

== Notable people ==
- Terter Yerevantsi (1290–1350), first person from Yerevan with fully known biography; scribe and poet; author of first known poems about Yerevan
- Voskan Yerevantsi (17th century), printer
- Simeon I of Yerevan (1710–1780), Catholicos of All Armenians
- Fazil Iravani (1782–1885), Shaykh al-Islām
- Khachatur Abovian (1809–1848), writer
- Irakli Gruzinsky (1826–1882), Prince of Georgia
- Jabbar Baghtcheban (1886–1966), Iranian educator
- Hamo Beknazarian (1891–1965), film director
- Silva Kaputikyan (1919–2006), poet
- Arno Babajanian (1921–1983), Soviet composer
- Grigor Khanjyan (1926–2000), artist and painter
- Karen Demirchyan (1932–1999), Soviet and Armenian politician
- Armen Dzhigarkhanyan (born 1935–2020), Soviet and Armenian-Russian actor
- Mikhail Piotrovsky (born 1944), Russian historian
- Ihor Tselovalnykov (1944–1986), Ukrainian cyclist
- Carlos Sayadyan (born 1948), painter
- Arthur Meschian (born 1949), composer and architect
- Têmûrê Xelîl (born 1949), Yazidi journalist
- Maria Abajan (born 1950), soprano
- Ruben Hakhverdyan (born 1950), singer/songwriter
- Khoren Oganesian (born 1955), football player
- William Weiner (born 1955), composer
- Vardan Petrosyan (born 1959), actor
- Hasmik Papian (born 1961), soprano
- Tata Simonyan (born 1962), pop singer
- Ruben Vardanyan (born 1968), entrepreneur and philanthropist
- Garik Martirosyan (born 1974), Russia-based comedian
- Arthur Abraham (born 1980), boxer, world champion
- Armenchik (born 1980), pop-folk singer
- Levon Aronian (born 1982), chess player
- Anna Chicherova (born 1982), Russian high jumper
- Sergey Khachatryan (born 1985), violinist
- Sirusho (born 1987), contemporary singer
- Henrikh Mkhitaryan (born 1989), football player
- Iveta Mukuchyan (born 1986), contemporary singer
- Armen Adamjan (born 1989 or 1990), TikToker
- Aida Nersissyan, television presenter
- Naré Kerobyan, winner of the Junior Eurovision Song Contest 2026.

== Bibliography ==
- Bournoutian, George (2018). Armenia and Imperial Decline: The Yerevan Province, 1900-1914. Routledge.
- Bournoutian, George A. (2006). A Concise History of the Armenian People (5th ed.). Costa Mesa, CA: Mazda. ISBN 1568591411.
- Bournoutian, George A. (1980). "The Population of Persian Armenia Prior to and Immediately Following its Annexation to the Russian Empire: 1826-1832" (PDF). The Wilson Center, Kennan Institute for Advanced Russian Studies. Archived (PDF) from the original on 15 February 2021.
- Grigoryan, Mark V. (2022). Ереван. Биография города [Yerevan: Biography of a City] (in Russian). Moscow: Slovo. ISBN 978-5-387-01752-0.
- Grigorian, Mark V. (1969). Площадь Ленина в Ереване. Воспоминания о проектировании и строительстве [Lenin Square in Yerevan: Recollections of Design and Construction] (in Russian). Yerevan: Hayastan.
- Hambardzumyan, Viktor, ed. (1977). "Երեվան". Soviet Armenian Encyclopedia (in Armenian). Vol. 3. Yerevan: Armenian Academy of Sciences. Archived from the original on 12 August 2025.
- Hakopian, T. Kh. "The History of Yerevan." Old Yerevan (2003): 10–39.
- Kettenhofen, Erich; Bournoutian, George A.; Hewsen, Robert H. (1998). "EREVAN". Encyclopaedia Iranica, Vol. VIII, Fasc. 5. pp. 542–551.
- Lindsay, Ian, and Adam T. Smith. "A History of Archaeology in the Republic of Armenia." Journal of field archaeology 31.2 (2006): 165–184. online
- Panossian, Razmik (2006). The Armenians: From Kings And Priests to Merchants And Commissars. New York: Columbia University Press. ISBN 978-0-231-13926-7.
- Saparov, Arsène (2015). From Conflict to Autonomy in the Caucasus: The Soviet Union and the Making of Abkhazia, South Ossetia and Nagorno Karabakh. London: Routledge. ISBN 978-1-317-63783-7.
- Shakarian, Pietro A. (2025). Anastas Mikoyan: An Armenian Reformer in Khrushchev's Kremlin. Bloomington: Indiana University Press. ISBN 978-0253073556.
- Ter Minassian, Taline (2007). Erevan: La construction d'une capitale à l'époque soviétique (in French). Rennes: Presses universitaires de Rennes. ISBN 978-2753503694.
- Vardanyan, Sergey. "The capitals of Armenia", Apolo 1995. ISBN 5-8079-0778-7
- G. Zakoyan, M. Sivaslian, V. Navasardian. "My Yerevan," Acnalis 2001. ISBN 99930-902-0-4
- Zoryan, Levon (1978). "Թամանյան, Ալեքսանդր Հովհաննեսի". In Hambardzumyan, Viktor (ed.). Soviet Armenian Encyclopedia (in Armenian). Vol. 4. Yerevan: Armenian Academy of Sciences. Archived from the original on 10 October 2025.
- Yerevan at GEOnet Names Server
- Evliya Çelebi (1834). "Description of the Town of Erivan". Narrative of Travels in Europe, Asia, and Africa, in the Seventeenth Century. Vol. 2. Translated by Joseph von Hammer-Purgstall. London: Oriental Translation Fund.
