= Gerard Cafesjian =

American philanthropist (1925–2013)

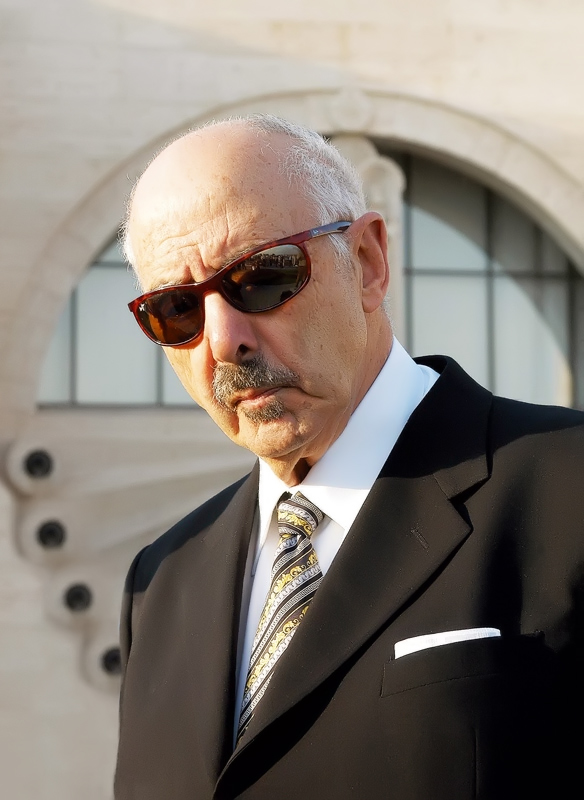
- Cafesjian in Yerevan in November 2009
- Born: April 26, 1925; Brooklyn, New York, United States
- Died: September 15, 2013 (aged 88)
- Occupation: Founder of the Cafesjian Family Foundation

Gerard Leon Cafesjian (Armenian: Ջերարդ Լեւոն Գաֆէսճեան, 26 April 1925 – 15 September 2013) was a businessman and philanthropist who founded the Cafesjian Family Foundation (CFF), the Cafesjian Museum Foundation (CMF) and the Cafesjian Center for the Arts.

== Early years, military service and professional career ==
Cafesjian was born on April 26, 1925, in the Bensonhurst neighborhood of Brooklyn, New York. His parents had immigrated to the United States preceding the Armenian genocide by the Turks.

After amphibious training, he served as a sailor in World War II aboard J. P. Morgan's yacht, the Corsair III, built in 1895 and renamed the USS Oceanographer.The ship did extensive survey work in and around Guadalcanal and other Solomon Islands in 1943 and 1944. He also served aboard the USS Andres (DE45), a destroyer escort for convoys from the United States to North Africa in late 1944 and 1945. When he returned after the war he married Cleo Thomas, a nurse he met during the war. Cafesjian earned a degree in economics from Cornell University and a doctorate of jurisprudence from Columbia Law School, both in five and a half years. He was a member of the New York Bar Association.

He began his career with West Publishing as a legal editor in New York City. He was the first employee in the history of the 100-year-old company to be transferred into the home offices in St. Paul, Minnesota. At West Publishing he rose through the ranks to the position of executive vice president, overseeing sales, marketing, customer service, public relations, and all Westlaw office training and development. At West, he conceived of and started the West Legal Directory and a well-known program, "Art and the Law", which earned him and West numerous awards.

== Philanthropic projects ==
Cafesjian retired from West Publishing when it was sold to Thompson Publishing in 1996. As he said publicly, he felt his destiny was to help the country of Armenia, which had gained its independence after hundreds of years of subjugation under various rulers. The time and circumstances and confluence of resources would help him make a difference for the country. After attending to his family needs, he established the Cafesjian Family Foundation. Through the foundation, he devoted more than $128 million to various Armenian projects. His investments included the private Armenia TV and ArmNews television stations, the Cascade financial services group, real estate and a renewable energy company, all eventually sold. Any profits generated were re-invested in Armenia for further development.

In the United States, Cafesjian helped restore a dismantled historic carousel for Como Park in St. Paul, Minnesota, and founded the Scottsdale Museum of Contemporary Art in Arizona. He also donated to the Armenia Fund USA, the Armenian Assembly of America, the Armenian General Benevolent Union, the Armenian National Committee of America, and others. He was also the owner of The Armenian Reporter, the oldest independent Armenian American publication.

Cafesjian received accolades and recognition from both the U.S. and Armenia institutions, including the Ellis Island Medal of Honor in 2000 and COAF Save a Generation Award in 2010.

=== Cafesjian Center for the Arts in Yerevan ===
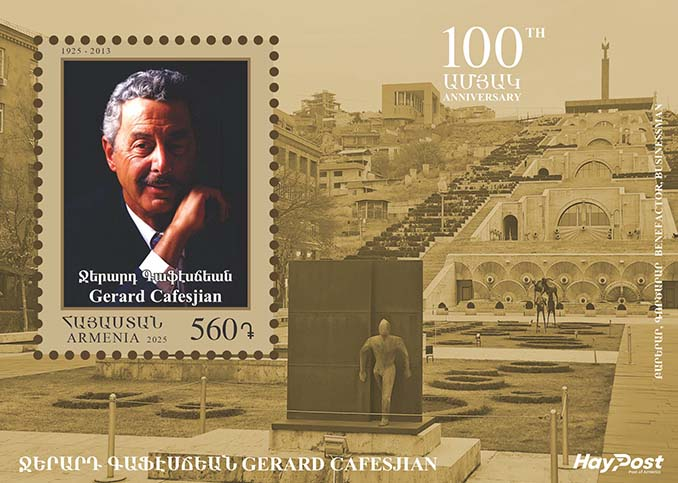
2025 Armenian sheet of stamp showing a photograph of Cafesjian, a section of the Cascade complex, and some of the sculptures in the Cafesjian Sculpture Garden.

Cafesjian completely renovated the Cascade site in downtown Yerevan, Armenia. As of the early 2000s, it was an unfinished and crumbling Soviet structure of epic proportions on a hillside. Following a major reconstruction, the Cascade became the site of the Cafesjian Center for the Arts that opened in 2009. The museum has a sculpture garden with works by Fernando Botero, Lynn Chadwick, Barry Flanagan, François-Xavier Lalanne and Jaume Plensa, among others. Over one million people have visited the Center since its opening.

=== Armenian Genocide Museum and Memorial in Washington ===
From 2000 to 2003, Cafesjian assembled a group of properties in Washington, D.C., two blocks from the White House, with the intention to build an Armenian Genocide Museum and Memorial. But due to continuing litigation, the project remains unrealized. Although Cafesjian won the basic lawsuit in January 2011 and was awarded the property, and subsequent motions for new trial were dismissed, the project is still in limbo awaiting the Court to rule on yet another appeal.

== Personal life ==
Gerard Cafesjian married Cleo Thomas, a nurse he met during World War II, on July 4, 1947, and together they had three children. Gerard's eldest son, Tommy Cafesjian, was a real estate magnate based out of Philadelphia.

Gerard Cafesjian died on September 15, 2013, at the age of 88. His wife Cleo Cafesjian had died just a few months earlier, on March 7, 2013.

== See also ==
- Cafesjian Museum of Art
