= Tamanyan Street =

Street in Yerevan, Armenia

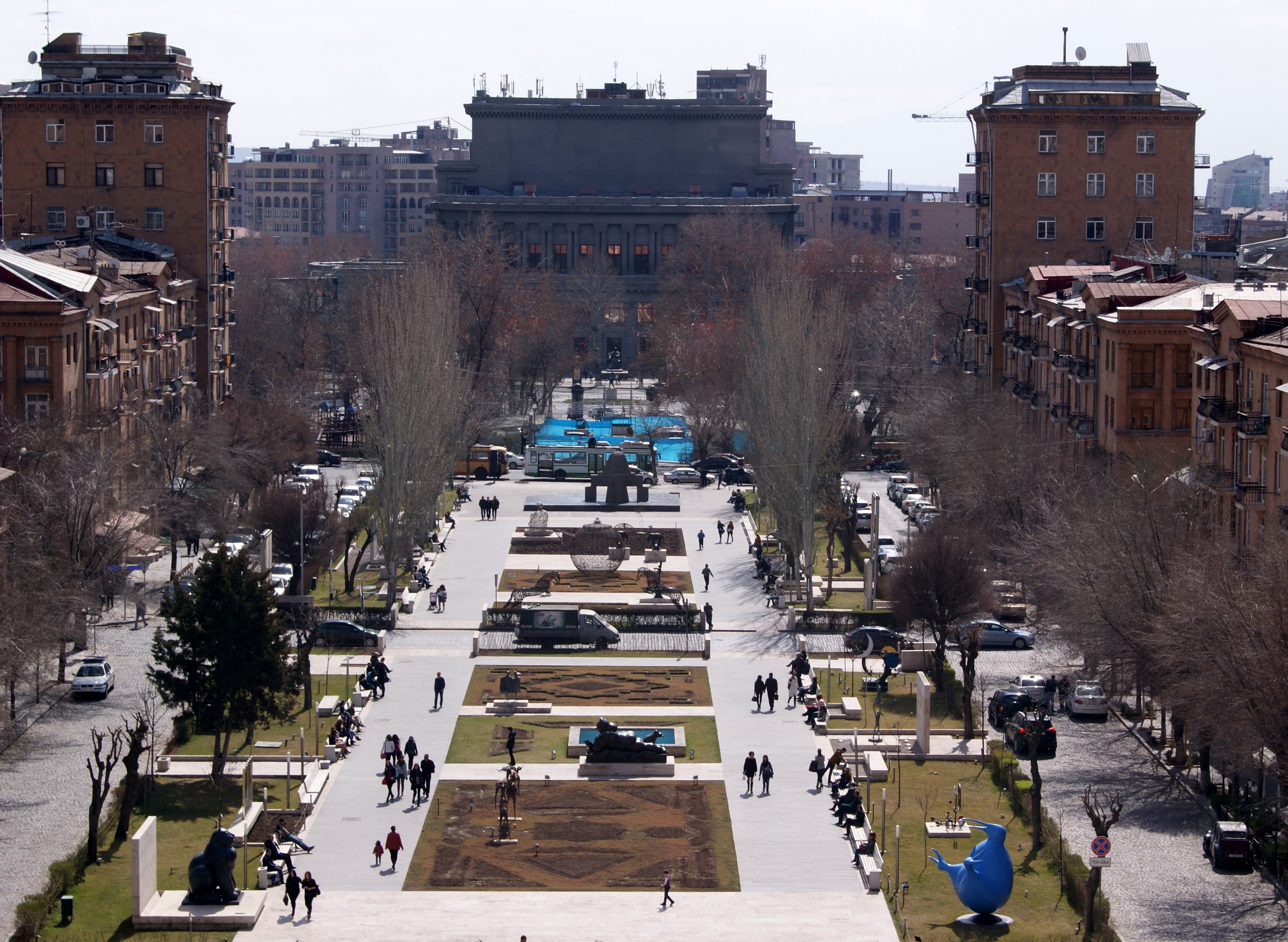
- Native name: Թամանյան Փողոց (Armenian)
- Length: 200 m (660 ft)
- Width: 55
- Location: Kentron district, Yerevan Armenia

Tamanyan Street (Armenian: Թամանյան Փողոց, Tamanyan poghots) is a pedestrian street in Yerevan, Armenia. It is located in the central Kentron district and links the Yerevan Cascade at the north with the Moscow street at the south. It has a length of 200 metres (660 ft) and a width of 55 metres (180 ft). It is named after the main architect of Yerevan Alexander Tamanian. Tamanian's statue stands at the entrance to the street since 1974.

The Cafesjian Sculpture Garden of the Cafesjian Museum of Art is located along the street. The street ends with the staircase of the cascade complex.

The sculpture garden of the street is home to works of many influential artists including Fernando Botero's Cat, Roman warrior, and Woman Smoking a Cigarette.

The Museum of Russian Art is also located on the Tamanyan Street.

Several types of coffee shops, bars, restaurants, and pubs are found at the sidewalks of the street.

== Gallery ==
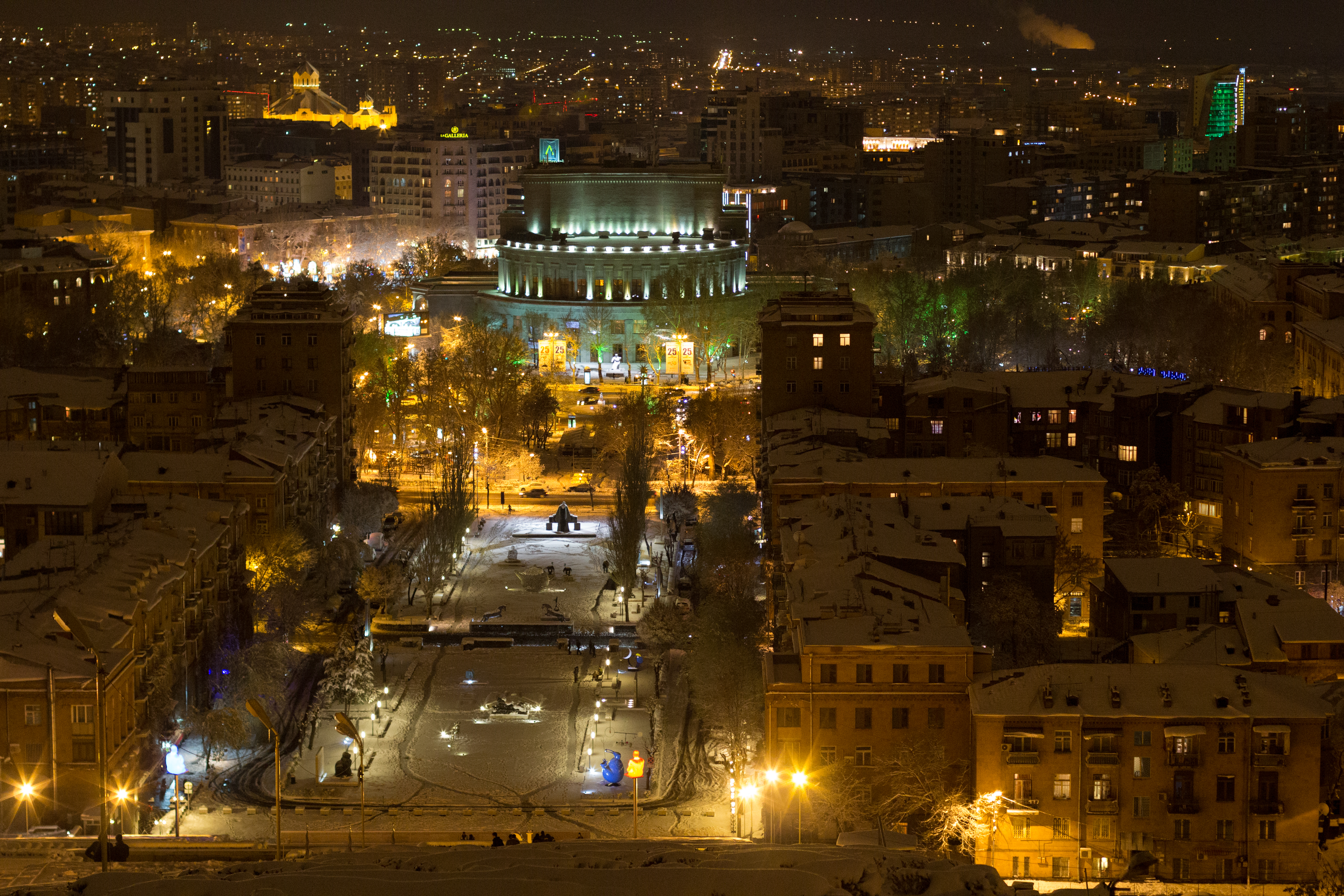
The Tamanyan Street at night

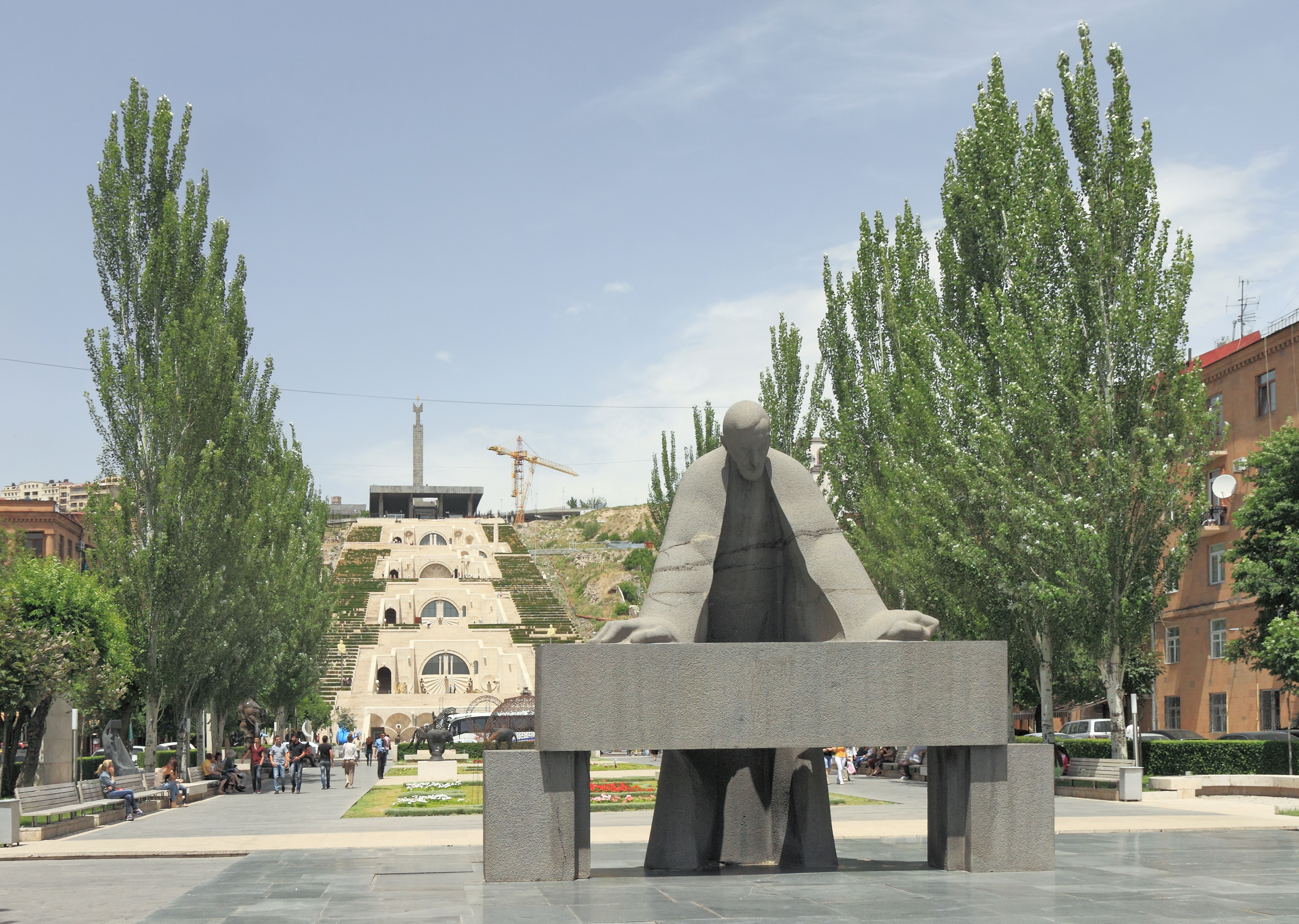
Tamanian's statue at the entrance

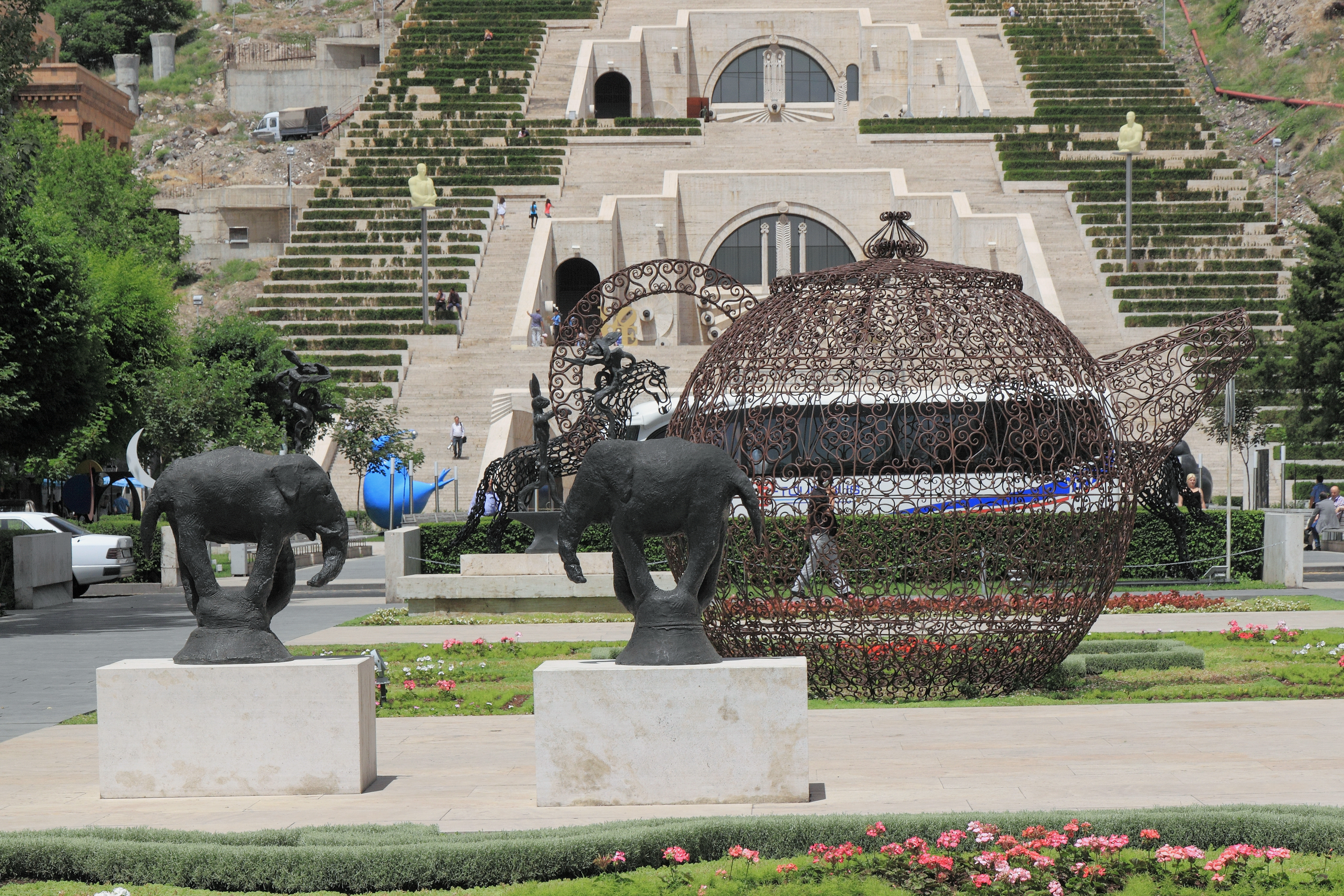
Artworks at the sculpture garden

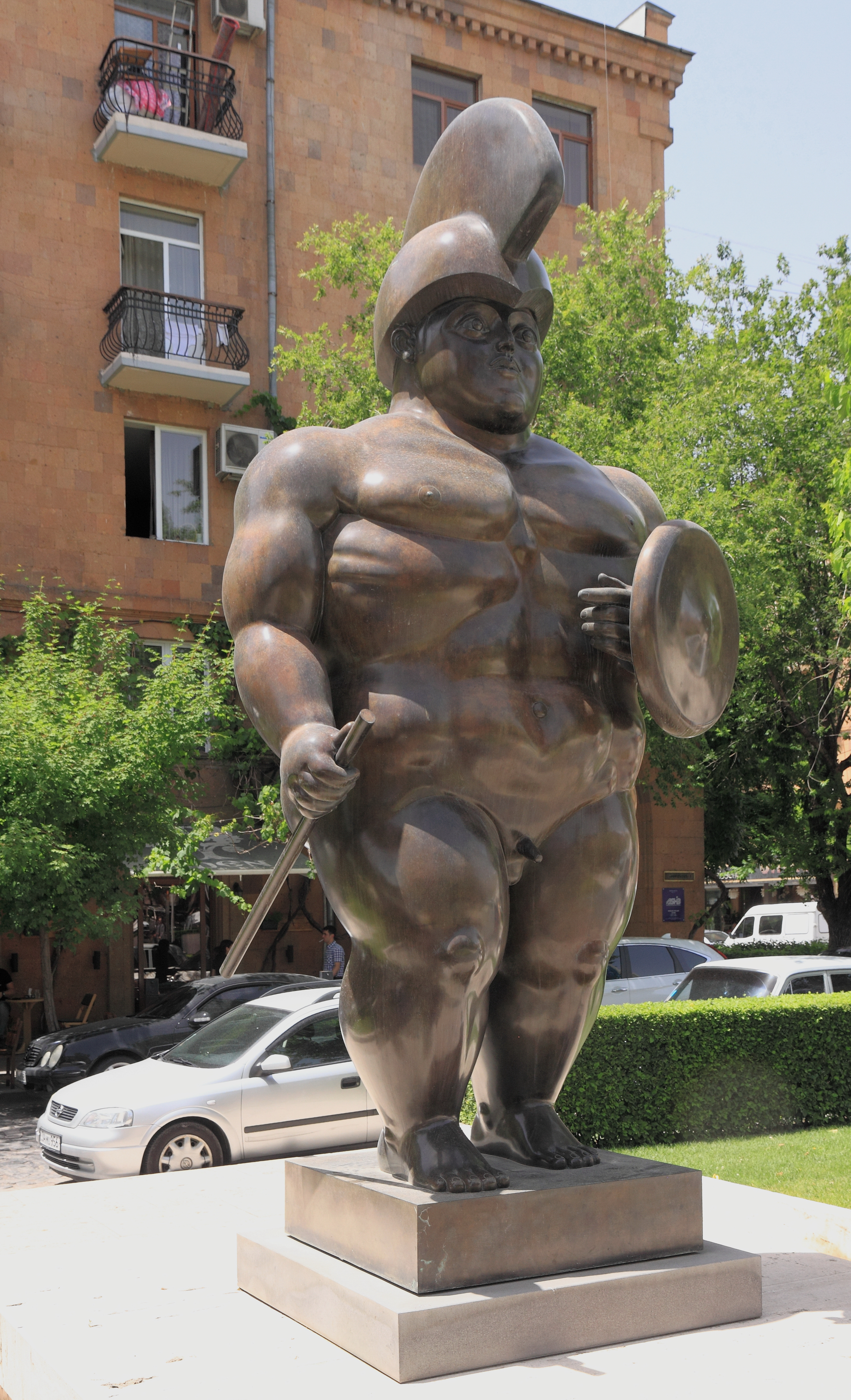
Botero's Roman Warrior Statue

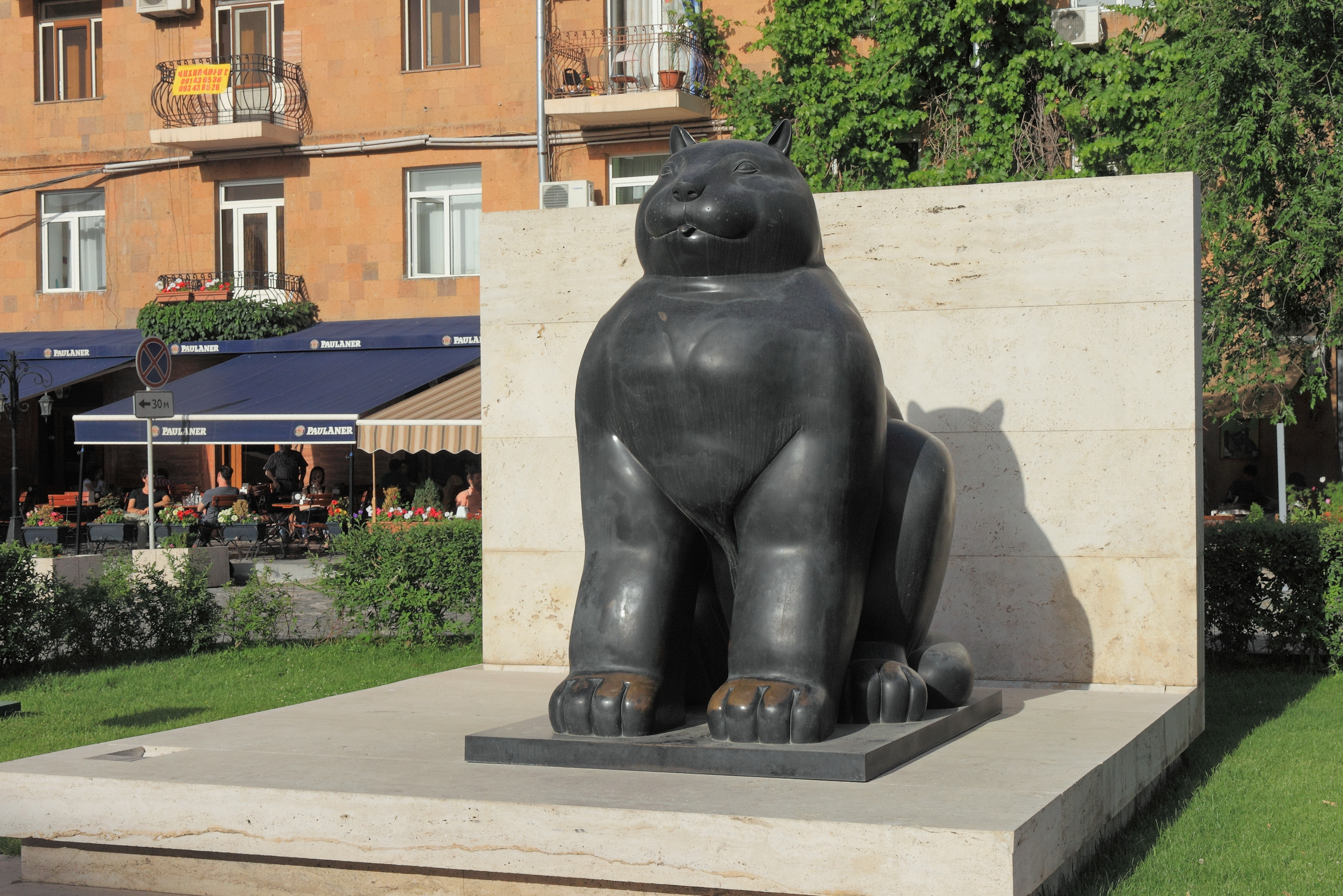
Botero's Cat
