= Cafesjian Museum of Art =

Cafesjian Center for the Arts
- Գաֆէսճեան արվեստի կենտրոն
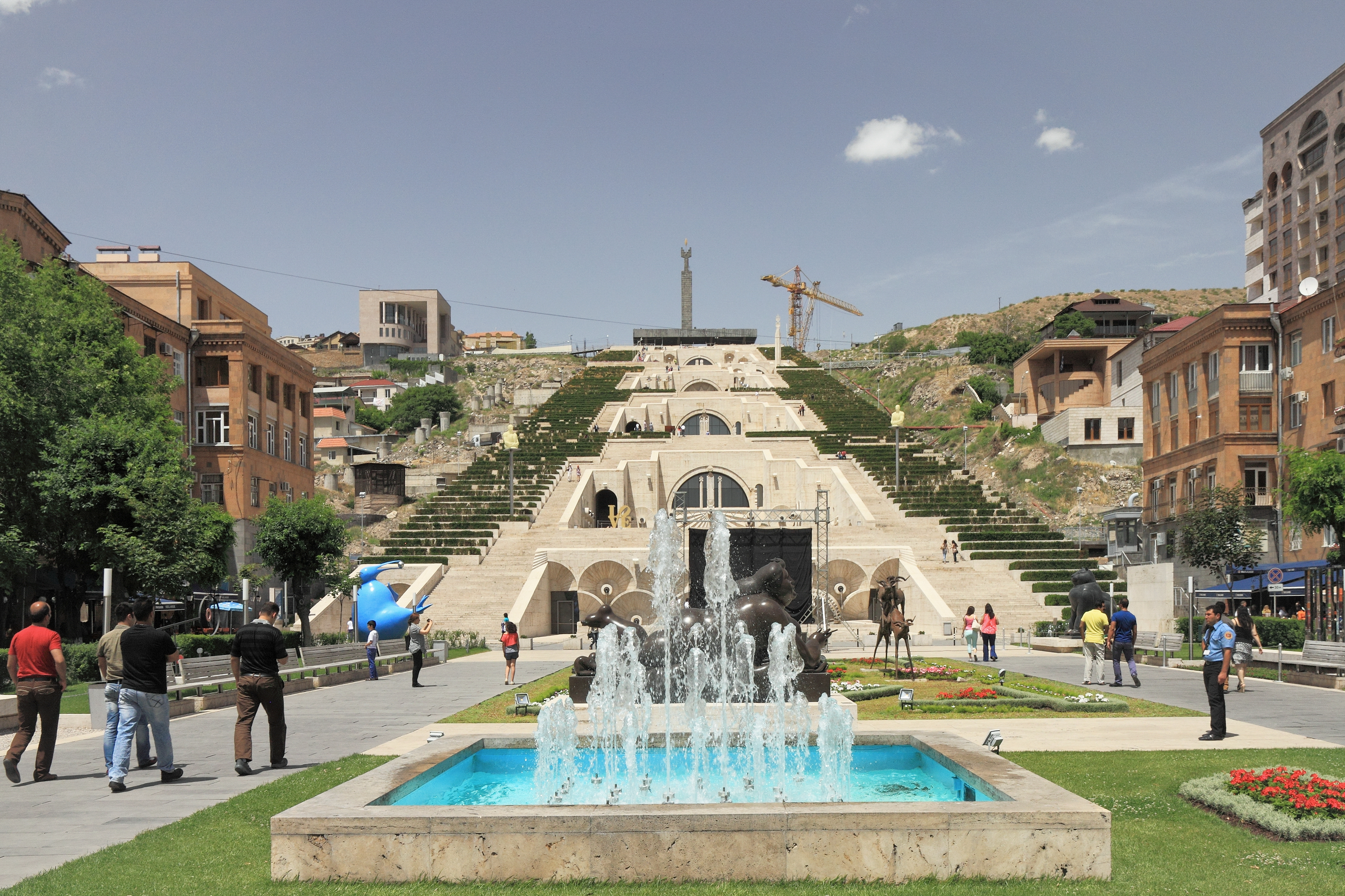
- The Cafesjian Center for the Arts situated in and around the Yerevan Cascade
- Established: 17 November 2009
- Location: Yerevan, Armenia
- Coordinates: 40.1915°N 44.5156°E
- Type: contemporary art museum
- Collection size: more than 5,000
- Visitors: more than 1 million
- Director: Vahagn Marabyan
- Website: cmf.am

The Cafesjian Center for the Arts (CCA, Armenian: Գաֆէսճեան արվեստի կենտրոն (Gafesčyan arvesti kentron), also known as the Cafesjian Museum Foundation) is an art museum in Yerevan, Armenia. It is located at the central Kentron District, in and around the Yerevan Cascade which is a complex of massive staircase with fountains, ascending up from the Tamanyan Street gardens and pedestrian zone.

Founded by Gerard L. Cafesjian, the museum offers exhibitions derived from the Gerard L. Cafesjian collection of contemporary art. Opened in November 2009, besides the exhibition of works of modern art, the museum offers a program of lectures, films, concerts, and educational initiatives for adults and children. Over one million people have visited the Center annually since its opening.

The museum is directed and run and the Cafesjian Museum Foundation.

== History ==
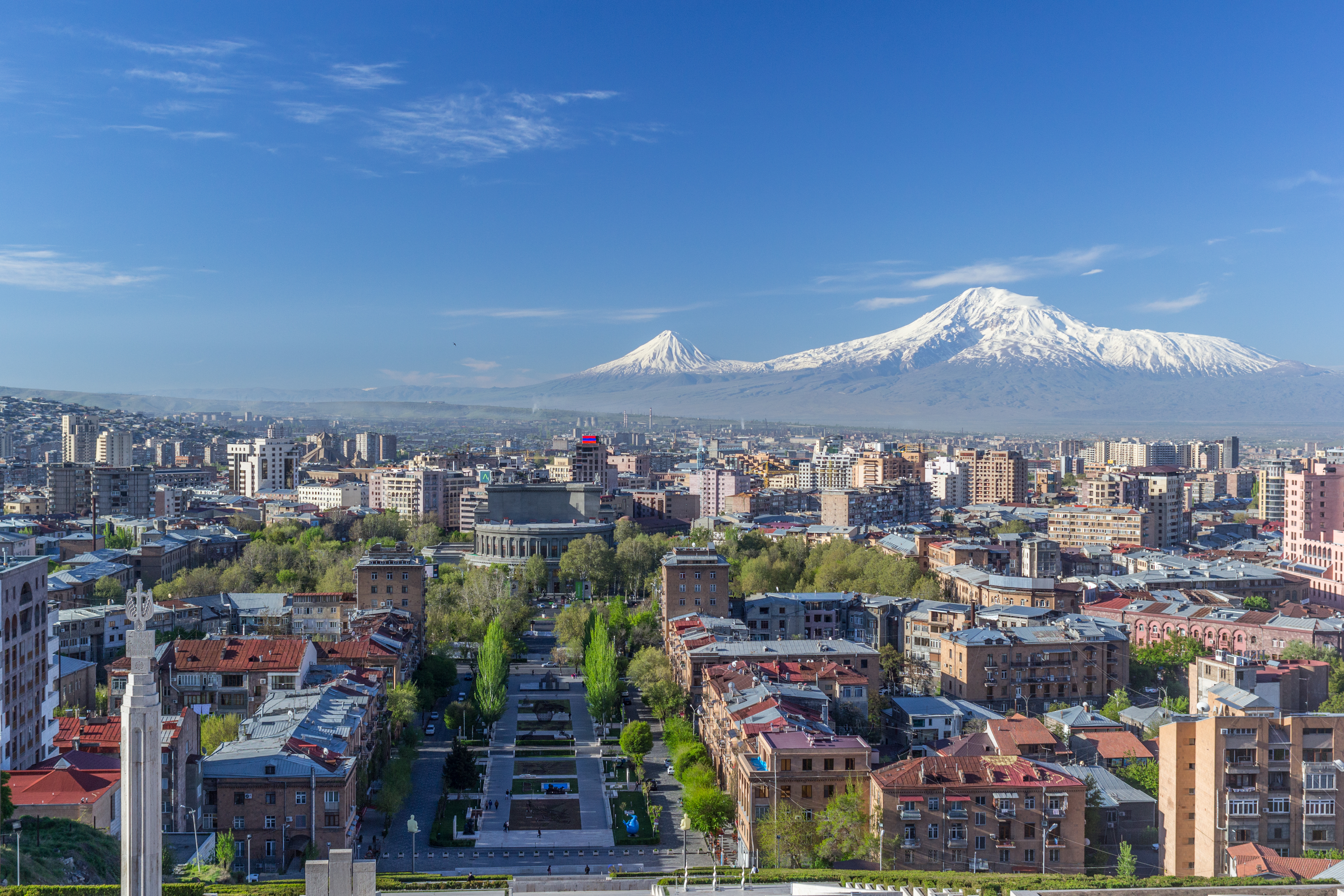
View of the Yerevan skyline and Mount Ararat from the stairs

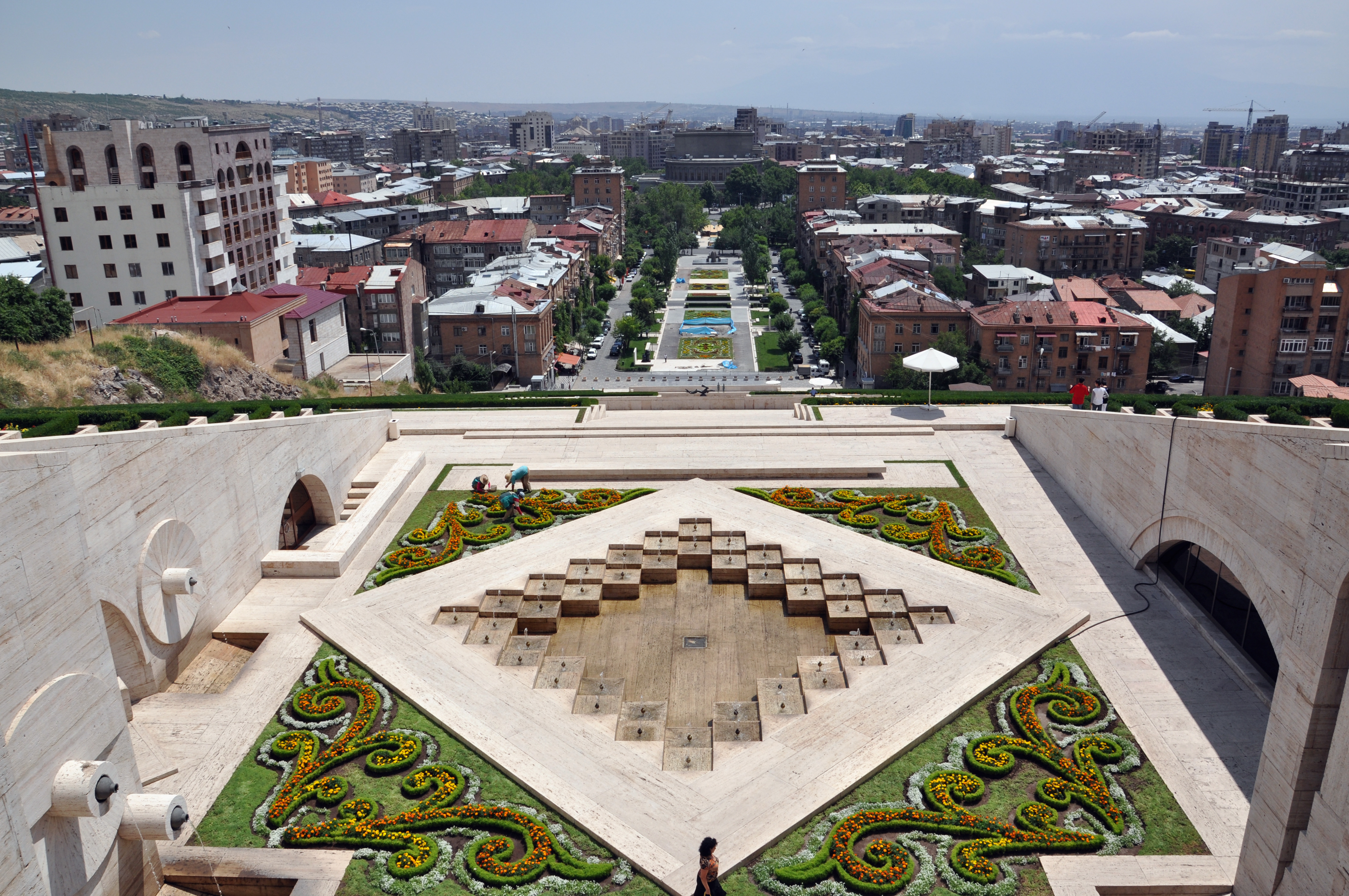
View from a garden terrace of the Cafesjian Museum of Art at the Cascade

The Cafesjian Museum Foundation was established in April 2002 in Yerevan under the auspices of the Government of Armenia and the Cafesjian Museum Foundation of America. The Armenian government provided the foundation with the half-constructed Yerevan Cascade complex along with the surrounding area.

The construction of the Cafesjian Museum was launched in April 2005 and was expected to be completed in April 2008. However, with a slight delay, the grand opening of the museum took place on 17 November 2009. The opening ceremony was attended by the Armenian president Serzh Sargsyan, minister of culture Hasmik Poghosyan, minister of diaspora Hranush Hakobyan, as well as representatives of diplomatic missions in Armenia, various artists and political figures.

The Cafesjian Museum Foundation invested over 35 million dollars to complete the reconstruction of the Cascade.

== Architecture ==
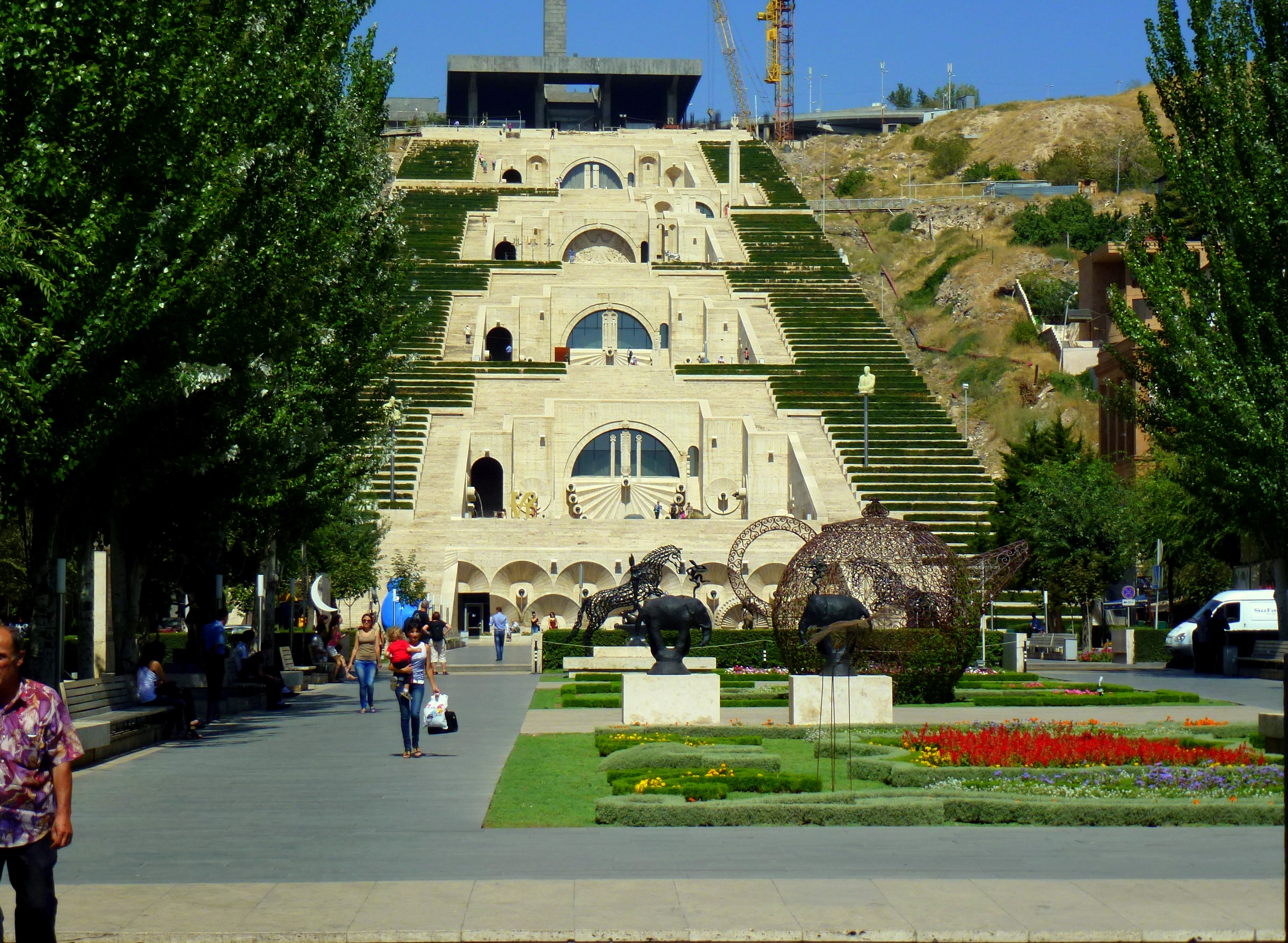
General view of the Cafesjian Centre

The museum is situated within the cascade complex of Yerevan and along the adjacent pedestrian zone and gardens at the entrance to the cascade from the Tamanyan Street. The beginning of the construction of the cascade dates back to 1971, designed by architects Jim Torosyan, Aslan Mkhitaryan, Sargis Gurzadyan. The first phase of the plan was completed in 1980. The cascade is a complex massive staircase on both sides with fountains in between, ascending up from the Tamanyan Street gardens and pedestrian zone. Having five levels, the number of the stairs is 572, ascending along 302 meters upwards.

However, only between 2002 and 2009 the complex was developed and the museum was opened through the Cafesjian Family Foundation.

The art center project was designed by New York-based architect David Hotson.

The museum is considered one of the most ambitious works of contemporary architecture undertaken in any of the former republics of the Soviet Union." The New York Times described it as "a mad work of architectural megalomania and architectural recovery, (...) one of the strangest and most spectacular museum buildings to open in ages."

== Structure ==
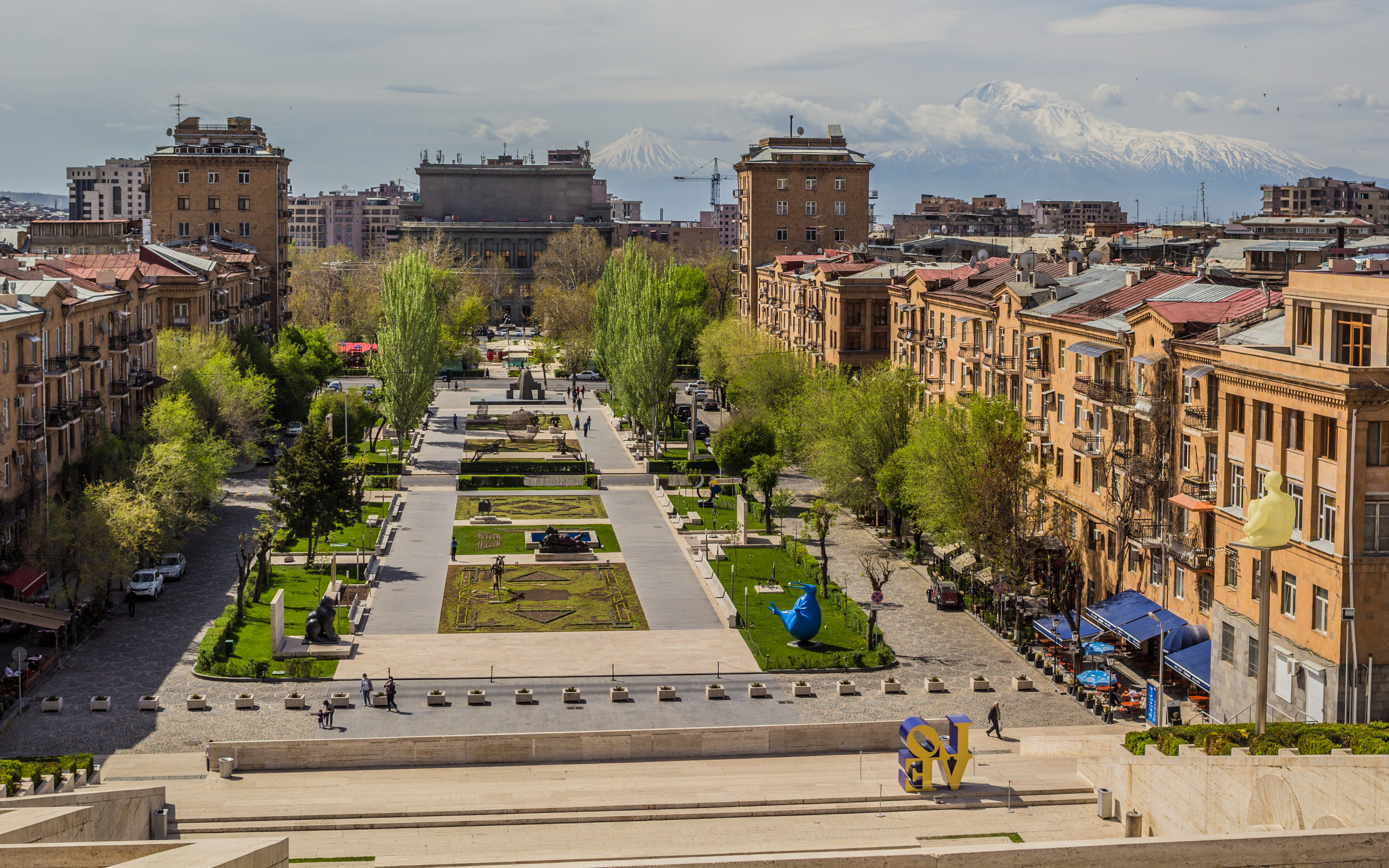
The Cafesjian Sculpture Garden

The museum consists of 2 separate sections: the external "Cafesjian Sculpture Garden", and the internal "Cafesjian Art Galleries".

- The Cafesjian Sculpture Garden is the front gardens of the cascade where many sculptures are exhibited. Sculptures are also exhibited in the garden terrace along the massive steps and fountains ascending up from the Tamanyan street gardens. With unobstructed walkways, long vistas, and formal garden areas, it has been specially designed to provide a modern setting for large-scale sculpture by many internationally recognized figures.
- The "Cafesjian Art Galleries" including the Gallery One, Khanjyan Gallery, Eagle Gallery, Sasuntsi Davit Garden Gallery, Star Landing and the Special Events Auditorium, located underneath the exterior staircase and fountains. The galleries are home to a massive collection of glass artwork exhibited in several galleries and sections, including permanent shows or temporary exhibitions.
- Khanjyan Gallery is home to the large scale mural triptych "History of Armenia" by renowned Soviet and Armenian painter Grigor Khanjyan. Sasuntsi Davit Gallery includes basrelief by Artashes Hovsepyan depicting scenes from the Armenian epic fable David of Sasun.

== Collection ==
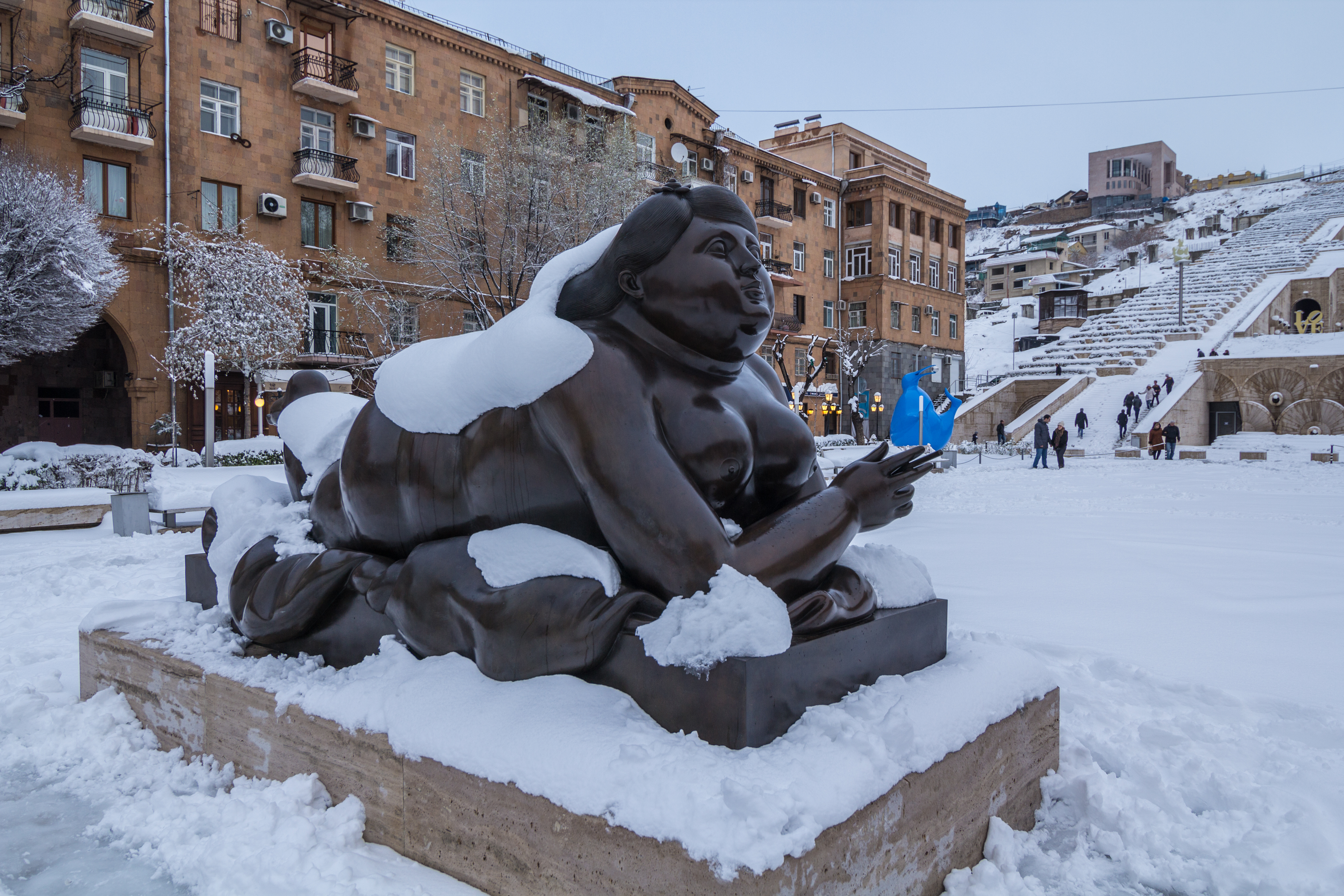
Fernando Botero, Mujer Fumando un Cigarrillo (Woman Smoking a Cigarette), 1987 bronze, dark brown patina

The majority of the museum's collection are derived from the private collection of the founder Gerard L. Cafesjian. With more than 5,000 works, the centre exhibits one of the most comprehensive glass collections in the world, particularly the works of the Czech couple Stanislav Libenský and Jaroslava Brychtová, whose collaborative work revolutionized the use of glass as an artistic medium. Other important glass artists in the collection include Dale Chihuly, Bohumil Elias, Pavel Hlava, Jaromír Rybák, Ivana Šrámková, Bertil Vallien, Lino Tagliapietra, Mark Peiser, and Hiroshi Yamano.

The collection also has substantial holdings in drawing, painting and sculpture by many influential artists including Fernando Botero, Arshile Gorky, Jennifer Bartlett, Lynn Chadwick, Barry Flanagan, Jaume Plensa, and François-Xavier Lalanne.

=== Works ===
Sculptor	Work
Lynn Chadwick	Sitting Figures, Stairs, Two watchers
Barry Flanagan	Hare on Bell, Acrobats, Big Boxing Hare on Anvil, Gendrd I, Gendrd II
Fernando Botero	Cat, Roman warrior, Woman Smoking a Cigarette

== Programs and events ==
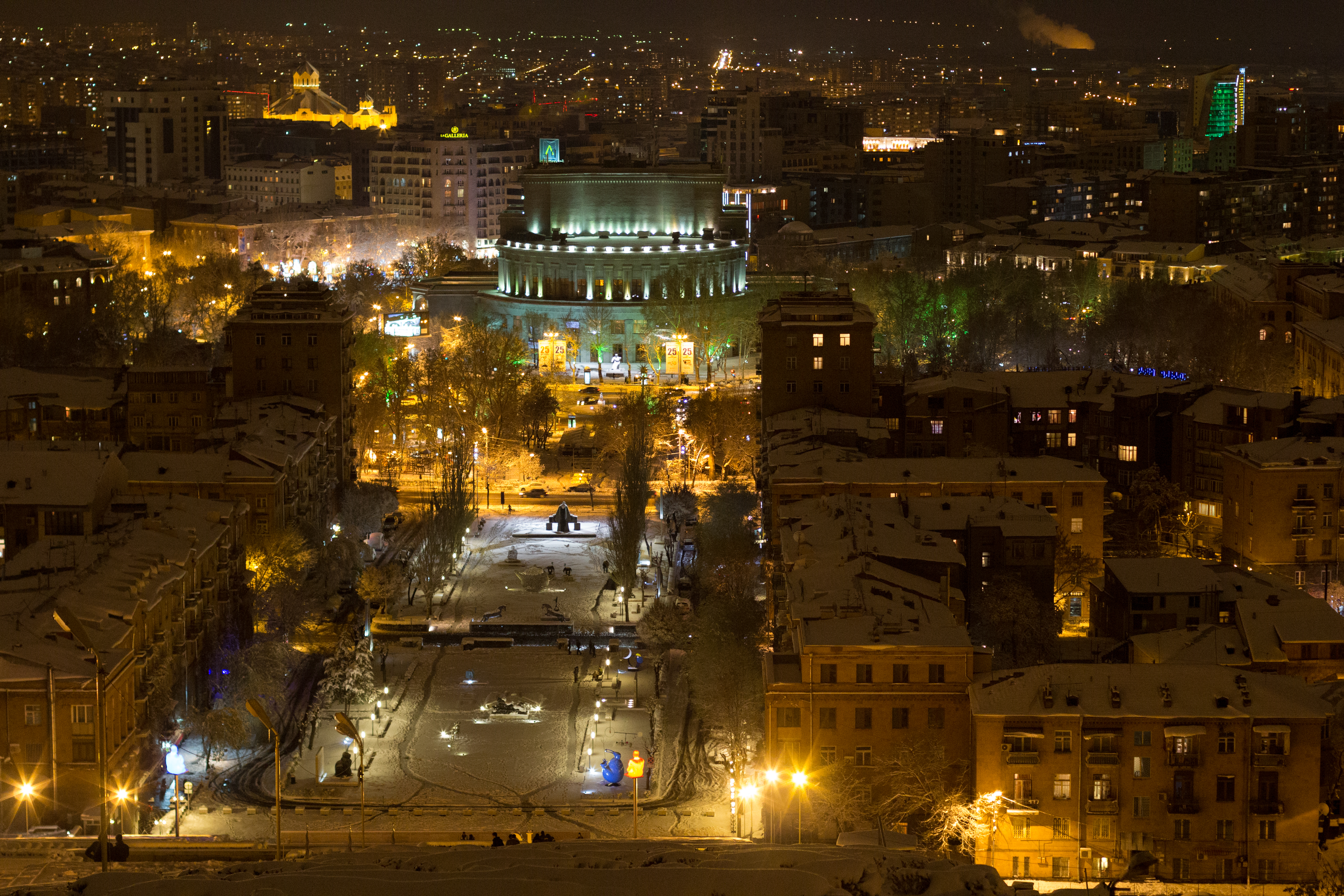
Nighttime view of Yerevan from atop the Cafesjian Museum of Art at the Cascade

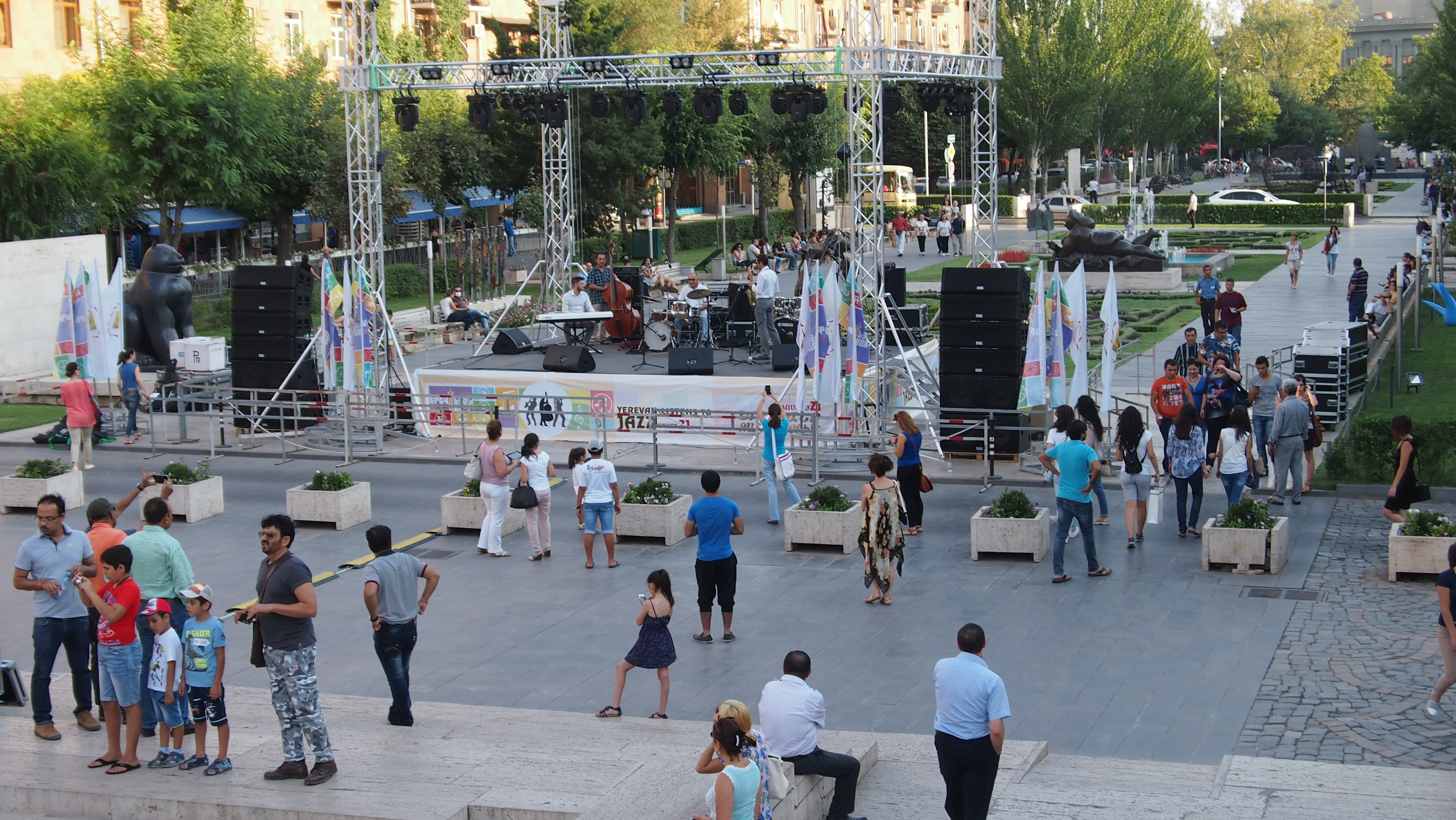
Preparing for a concert at the Cafesjian sculpture garden

The museum organizes regular programmed events throughout the year:

- Encounters with Art: is a program launched in October 2010 as a series of events for adults, focusing on arts and artists. It takes place on the first Thursday of each month.
- Cafesjian Classical Music Series: under the slogan "to bring the best of the world art to Armenia and present the best of Armenian culture to the world", the Cafesjian Center for the Arts regularly organizes concerts for classical music lovers. It takes place at the first Wednesday of each month at the Special Events Auditorium. The program was launched in July 2010.
- Traditional Folk Dances at the Cafesjian Center for the Arts: it is regularly performed by the "Karin Dance Ensemble" on the last Friday of each month between May and September. It is an open show of traditional Armenian folk dance where hundreds of people join, irrespective of the weather at the Cafesjian Sculpture Garden. The program was launched in May 2010.
- Music Cascade: the series are among Yerevan's most popular pastimes. Many local renowned bands such as the Armenian Jazz Band, Cadence Ensemble, Katuner, Chico and Friends, Dorians, Suren Arustamyan and Arsa are among the regular performers. Live concerts of jazz, pop and rock music are performed at the Special Events Auditorium every Friday and Saturday, since March 2010.

On July 5, 2010, U.S. Secretary of State Hillary Clinton delivered a speech at the Cafesjian Museum using the 'Rebirth of Armenia' section of Khanjyan's triptych as a background.

On August 20, 2010, The Khanjyan gallery of the Cafesjian Center for the Arts hosted the informal meeting of the Collective Security Treaty Organization (CSTO) member states. The meeting was attended by the president of Armenia, Serzh Sargsyan; the president of the Russian Federation, Dmitriy Medvedev; the president of Kazakhstan, Nursultan Nazarbayev; the president of Tajikistan, Emomali Rakhmon; the interim leader of Kyrgyzstan, Rosa Otunbayeva, as well as the secretary general of the Collective Security Treaty Organization, Nikolay Bordyuzha.

== Gallery ==
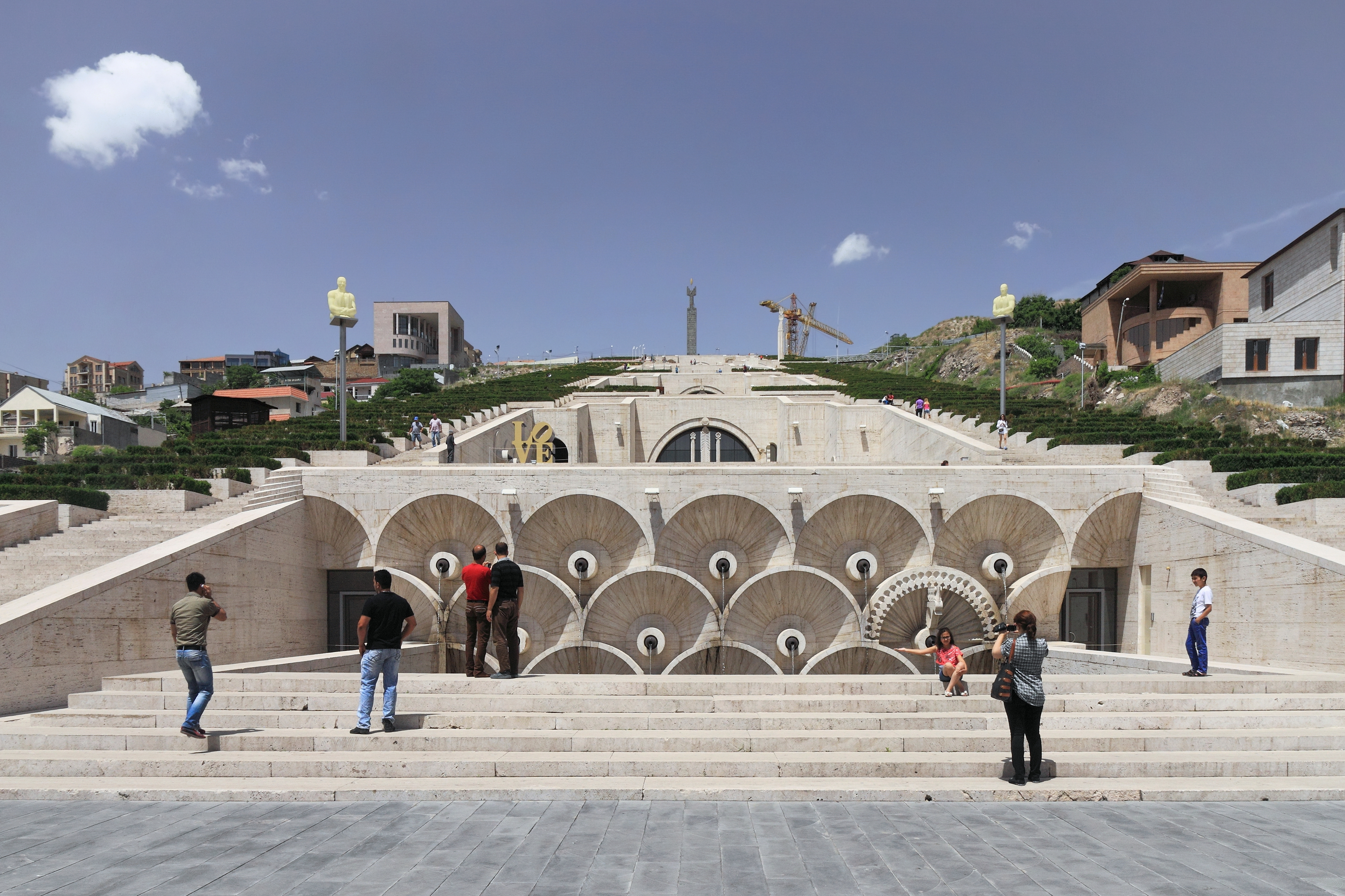
First level

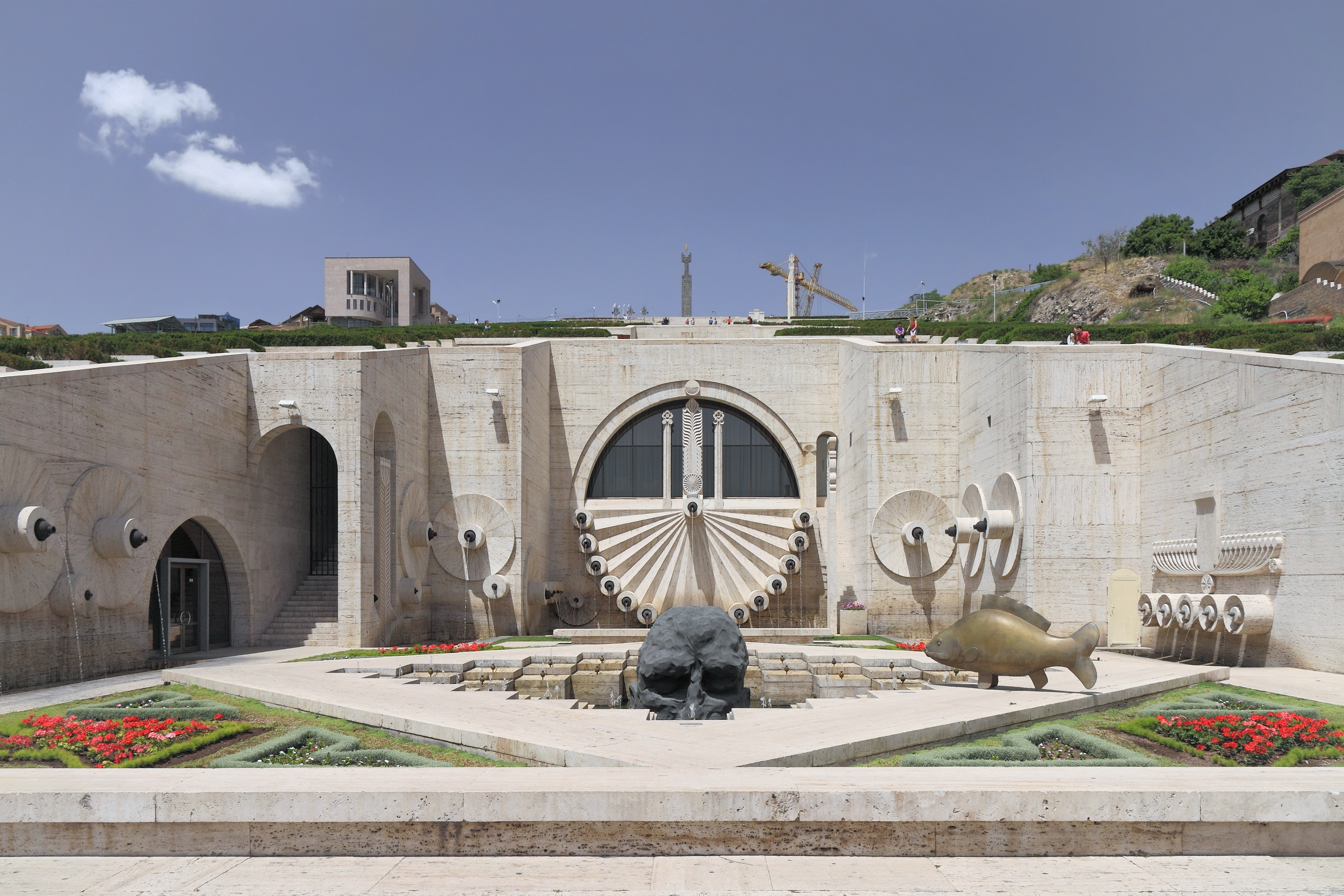
Second level

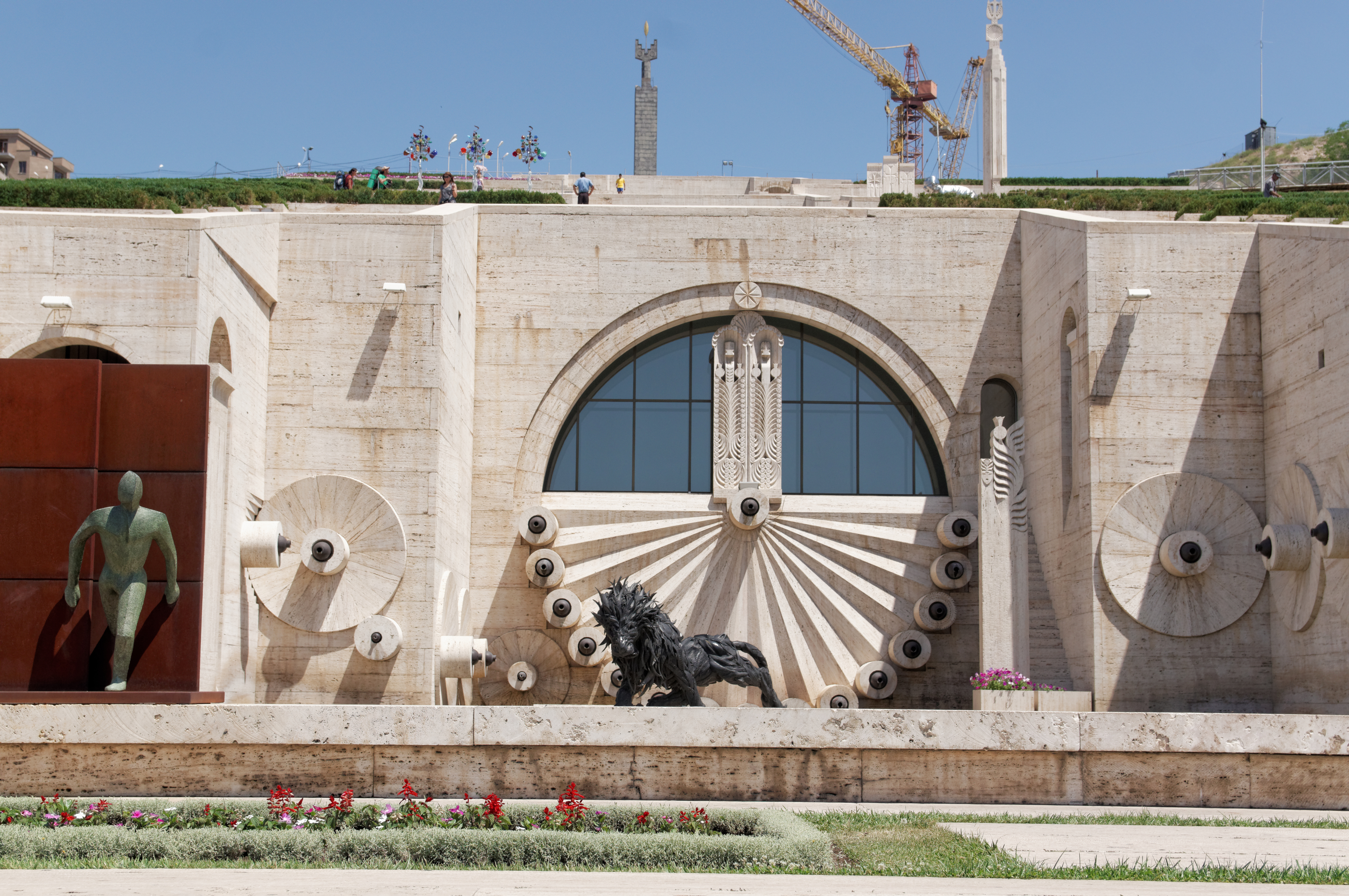
Third level

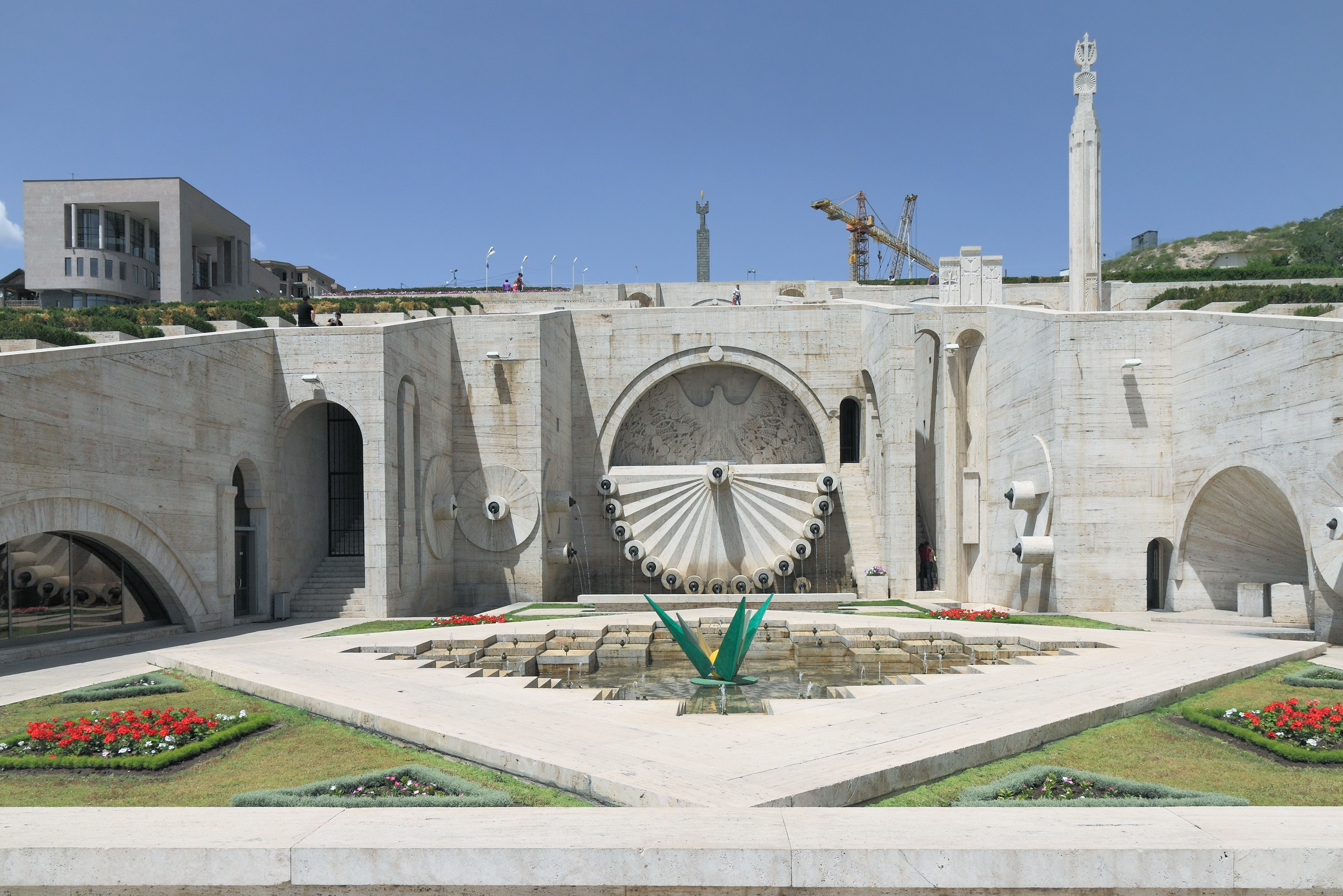
Fourth level

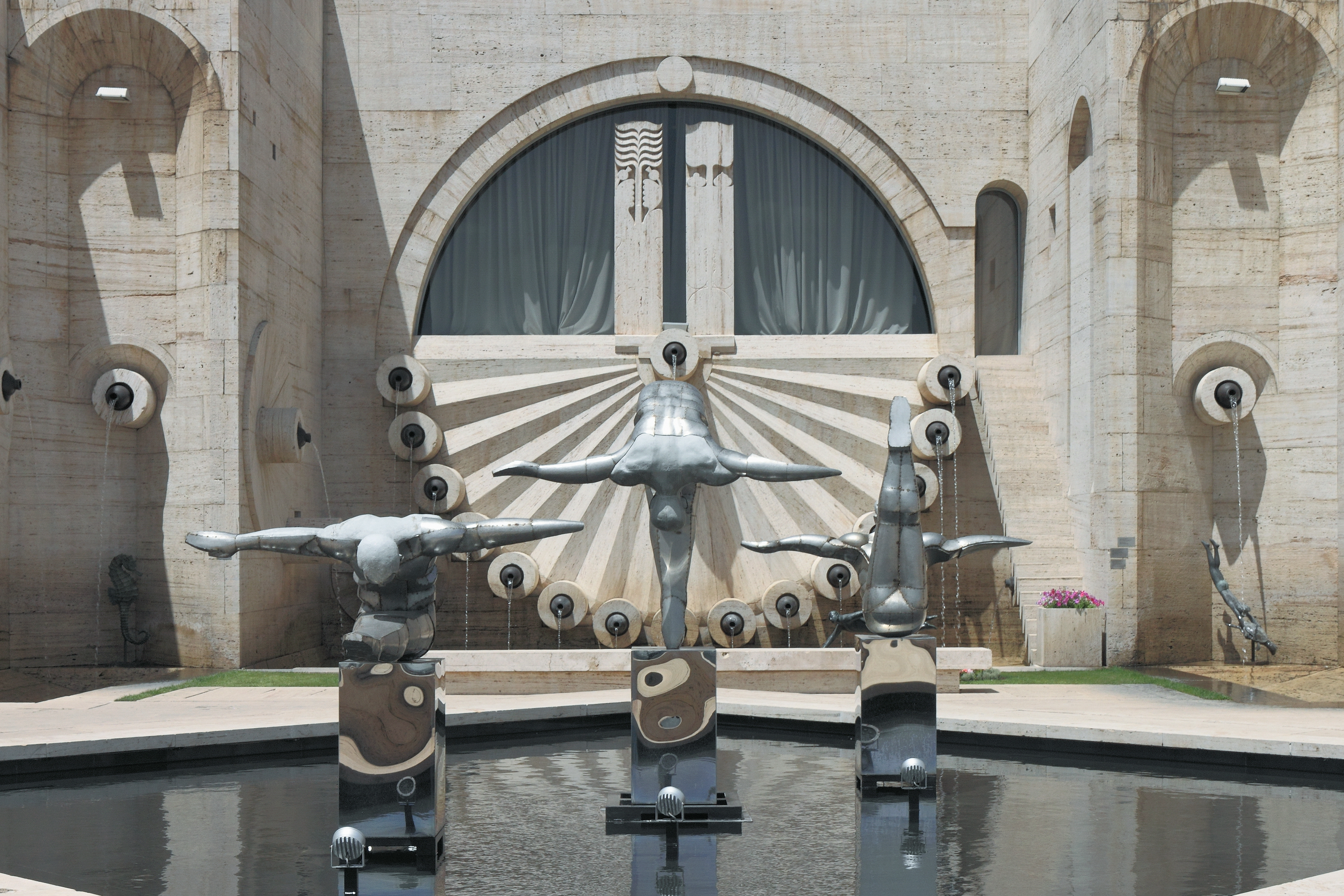
Fifth level

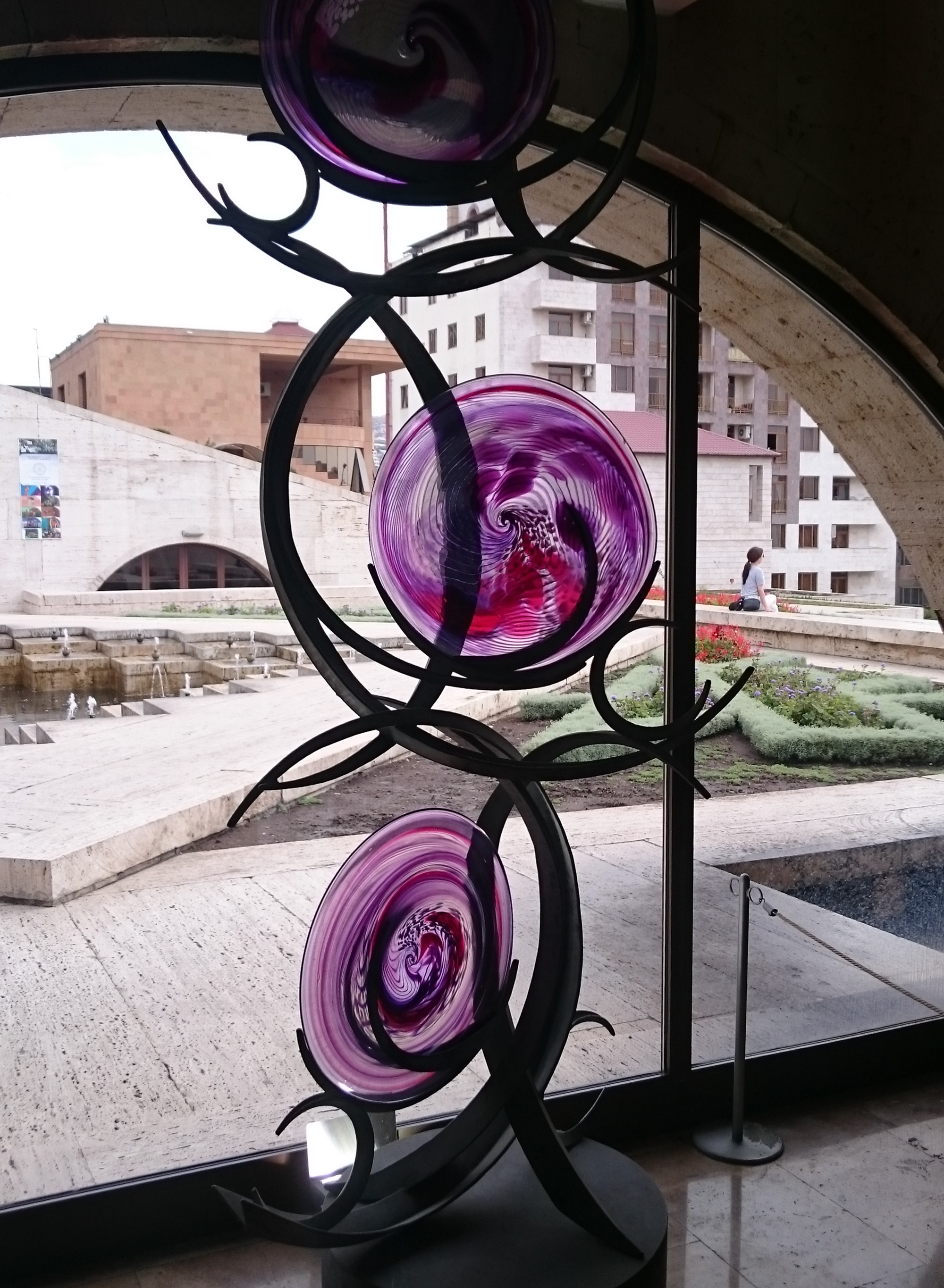
Art alongside Cascade

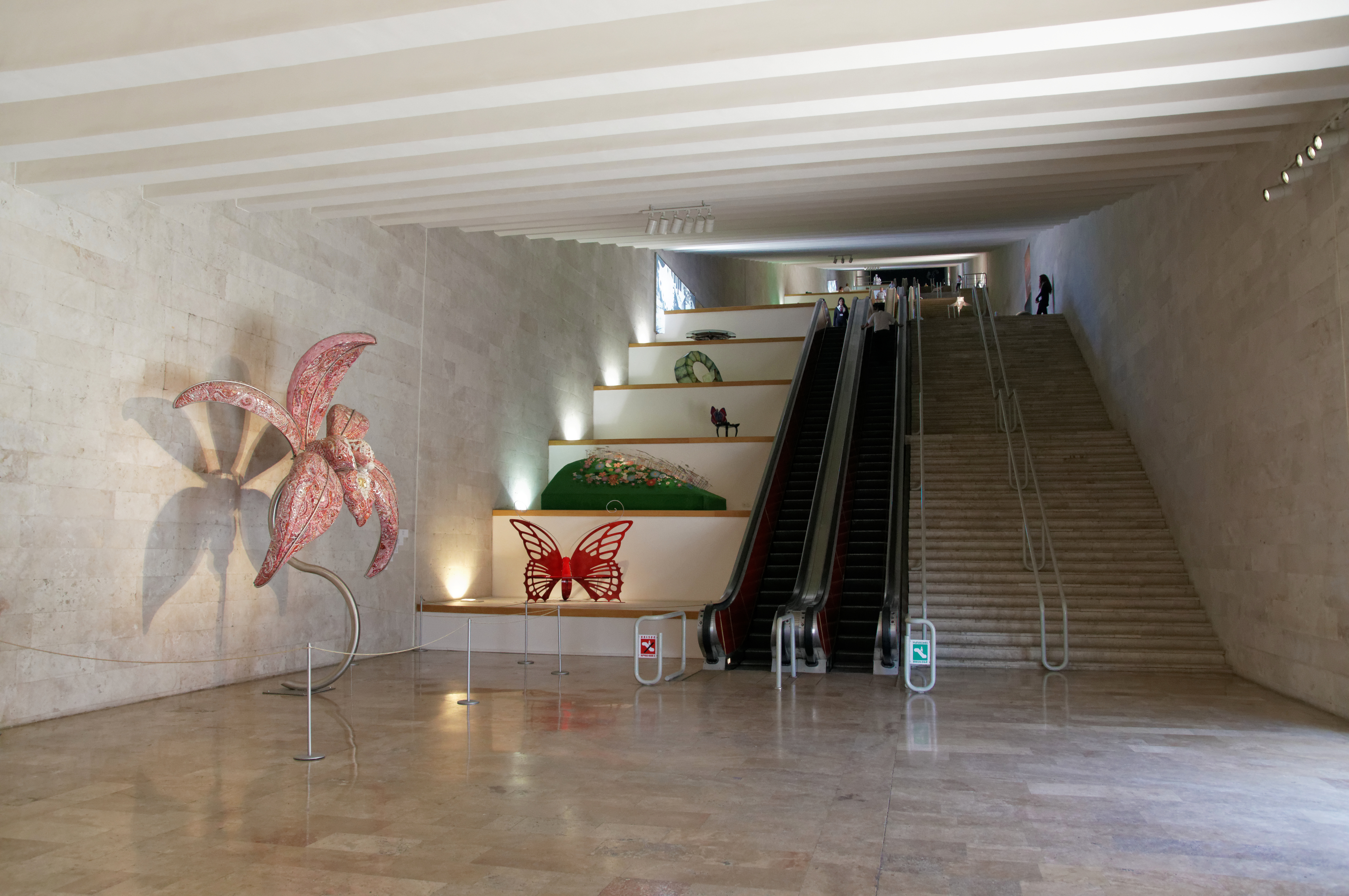
Art in Cafesjian Museum of Art

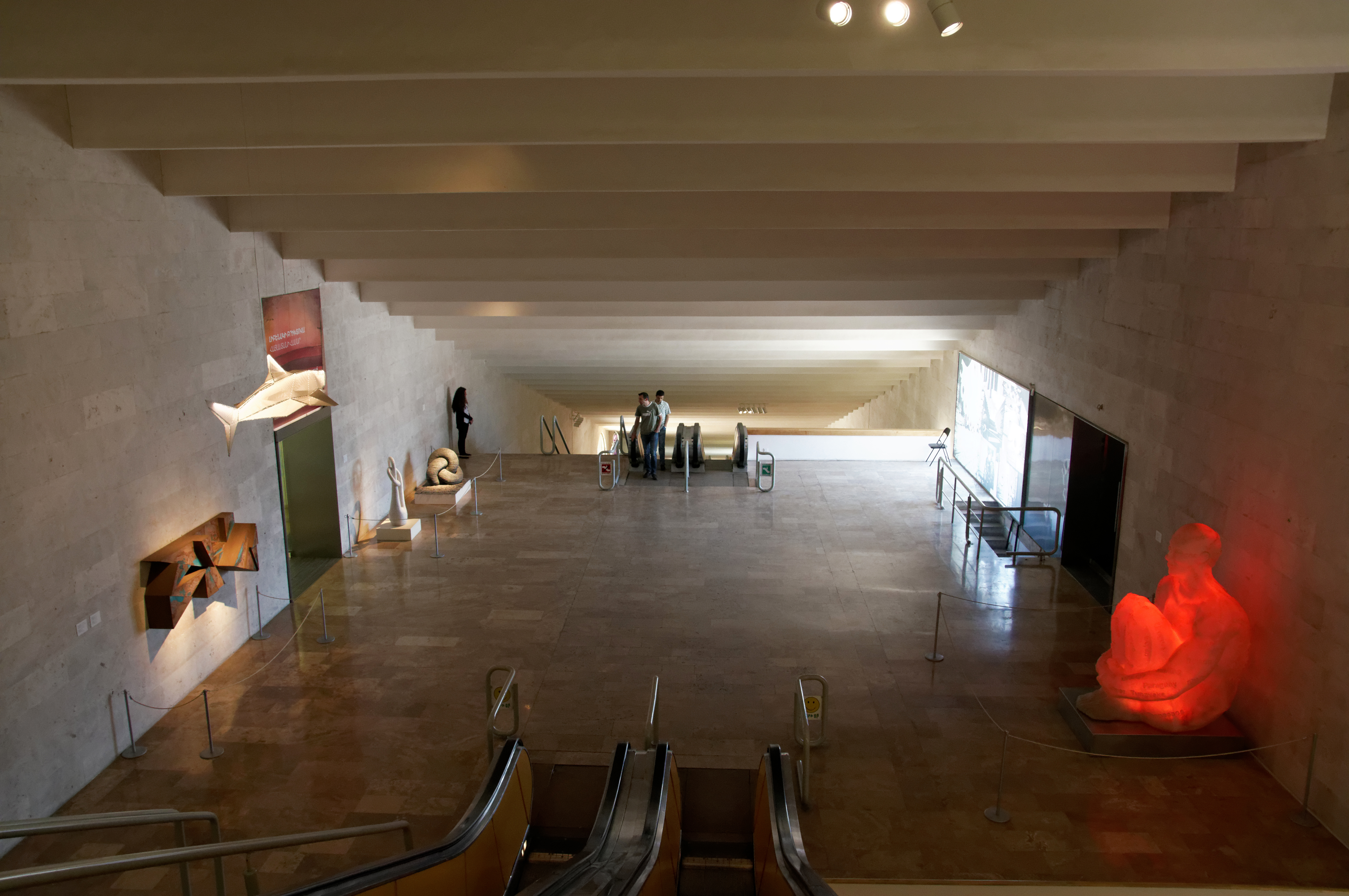
Cafesjian Museum of Art

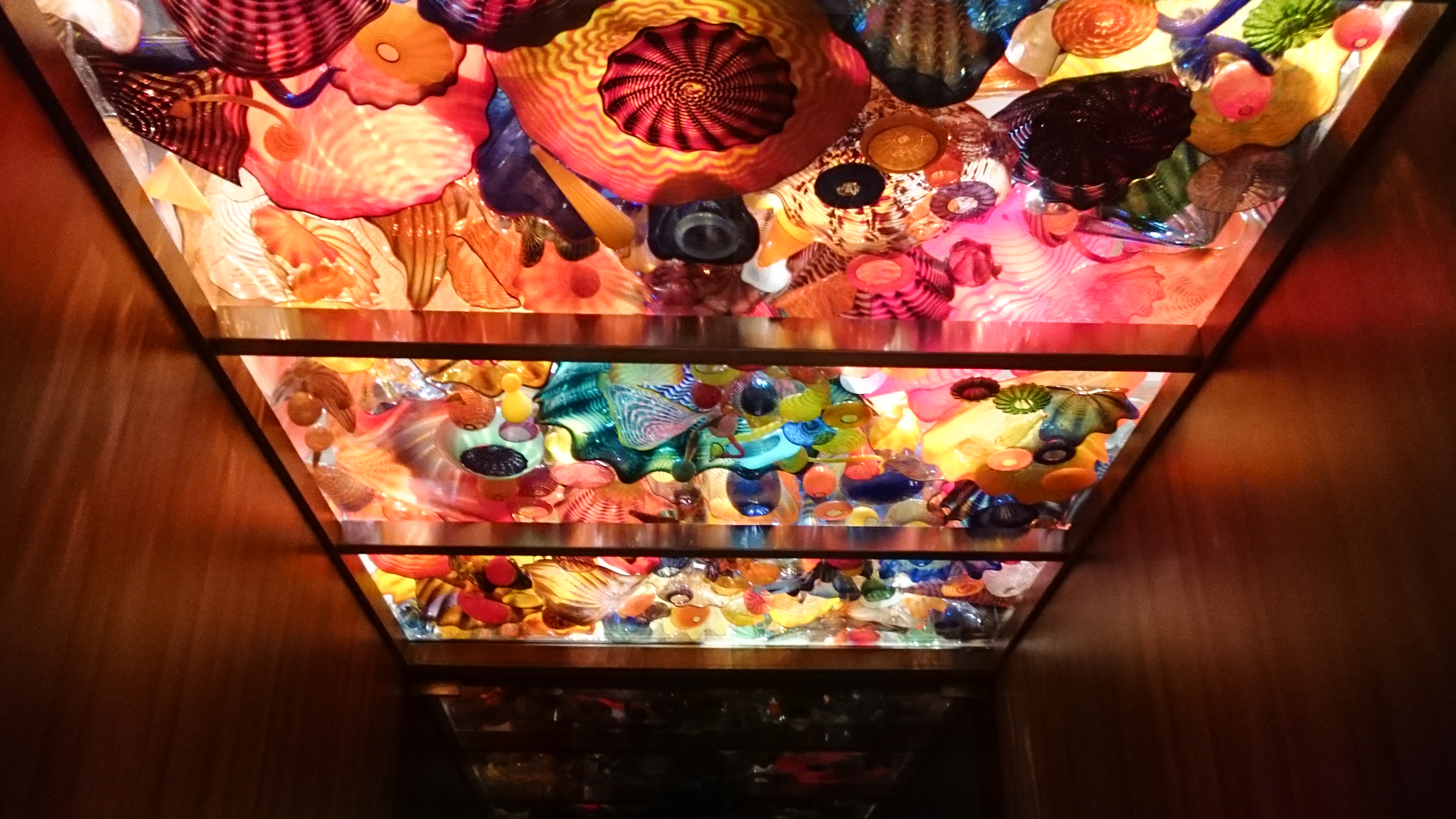
Colored glass roof at the top of the Cascade
